= LittleBits Synth Kit =

Analogue modular synthesiser

littleBits Synth Kit
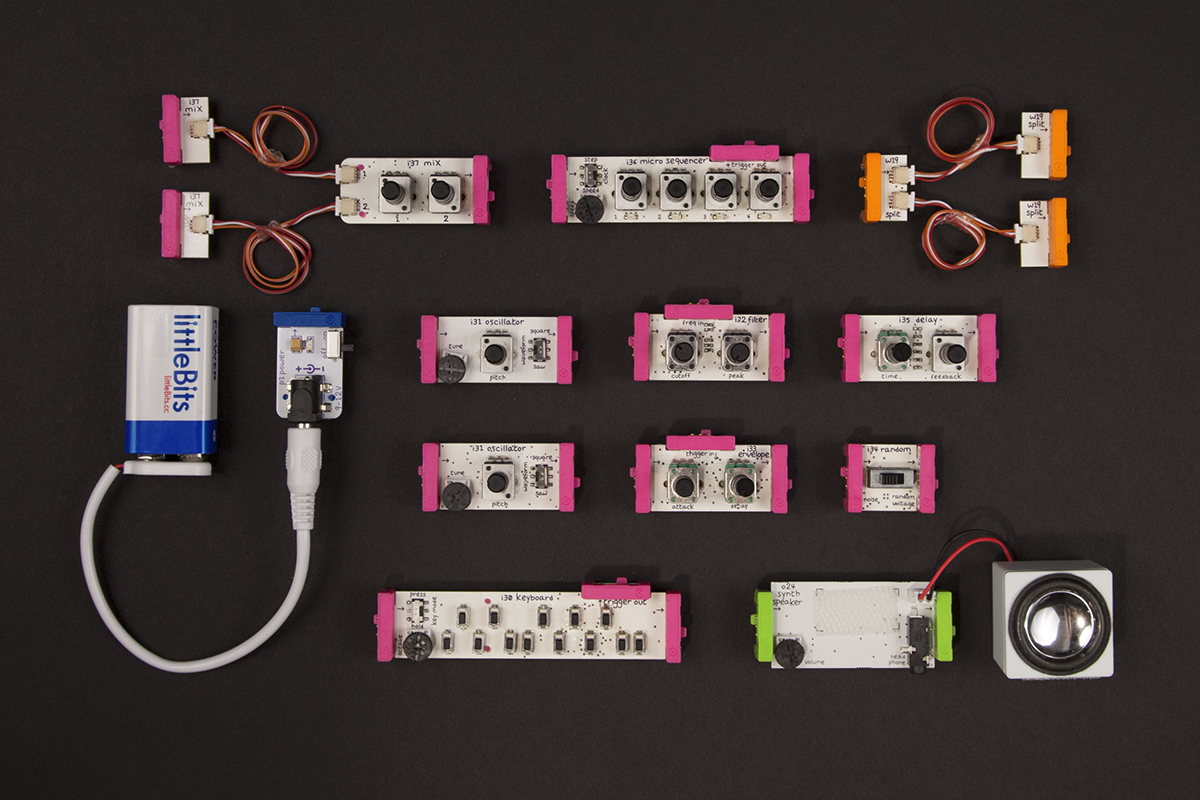
- A disassembled view of the Synth Kit
- Manufacturer: littleBits and Korg
- Price: $159

Technical specifications
- Polyphony: monophonic
- Timbrality: monotimbral
- Oscillator: Two VCOs
- Synthesis type: analogue subtractive
- Filter: VCF
- Attenuator: AD envelope generator
- Effects: Delay

Input/output
- Keyboard: 13 keys (one octave chromatic)
- External control: MIDI, CV and USB (via expansion bits)

The littleBits Synth Kit is an analogue modular synthesiser developed by the American electronics startup littleBits in collaboration with the Japanese music technology company Korg. Released in late 2013 after a design process of around nine months, the kit features 12 small modules (called "bits") that can be connected to form larger circuits. Several of these bits are adapted from circuits used in Korg's Monotron synthesisers. A booklet detailing over 10 example projects to follow is sold with the kit. A later version of the Synth Kit, the Synth Pro Kit, was released in June 2015 and added three new bits that provide external connectivity for the kit.

The Synth Kit received praise from reviewers, who commented on its affordability and possible use as a tool for education. Following its release, schematic files of the bits included in the Synth Kit were uploaded to a GitHub repository under the CERN Open Hardware License. Several musicians and composers have used the Synth Kit in their music, including the American electronic musician Nullsleep.

== Production and release ==
The Synth Kit was produced in a collaboration between the Japanese music technology company Korg, the American electronics startup littleBits and the comedian Reggie Watts. (Note: The Synth Kit was littleBits' third collaboration with another company.) The collaboration began in early 2012, when littleBits' founder Ayah Bdeir and Watts met at a TED conference. They discussed the prospect of using the littleBits technology to create a musical instrument. During the Synth Kit's production, Watts acted as an advisor for the project.

In December 2012, Korg contacted littleBits asking whether they were interested in creating an instrument together. The two companies decided to arrange a meeting to discuss the idea. When representatives of the companies met in January 2013, they had the idea to make a modular synthesiser out of littleBits modules (known as "bits"). Ideas for the kit were modeled in Max and then made into schematics by Korg. littleBits then used the schematics to create prototype PCBs for the kit. The entire design process took nine months.

The Synth Kit was released in late 2013, priced at $159. Prior to the kit's release, a news embargo was put in place until its announcement on 10 November 2013. The embargo was accidentally broken by journalists at MusicTech magazine before the planned release date. Shipping of the kit began in early December.

=== Later releases ===
On 31 March 2015, littleBits and Korg released three new bits which provide MIDI (using minijack or USB), USB (for either control voltage (CV) or audio) and CV (using either volt per octave or Hz per volt) input/output. These modules allow the Synth Kit to interface with external devices, such as MIDI keyboards, computers and other modular synthesisers. These bits were sold separately from the standard Synth Kit, and cost $35 (USB and CV bits) or $40 (MIDI bit) individually. Alternatively, they were available through the Synth Pro Kit, which was released in June 2015 for $140. The expansion included the three new bits as well as additional connectivity cables and mounting boards.

In April 2015, Korg asked the public to participate in a vote on their bitLab website, which they used to incubate new additions to the Synth Kit. The vote was concerning an LFO bit, which was slated to have control over frequency and waveshape (pulse wave with duty cycle control or a morphing triangle to saw wave). According to Tatsuya Takahashi, Korg's former chief engineer, "the LFO or Low Frequency Oscillator module was designed alongside the littleBits Synth Kit but didn't make it into the final kit configuration".

== Design ==
The Synth Kit is an example of a modular synthesiser: a synthesiser composed of modules that needs to be patched (connected) together to make sounds.

=== Bits ===
The Synth Kit is made up of 12 small modules called "bits", which join together with magnets to form larger circuits. (Note: The magnets are polarised in a way that prevents bits being connected upside down.) According to MusicTech, these 12 bits allow more than 500,000 circuit combinations. Unlike other electronics kits, the Synth Kit (like other littleBits sets) does not require any soldering of components as all bits come pre-assembled. There are four types of bits, each represented by a different neon colour:

1. Power bits are coloured blue; they allow functions such as battery power and USB connectivity.
2. Input bits are pink and make up the main synthesiser. They include bits such as a voltage-controlled oscillator (VCO), a keyboard and a light sensor.
3. Wire bits are coloured orange and are used to connect other bits.
4. Output bits are green and allow physical outputs from the electronics, such as a speaker.

Bits in the Synth Kit are able to be used alongside other littleBits products. Included in the Synth Kit is one power bit, nine input bits, a wire bit and an output bit:

Bits included in the Synth Kit
Name	Bit type	Notes	Ref(s)
p1 power	power	Can be connected to a 9V PP3 battery or a 9V DC power supply.	
i30 keyboard	input	Covers one octave chromatically (C to C) with a control to switch between each in the full four octave range. The keyboard has 13 micro-switches for keys.	
i31 oscillator	input	A VCO with control over waveform (between saw or square), pitch and fine tune. Two oscillator bits are included in the kit.	
i32 filter	input	A voltage-controlled filter with control over cutoff and resonance. The filter is capable of self-oscillating.	
i33 envelope	input	An attack-decay (AD) envelope generator with input for triggers.	
i34 random	input	A module that can either be used as a white noise generator or a sample and hold circuit. In the latter use, sampling can be triggered from other bits.	
i35 delay	input	A delay effect with time and feedback control. It is capable of self-oscillating when the feedback amount is high.	
i36 micro-sequencer	input	A four step sequencer that has control over its internal clock. The internal clock can also be overridden by an external clock input.	
i37 mixer	input	Allows two signals to be mixed into a single output.	
w19 split	wire	Allows a single signal to be sent to two inputs.	
o24 synth speaker	output	A one inch speaker with an additional mono minijack output.	

In versions of the kit released in the United States, an extra module called the "a8 bitboard" was included. This was used to mount other bits on a common surface to create more robust circuits. The a8 bitboard was not included in version of the Synth Kit released in the United Kingdom.

Some bits are similar to circuits used in Korg's Monotron series, but altered to fit the different voltage requirements of the Synth Kit. (Note: The littleBits Synth Kit uses a unipolar voltage range of 0–5V.) For example, the delay bit uses the same chip as the Monotron Delay, and both the Monotron series and the filter bit have VCF circuits based on that of Korg's MS-20 synthesiser.

=== Booklet ===
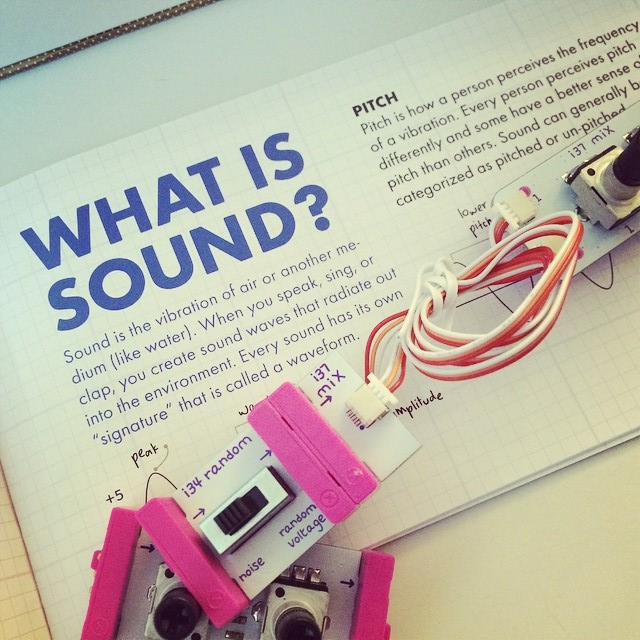
The booklet included with the Synth Kit explains the history of synthesiser and how they make sounds, as well as detailing projects to make with the kit.

As well as including the synthesiser bits, the Synth Kit includes a 35-page long booklet which details the history of synthesisers and how they make sounds. The booklet describes the functions of all the bits with example circuits. It also contains instructions on how to make more than 10 electronics projects, including a keytar and a turntable. These projects make use of other materials, such as paper and cardboard, to create a physical interface for the circuits.

== Reception ==
The Synth Kit was widely praised by reviewers and critics. In his 2014 review for MusicTech magazine, Andy Jones gave the Synth Kit a score of 8/10, as well as the magazine's "innovation award". He commented on the kit's "surprisingly big sound from a small setup" and called it "real innovation, and much more fun". Gordon Reid of Sound on Sound suggested that the kit was a "re-imagining of the analogue monosynth" that, while "far from perfect", could "appeal to all age groups". In particular, he highlighted the kit's potential as a tool for teaching beginners about the basics of synthesisers and sound design. Bruce Aisher of MusicRadar agreed, saying that the kit was more suited to education than being used as "a cheap way into modular synthesis". He found that to make full use of the kit it was necessary to purchase other modules not included, such as the i21 microphone bit for use as an audio input. Gino Robair of Electronic Musician also found that other bits were needed; he "highly recommend[ed]" purchasing mounting boards for the kit to add stability to constructions. The Synth Kit was also one of the 31 products that were awarded an "Editor's Choice Award" as part of the 2015 Electronic Musician Editors' Choice Awards.

The Synth Kit was frequently compared to Lego due to the similarities between building circuits and connecting bricks. Rebecca Greenfield of Fast Company commented that "like mechanical Legos, they click into one another to build something. But, instead of castles and houses, we’re making instruments". According to the musician John Richards, this modular design was similar to Denshi Burokko EX series in concept.

At the request of Watts, littleBits sent a Synth Kit to the British experimental musician Brian Eno, who gave the company feedback on the kit's design. Eno enjoyed using the kit and stated that it would "be the birth of a new kind of music".

== Legacy ==
=== Open source ===
An example scematic from the littleBits GitHub repository. This schematic represents the oscillator bit.

Following littleBits' open source ideology, both EAGLE files and schematic diagrams (as PDF) for all of the Synth Kit bits were uploaded to a GitHub repository. The files uploaded to GitHub were licensed under the version 1.2 of the CERN Open Hardware License.

=== Use in music and art ===
The littleBits Synth Kit has been used by artists including Nullsleep, Justin Lincoln and Watts. Nullsleep used two and a half Synth Kits sequenced using a Sequintix Cirklon digital sequencer during his performance for the Synth Kit's release. Lincoln used the Synth Kit as background audio to his piece The Stroboscope (for Paul Sharits), which was exhibited at the 2015 International Symposium on Electronic Art in Vancouver. Watts was one of the musicians who performed on the Synth Kit at the product's launch, as well as Takahashi and Tadahiko Sakamaki from Korg.

In June 2014, some Synth Kit bits were used at the Chelsea-based Dark Circuits festival, which describes itself as an event for "contemporary electronic music practices such as circuit bending, no-input mixers, laptops, turntablism, analogue circuitry, network sniffers, live coding and soldering, plus other instruments we may have never heard of yet".

The composer Patricia Alessandrini and Weidong Yang used the Synth Kit as part of their installation, A little bit of noise. The project combined a tree bark and moss cradle with the Synth Kit and suspended the result in the air. Viewers of the installation could interact with it by spinning and swinging the cradle, which kept changing the sounds it produced. This was produced as part of the 2019 Scientific Delirium Madness residency held at the Djerassi Artists Residency.

== Notes, references and sources ==
=== Sources ===
- Alessandrini, Patricia (April 2020). "A little bit of noise". Leonardo. 53 (3). doi:10.1162/leon_a_01918. S2CID 215403956.
- Armstrong, Kate, ed. (2015). "Disruption". ISEA 2015: Vancouver. New Forms Art Press, artists and writers. ISBN 9780987835413.
- Cooper, Michael; Cutler, Marty; Jones, Sarah; Lacerra, Steve; et al. (February 2015). "The 2015 Electronic Musician Editors' Choice Awards". Electronic Musician. 31 (2): 20–36. ISSN 0884-4720.
- Flood, Lauren (2016). Building and Becoming: DIY Music Technology in New York and Berlin (PhD thesis). Columbia University. doi:10.7916/D8W95918.
- Richards, John (2017). "DIY and Maker Communities in Electronic Music". In Collins, Nick; d'Escrivan, Julio (eds.). The Cambridge Companion to Electronic Music (2nd ed.). Cambridge University Press. pp. 238–257. doi:10.1017/9781316459874.015. ISBN 9781107133556.
- Robair, Gino (March 2014). "littleBits Synth Kit". Electronic Musician. 30 (3): 54. ISSN 0884-4720.
- Robair, Gino (June 2015). "MIDI, CV, and USB I/O". Electronic Musician. 31 (6): 62. ISSN 0884-4720.
