= Journal of Open Hardware =

- Language: English
- Edited by: Tobias Wenzel and Luis Felipe R. Murillo

Publication details
- History: 2017-present
- Publisher: University of Western Ontario
- Open access: diamond open access

Standard abbreviations
- ISO 4: J. Open Hardw.

Indexing
- ISSN: 2514-1708

Links
- Journal homepage

The Journal of Open Hardware is a peer-reviewed, diamond open access scientific journal for open-source hardware development. The Journal publishes Hardware Metapapers which describe open-source research hardware, and is the currently the only scientific journal extending its peer review to hardware documentations hosted on external platforms.

The Journal also publishes full-length articles on Issues in Open Hardware—including socio-economic and legal issues related to open hardware—and review articles. The journal's encourages papers from across academic, professional, and non-academic communities.

The journal is notable -- along with HardwareX with which it competes -- for pioneering the definition of OSH both as an academic field and as a legal engineering concept. It has done this by defining its own publication requirements including details for how files are archived and licensed, and the quality of build instructions and bill of materials considered sufficient for replication of builds. This influence goes beyond its own publications to encourage other OSH projects, such as those found on github, to adopt similar standards.

The Journal of Open Hardware has strict guidelines to ensure that hardware complies with the OSHWA definition for open source hardware, allowing hardware to be released under either copyleft licences (such as the CERN OHL or TAPR) or permissive open source licences. The Journal also requires projects to be documented up to a defined standard which is in line with the GOSH quality sharing guidelines.

The journal was founded in 2017, originally edited and reviewed by volunteers but published as open access by a commercial publisher, Ubiquity Press, using article processing fees. The publisher's proposed increases to these APCs led to conflict between the journal's open source ethics and the publisher's profit model, and in 2023 the Editorial Board left the publisher and transformed the journal into a diamond open access journal. This means that in addition to being Creative Commons licensed, articles are also free of charge to publish, with the editorial work being done entirely by volunteers, typically authors of previous publications who help to maintain quality standards.

== Abstracting and indexing ==
The journal is abstracted and indexed in CrossRef and SHERPA/RoMEO.

All metadata can be harvested via OAI-PMH.
