= TAPR =

TAPR can mean:

- Tucson Amateur Packet Radio
- TAPR Open Hardware License
