= AXIOM (camera) =

Series of open-hardware cinema cameras

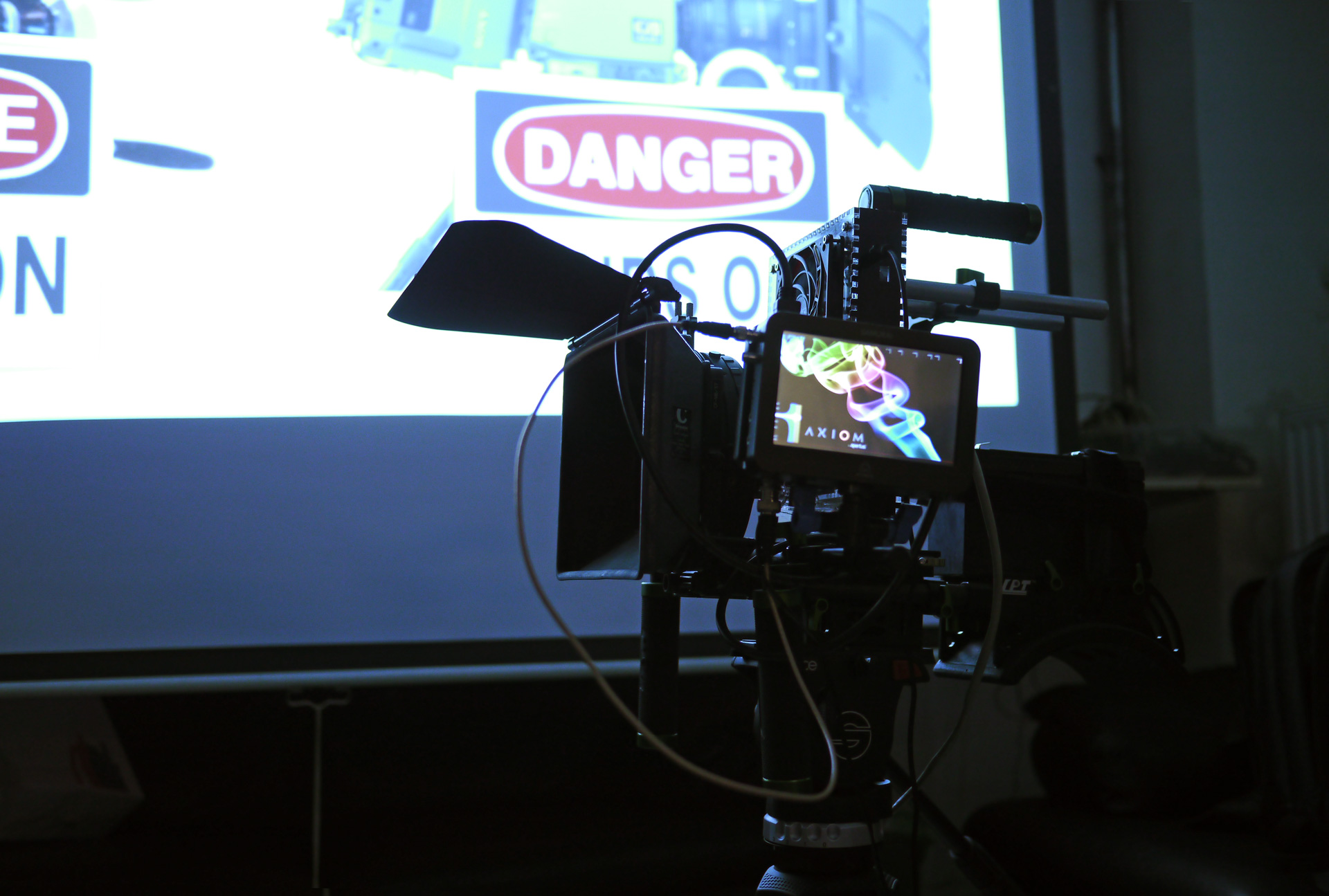
- AXIOM Alpha prototype at the Metalab Vienna

Overview
- Type: Digital cinema camera

Lens
- Lens mount: E-mount as standard

Sensor/medium
- Sensor: CMV12000
- Sensor type: Digital
- Sensor size: "APS-like"
- Sensor maker: ams Sensors Belgium
- Maximum resolution: 4096×3072 pixel
- Storage media: External

Focusing
- Focus: Manual

Flash
- Flash: External

Shutter
- Frame rate: 300 fps (10 bit); 132 fps (12 bit))
- Shutter: Global shutter

General
- Dimensions: 111.76×65.1×73.5 mm (4.400×2.563×2.894 in)
- Weight: 319 g (11 oz) (ABI:Dev Kit)

AXIOM is an open hardware and free software digital cinema camera family of devices being developed by a DIY community around the apertus° project.

The community’s second generation camera, AXIOM Beta Compact, is presently in development.

== History ==
In 2006 Oscar Spierenburg, a Dutch film director, noticed a discussion taking place on DVInfo.net entitled “3 channel 36 bit 1280 X 720 low $ camera”, inside which Elphel cameras, which are typically used in scientific applications, had been mentioned.

In the same year a discussion thread entitled "High Definition with Elphel model 333 camera" was posted on the DVInfo.net forum, whereupon the forum’s members discussed how best to adapt Elphel open hardware camera devices for use in film production. Sebastian Pichelhofer discovered this thread in 2008 and assisted with the project by developing an Elphel camera internal hard-disk recorder user interface.

By early 2009, and because over the course of three years upwards of 1000 posts had been submitted to this thread, the community realised that it was going to be difficult to maintain a full overview of the project in this way, and consequently a dedicated website was established. All of the decision making and naming/logo design was decided upon by the community.

After having done some contracting work with Elphel, Pichelhofer focused full-time on the project across 2011 and in July 2012 the plan to create an AXIOM camera hardware prototype from scratch, and thereby overcome some of the limitations that were found to be inherent with Elphel hardware at the time (mainly due to Elphel Inc. having shifted the company's core business focus towards development of a panoramic camera solution), was announced at the Libre Software Meeting in Geneva. This prototype became known as AXIOM Alpha and was intended to gather feedback from typical shooting scenarios with a view to incorporating ideas into a future, more modular, kit version of the camera aimed at developers and early adopters (AXIOM Beta Developer Kit).

Shortly after development on the AXIOM Alpha began, a nonprofit organization was established to provide legal shelter for the community, and an apertus° company was registered by Spierenburg in order to facilitate responsibilities that had been neglected up to this point, e.g. signing contracts with electronic part/service providers, paying for prototype manufacturing etc. Because of his drive and enthusiasm for the project Pichelhofer was elected apertus° Association chairman.

After reading a local hackerspace forum post in May 2013 Herbert Pötzl became aware of the community's efforts and met with Pichelhofer shortly thereafter. Pötzl had an extensive background in electronics engineering and software development and was appointed AXIOM Technical Lead. After Pötzl helped to develop critical aspects of hardware and software the AXIOM Alpha prototype was showcased at the Vienna Hackerlab in March 2014 whilst rough planning for a more modular and powerful camera was well underway.

In 2014, after crowdfunding the research and development through Indiegogo, work began on creating AXIOM Beta – a five printed circuit board stack, FOSS and open-source hardware, digital cinema camera incorporating the ams Sensors Belgium CMV12000 CMOS image sensor.

In recent times, and because existing manufacturers have proved reluctant to open their protocols up to the wider world, user groups have accepted responsibility and contributed to what became known as the ‘DSLR revolution’ first-hand e.g. the Magic Lantern (firmware) community. Magic Lantern is a free and open source software add-on that runs from a camera’s SD/CF card. It added a host of new features to Canon’s DSLRs that weren't included from the factory by Canon. Because the AXIOM Beta concept is essentially the hardware equivalent of the software they originally pioneered, Magic Lantern partnered with the apertus° Association in September 2014. Since then the Magic Lantern community has been involved with various colour science experiments using the camera.

Research on an AXIOM Gamma started in March 2015 after the project was awarded funding from the EU's Horizon2020 programme.

=== Timeline ===
Date	Model
10/07/2012	Sebastian Pichelhofer announces the project at the Libre Software Meeting in Geneva.
04/09/2012	apertus° receives an "Award of Distinction" by the Ars Electronica in the section "Digital Communities"
07/03/2014	Presentation of the proof of concept prototype at Metalab.
10/09/2014	apertus° commences partnership with Magic Lantern (firmware)
24/09/2014	Presentation of the apertus° Open Source Cinema Lab at the MuseumsQuartier Vienna at Artistic Bokeh
08/10/2014	AXIOM Beta development got funded through an Indiegogo crowdfunding campaign.
11/04/2015	AXIOM Beta prototype presented at National Broadcaster Association Show (NAB) in Las Vegas.
26/10/2015	AXIOM Presentation at OSCON, Amsterdam
28/12/2015	AXIOM Presentation at 32C3 (Chaos Communication Congress)
06/02/2016	AXIOM Presentation at Transmediale Berlin
11/07/2016	AXIOM was certified as Open Hardware by the OSHWA
04/05/2017	apertus° "Open Technology for Professional Film Production" accepted to Google's Summer of Code
21/06/2017	The AXIOM project gets exhibited at the Museum of Applied Arts, Vienna in the course of the Vienna Biennale – CityFactory: New Work. New Design
27/09/2017	apertus° AXIOM wins Open Minds Open Hardware Awards Vienna at DrupalCon 2017
15/02/2018	Neptec Design Group employ AXIOM Beta DK in case studies for planned upgrades to the Canadian Space Agency Special Purpose Dexterous Manipulator arm Dextre on-board the International Space Station
01/02/2019	Marseille Observatory (LAM - Laboratoire d'Astrophysique de Marseille) announce Curve One - the world's first 20MP, full-frame, curved image sensor. LAM used the AXIOM Beta DK to conduct all research and development.
02/05/2019	apertus° announce AXIOM Micro - a community-built, inexpensive camera PCB with a low-quality sensor devised for hardware and software development purposes.

== AXIOM Alpha ==
AXIOM Alpha was a digital cinema camera proof of concept prototype. Only two units were built in 2013 and the second revision model was presented at the Metalab (a Vienna-based Hackerspace) in spring 2014. The main components included a Zedboard using a Xilinx Zynq-7020 System on a chip (SoC) and a 4K Super35mm image sensor designed by the Belgian company CMOSIS (later renamed to ams Sensors Belgium after being acquired by ams).

=== Technical specifications ===
The ams Sensors Belgium CMV12000 Super35/APS-C image sensor has a resolution of 4096×3072 pixels, a color depth of 12 bits/pixel and is able to capture at a maximal frame rate of 300 frames/sec in 10-bit mode. It is connected to the ZedBoard over FMC. The Xilinx Zynq Z-7020 combines a Cortex-A9 dual-core with an FPGA. The ZedBoard contains the Zynq Z-7020 and all the necessary interfaces.

=== Software ===
The operating system is Linux kernel-based (Arch Linux) and composed entirely of free and open-source software.

== AXIOM Beta ==
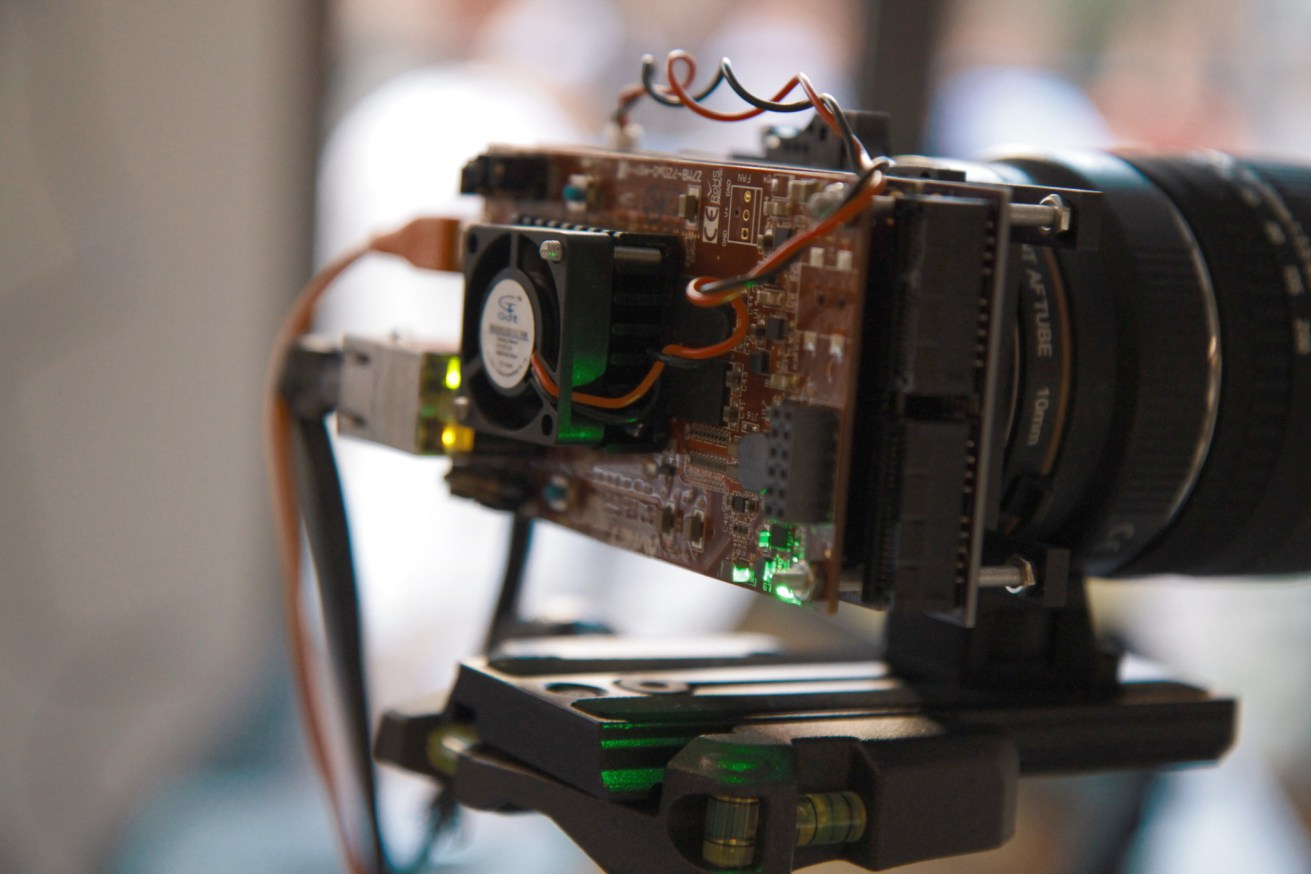
Early Axiom Beta

Successor of the AXIOM Alpha and the first 4K open hardware camera – the development of which was financed through an Indiegogo crowdfunding campaign that exceeded its funding goal.

AXIOM Beta utilizes the same 4K Super35 image sensor as its predecessor the AXIOM Alpha. The lens mount is a passive e-mount with Canon EF or Nikon F mount adapter. The first prototype of the AXIOM Beta was presented at the National Association of Broadcasters convention in Las Vegas.

Presently there are three enclosure versions for the camera expected:

AXIOM Beta Developer Kit (DK) – apertus° offers AXIOM Beta Developer Kit without an enclosure either in kit form or readily assembled. The AXIOM Beta DK provides easy access to the camera’s printed circuit boards and is aimed at those who want to work on software related development. With this in mind all associated design files, BOMs, and STL files (for CAD or 3D printing components such as a lightweight enclosure), software source code repositories, etc. are made freely available. First AXIOM Beta DK's began shipping in October 2016.

AXIOM Beta Compact (CP) – A more user-friendly version of the camera suited to photo and video production environments is intended to ship with a CNC-milled aluminium enclosure and a web-based GUI (graphical user interface) for controlling camera functions through a Wi-Fi connection. AXIOM Beta CP is in development.

AXIOM Beta Extended (EX) – A Shoulder mounted rig incorporating AXIOM Beta, larger cooling fans, data storage facilities and an on-board PC. At time of writing (November 2017) AXIOM Beta EX is presently in concept phase.

== AXIOM Gamma ==
AXIOM Gamma Prototype

Research into developing the AXIOM Gamma started in March 2015 after the project was awarded Horizon 2020 funding from the European Union. The project was coordinated by the University of Applied Arts Vienna and involved a consortium of European partners including apertus°, af inventions, Antmicro and DENZ. The AXIOM Gamma utilizes a modular hardware concept that allows the camera to be a fully extendible and repairable camera system. Research into the feasibility of AXIOM Gamma ceased in 2015 and many of its features were incorporated into the AXIOM Beta.

== See also ==
- Elphel Open Source Hardware Camera
- Open Source Hardware Association (OSHWA)
- Magic Lantern (firmware)
