= OHL =

OHL or Ohl may refer to:

== Initialisms ==
=== Sport ===
- Latvian Hockey Higher League, (Optibet hokeja līga in Latvian)
- Ontario Hockey League, Canada, a major junior ice hockey league
- Oud-Heverlee Leuven, a Belgian football club

=== Other initialisms ===
- Oberste Heeresleitung, the Supreme Army Command of Germany in World War I
- Obrascón Huarte Lain, a Spanish construction company
- Old Hill railway station, West Midlands, England
- Open Hardware License (disambiguation)
- Oral hairy leukoplakia, a type of oral pathology
- Overhead line, in railway electrification
- Ozburn-Hessey Logistics, a former American logistics company
- Overhung load, in regard to an electric motor; see Electric motor § Bearings

== People ==
- Don Ohl (1936–2024), American NBA professional basketball player
- Maude Andrews Ohl (1862–1943), American journalist, poet, novelist
- Russell Ohl (1898–1987), American crystal engineer recognized for patenting the modern solar cell
- Jean-Pierre Ohl (b. 1959), French author

== Places ==
- Ohl, Pennsylvania, an unincorporated community
