= Open Hardware License =

Open Hardware License may refer to:

- TAPR Open Hardware License
- CERN Open Hardware License
- Solderpad Hardware License, modified Apache2 to encompass design as well as copyright

== See also ==
- Open-source hardware
