= Elphel =

Camera manufacturer

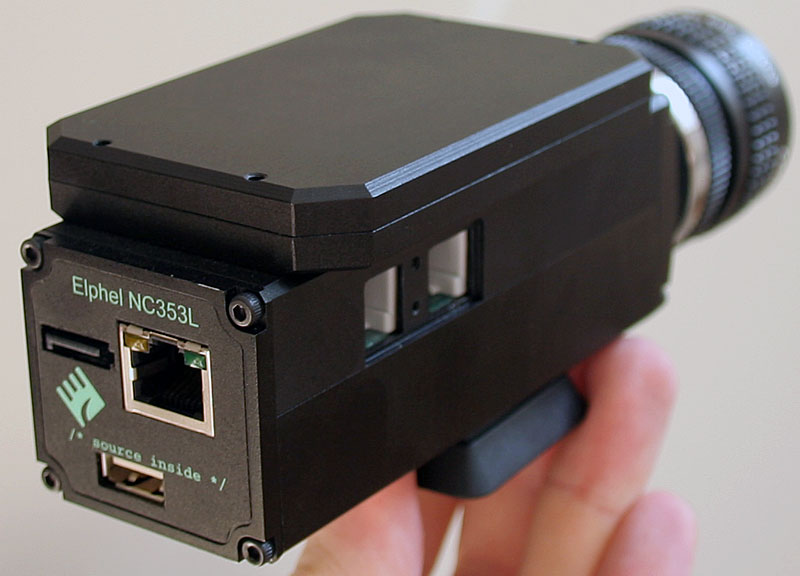
Elphel model 353 with internal HDD

Elphel, Inc. designs and manufactures open hardware and free software cameras. The company was founded in 2001 by Russian physicist Andrey Filippov, who emigrated to the US in 1995.

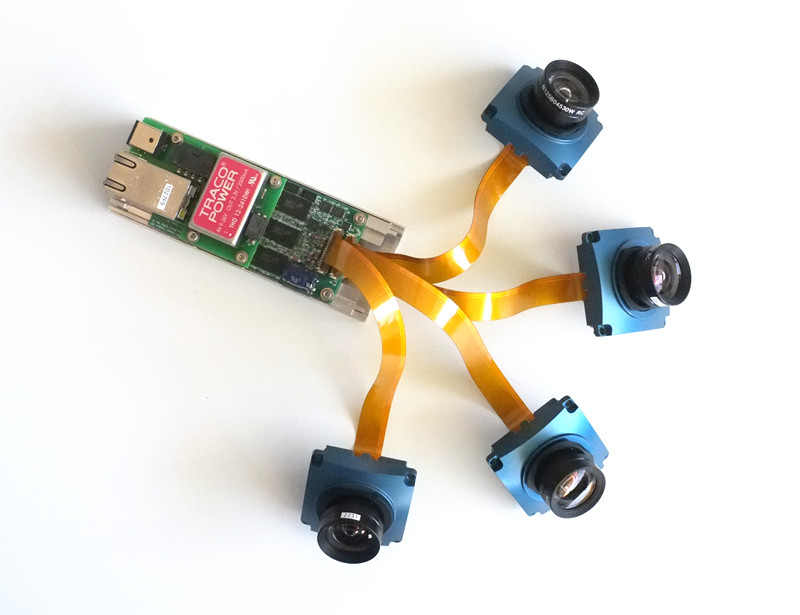
NC393 multisensor camera kit, for developers

Elphel cameras have been used to capture images for Google Street View and the Google Books project. The Moss Landing Marine Laboratories use Elphel cameras in their project called Submersible Capable of Under Ice Navigation and Imaging (SCINI) – an NSF-funded research project for robotic under the sea ice for surveying and exploration in Antarctica.

== See also ==
- AXIOM, an open source hardware 4K digital cinema camera
