= OGP =

OGP may refer to:

- OceanaGold Philippines, a subsidiary of a Canadian–Australian gold mining company
- International Association of Oil & Gas Producers, a global forum for petroleum producers
- Open Graph Protocol, enables web developers to integrate their pages into Facebook's social graph.
- Open Graphics Project, open source architecture and standard for graphics cards
- Open Government Partnership, an international organization launched in 2011
