= Open-source product development =

Open source product development (OSPD) refers to the development of open-source hardware products in a collaborative process allowing open participation from anyone, or the application of the open-source model in physical products.

== Characteristics ==
OSPD is characterized by the presence of two forms of openness:

- Product openness – the development of open source hardware products as defined by The Open Source Definition.
- Process openness – the possibility for anyone to take part in the collaborative development process.

Generally, OSPD processes are relevant for complex products, whose definition requires the collaborative integration of input from multiple contributors. This, however, does not exclude the existence of OSPD processes for simple products. OSPD specifies the concept of "open source innovation" as defined by Huizingh with complex tangible products.

Process openness requires that the product development process is performed by a "community". The word "community" is used in contrast to "company" or "team" in order to highlight three fundamental differences with the governance of conventional industrial product development.

- First, communities are groups of individual people whose affiliation to institutions or companies has little influence on the role they play in the product development project.
- Second, the participation of a member to a community is voluntary, that is, each member defines independently their involvement and the delivered workload is generally not paid.
- Third, the composition of a community is not set at the beginning of the project but is open for the participation of any interested person and evolves along the self-defined involvement of the community members.

OSPD is "collaborative" in that it is performed with a certain simultaneity or parallelism in the work provided by the community members. In other words, OSPD is characterized by "intention for co-development". Collaboration is defined as the coordinated work performed by a group using common material and following a common objective. It therefore delineates with sequential development loops of open source designs where a product is sequentially developed and released by an isolated member then reused, further developed and released again by another community member, and so on.

=== Further characteristics ===
- OSPD is mostly an internet phenomenon: continuity of work, acquisition of new members and collaboration in (eventually geographically distributed) communities are enabled by online data management and communication. The online platform has been described as the "core" of an OSPD project, whereas own research to be published shows that OSPD projects are not focused on one platform but tend to use several parallel tools and communication channels.
- In contrast to conventional industrial product development, the OSPD process is not characterized by clearly defined inputs, outputs and timelines, but is more of an ongoing continuous improvement process.
- OSPD projects are not embedded in formal organizations but are characterized by a low-level of restrictions, self-motivation, and self-selection of modular tasks that can be performed by a person.
- OSPD processes not only aim at generating a functioning and convivial technology but equally at personal development and process learning.
- The concept of OSPD implies the coexistence of three interwoven objects: a community involved in a project aiming at developing a product. While those three concepts are necessary for the emergence of OSPD, they do not necessarily have a 1:1 or same relation. There may be for example communities involved in different projects or projects aiming at developing different products.

== Delineation with other terms ==
- Not all open source hardware projects are OSPD projects. OSPD projects are those of the open source hardware projects where a community-based collaborative product development process takes place.
- OSPD delineates clearly with crowdsourcing. In crowdsourcing, the outcome of the collaborative product development process is protected, and the process is per definition centralized around a company or an institution. In OSPD, the outcome of the process is open source and the community is not necessarily centred around a company.
- The term open design may be used as an alternative to OSPD in literature. However, it is generally defined in less specific terms and is coined by conflicting definitions. Most of the available definitions do not refer simultaneously to product openness (the development of open source hardware products as defined by the Open Source Definition) and process openness (possibility to any interested person to take part in the collaborative development process).
  - Brulé and Valentin define openness in the context of open design as "the inclusion of people and their values during the project framing and ideation process" and as "a space left to users in the formalization process (choice of functions, interactions, aesthetics...)". Open design is in this sense the inclusion of the end user in the development of the artefact through the sharing of designs that are low constrained and can be customized. Although this definition refers in some way to both process and product openness, it is expressed in more generic terms than the provided OSPD definition.
  - In the Open Design Manifesto, Kadushin defines open design as "a method consist[ing] of two preconditions: 1. An Open Design is CAD information published online under a Creative Commons license to be downloaded, produced, copied and modified. 2. An Open Design product is produced directly from file by CNC machines and without special tooling." This definition does not refer to collaborative product development. This definition only refers to product openness.
  - In the "Open Design Definition v. 0.5", Manchinelli and colleagues define open design as "a design artifact project whose source documentation is made publicly available so that anyone can study, modify, distribute, make, prototype and sell the artifact based on that design. In this sense, the term open design is used as a synonym of open source hardware. It only refers to product openness.
  - The definition of Aitamurto et al. is the definition which is at the closest to the definition of OSPD provided here: open design is a "process providing public access to participation in the design process and to the product resulting from that process, as well as the data created in the design process, including technical details and other data and content gathered or generated during the process." In that sense, OSPD is a specification of open design where the terms of product openness are specified by the open source definition.
  - Ostuzzi et al. define open design as a product property, i.e. the spaces of freedom offered by a product so it can be appropriated and adapted to another context than the original one.
  - Buitenhuis and Pearce as well as use misleadingly the term open design as an equivalent to open source hardware, however including the collaborative aspect of developing open source hardware.
- Howard et al. also use the term open source development to name the "development of intangible as well as tangible products, through accessible and shareable platforms, where motivated communities with common practices share, adopt, produce and further develop innovative solutions, under commonly agreed credits and licensing. Open source development being free to anyone can still encompass revenue streams from related services and branding recognition, which enforce new business opportunities within the open source world." This term tends to be quite similar to the principle of OSPD, however not centered on a defined product.
