= Autonomous telepresence =

Method of remote healthcare

Autonomous telepresence is a method of offering remote healthcare in a patient's home using robots and videoconferencing systems to provide a consumer-based mobile platform. At present the existing systems have little or no autonomy and rely on remote operators.

== See also ==
- Telepresence
- Open-source robotics
