= OpenHPSDR =

Type of SDR radio

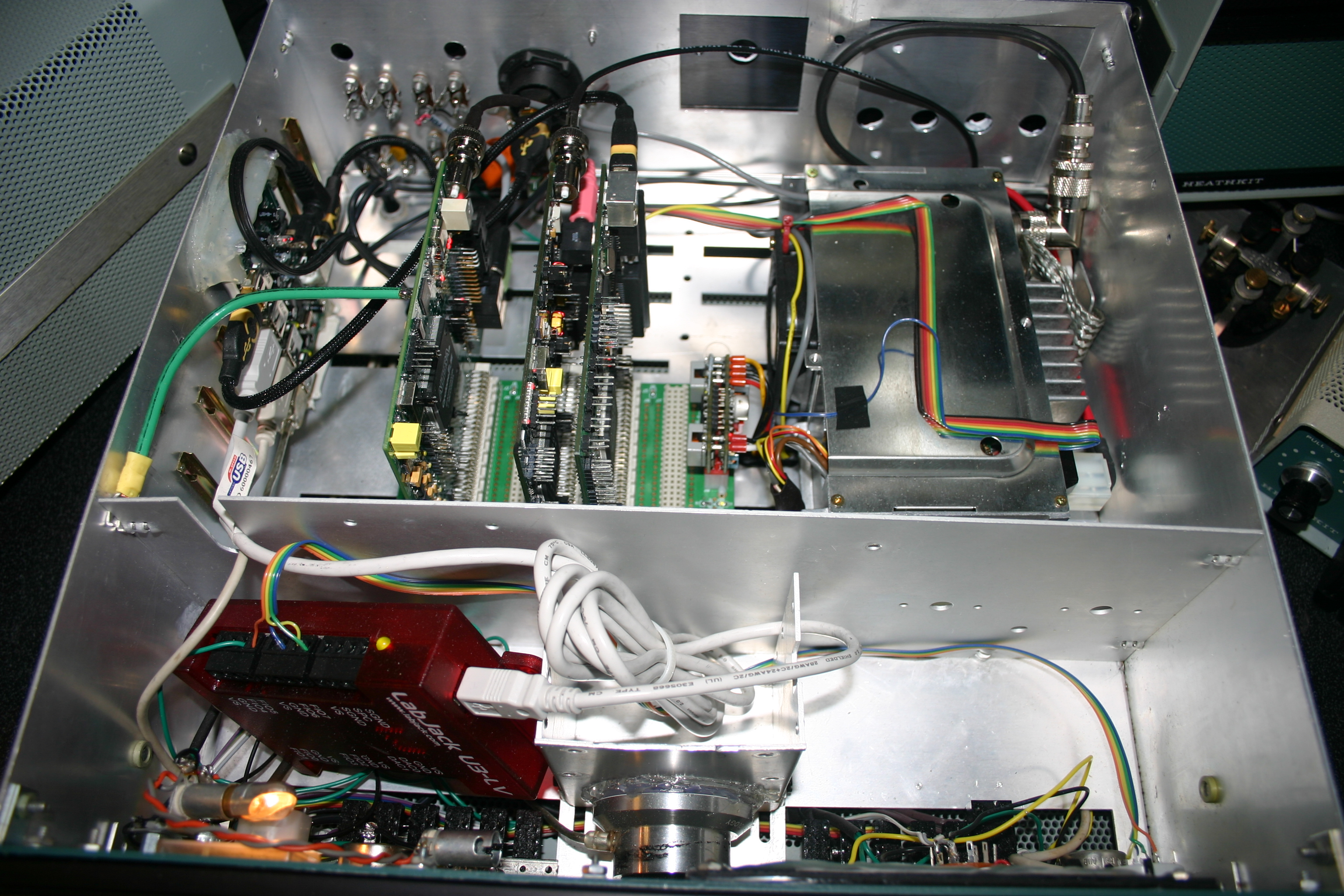
Amateur radio transceiver with HPSDR components

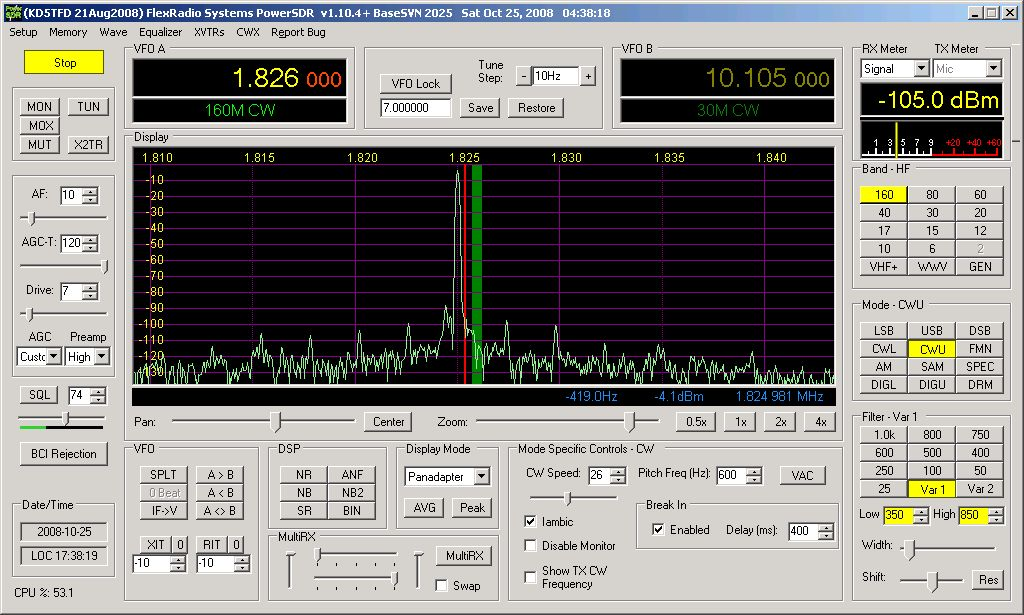
Receiver with spectrum in 160-meter band

The OpenHPSDR (High Performance Software Defined Radio) project dates from 2005 when Phil Covington, Phil Harman, and Bill Tracey combined their separate projects to form the HPSDR group. It is built around a modular concept which encourages experimentation with new techniques and devices (e.g. SDR, Envelope Elimination and Restoration) without the need to replace the entire set of boards. The project has expanded from the original group, and several additional people have been involved in recent HPSDR module designs.

The core modules of the project are the Atlas passive backplane, the Ozy interface which provides a USB 2.0 data channel between the HPSDR system and the host PC, and the Mercury and Penelope receiver and exciter boards, which use high speed ADCs and DACs for direct conversion of received or transmitted signals in the DC to 55 MHz frequency range.

Mercury has attracted wide interest within the HPSDR community as a general-coverage, high performance, HF receiver. It uses a 16-bit 135MSPS analog-to-digital converter that provides performance over the range 0 to 55 MHz comparable to that of a conventional analog HF radio. The receiver will also operate in the VHF and UHF range using either mixer image or alias responses. The host computer uses DSP techniques to process the digital bitstream it receives from the HPSDR system. Currently, the HPSDR hardware has been interfaced with the Flex-Radio PowerSDR Windows-based software, which is licensed under the GPL.

As of February, 2011, the following HPSDR modules have been released:

- Atlas backplane
- Magister control board
- Janus I/Q interface board
- Mercury Direct Down-conversion receiver
- LPU linear power supply
- Pandora enclosure
- Excalibur frequency reference board
- PennyWhistle 20 watt RF power amplifier
- Hercules 100 watt RF power amplifier
- Metis 1Gigbit (1000T) PC interface board

Other modules nearing release include:

- Alex RX/TX filter bank

Replaced by newer modules:

- Ozy USB control board (replaced by Magister)
- Penelope Direct Up-conversion exciter (replaced by PennyLane, not provided by TAPR but by new commercial organisation)

In cooperation with the HPSDR group, TAPR has provided (or will provide) all the modules listed above. Most have been made available as either fully assembled units or as bare circuit boards; a few are available as kits of parts.

Several other modules are under development. A web site and Wiki provide further information about the HPSDR projects. .

The HPSDR project is open-source for software and uses a combination of licenses for the hardware.

== Spin-off hardware ==
There are many complete transceivers that are based on the OpenHPSDR concept:

- Anan-10
- Anan-100
- Anan-100D
- Anan-200D
- Anan-7000DLE
- Anan-8000DLE

== See also ==
- Universal Software Radio Peripheral
- Software-defined radio
- Digital radio
