= LittleBits =

American electronics company

littleBits
- Founded: September 2011; 15 years ago
- Founder: Ayah Bdeir
- Headquarters: New York City, United States
- Website: littlebits.com

littleBits is a New York City-based startup that makes an open source library of modular electronics (open-source electronics), which snap together with small magnets for prototyping and learning. The company's goal is to democratize hardware the way software and printing have been democratized. The littleBits mission is to "put the power of electronics in the hands of everyone, and to break down complex technologies so that anyone can build, prototype, and invent." littleBits units are available in more than 70 countries and used in more than 2,000 schools. The company was named to CNN's 10 Startups to Watch for 2013.

== History and funding ==
littleBits began as a small project in 2008 that Ayah Bdeir, the company's founder and CEO, created for a group of New York designers. She launched littleBits in September 2011. In June 2015, littleBits raised $44.2 million in Series B funding led by DFJ Growth. In November 2013, littleBits received $11.1 million in funding led by True Ventures and Foundry Group, with participation from Two Sigma Ventures, Vegas Tech Fund, and Khosla Ventures, among others.

== Products ==
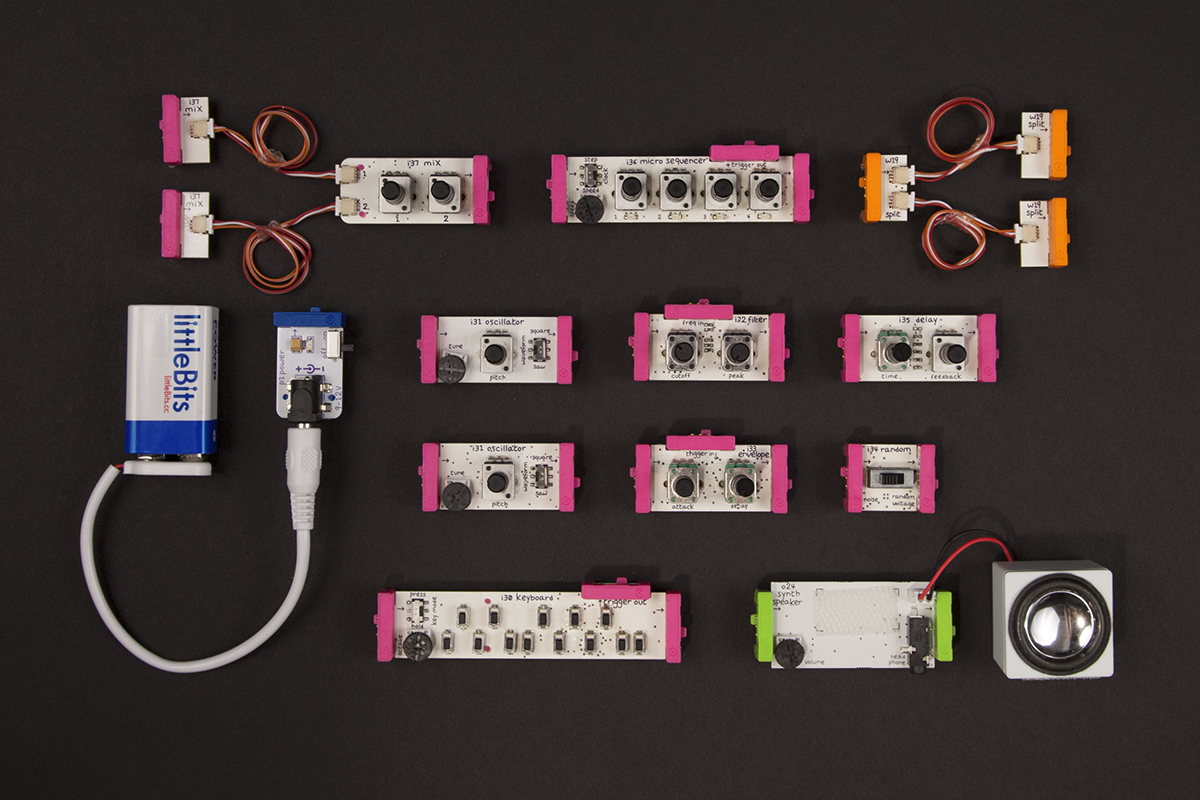
The LittleBits synth kit

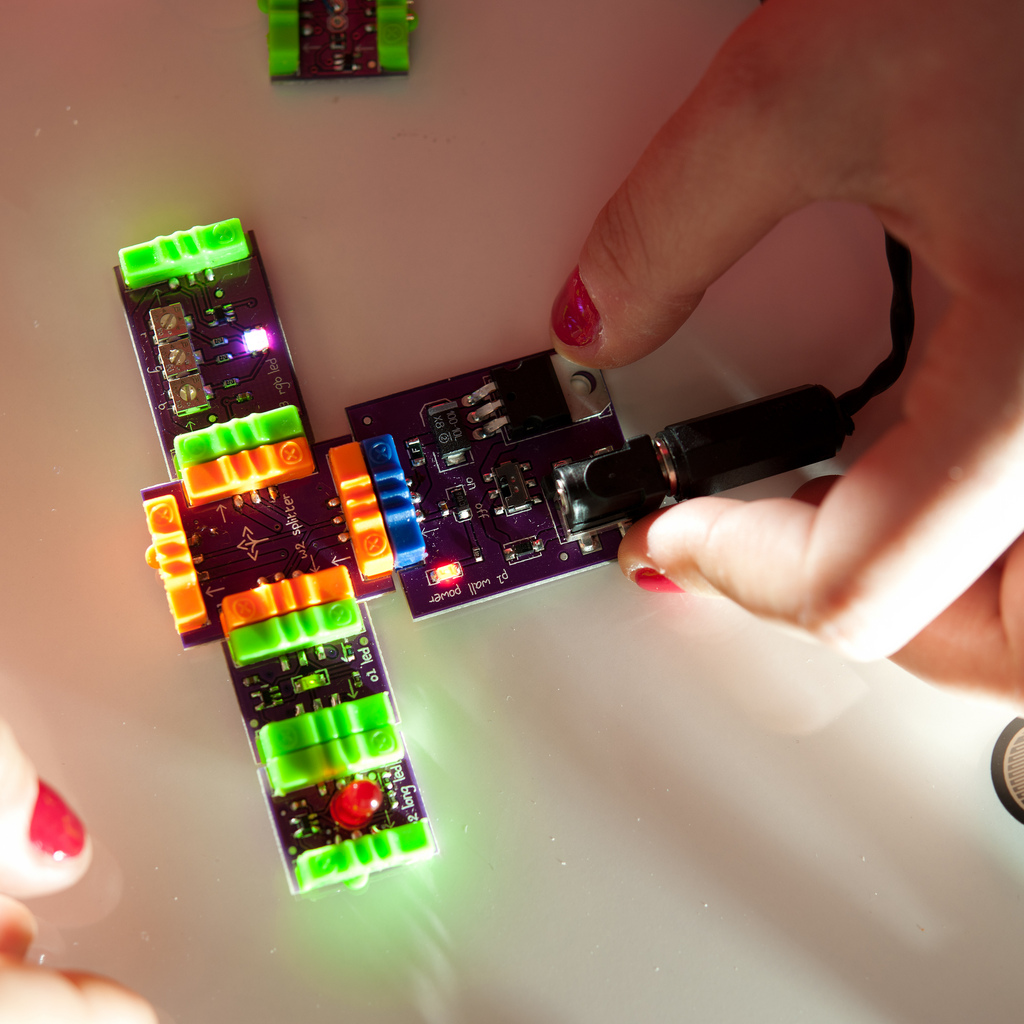
A system assembled using littleBits modules

In August 2013, the company released the Base, Premium and Deluxe Kits, the first kits to feature the current bits and modules. The goal is to make getting started with littleBits easier and containing the most important modules than other kits.

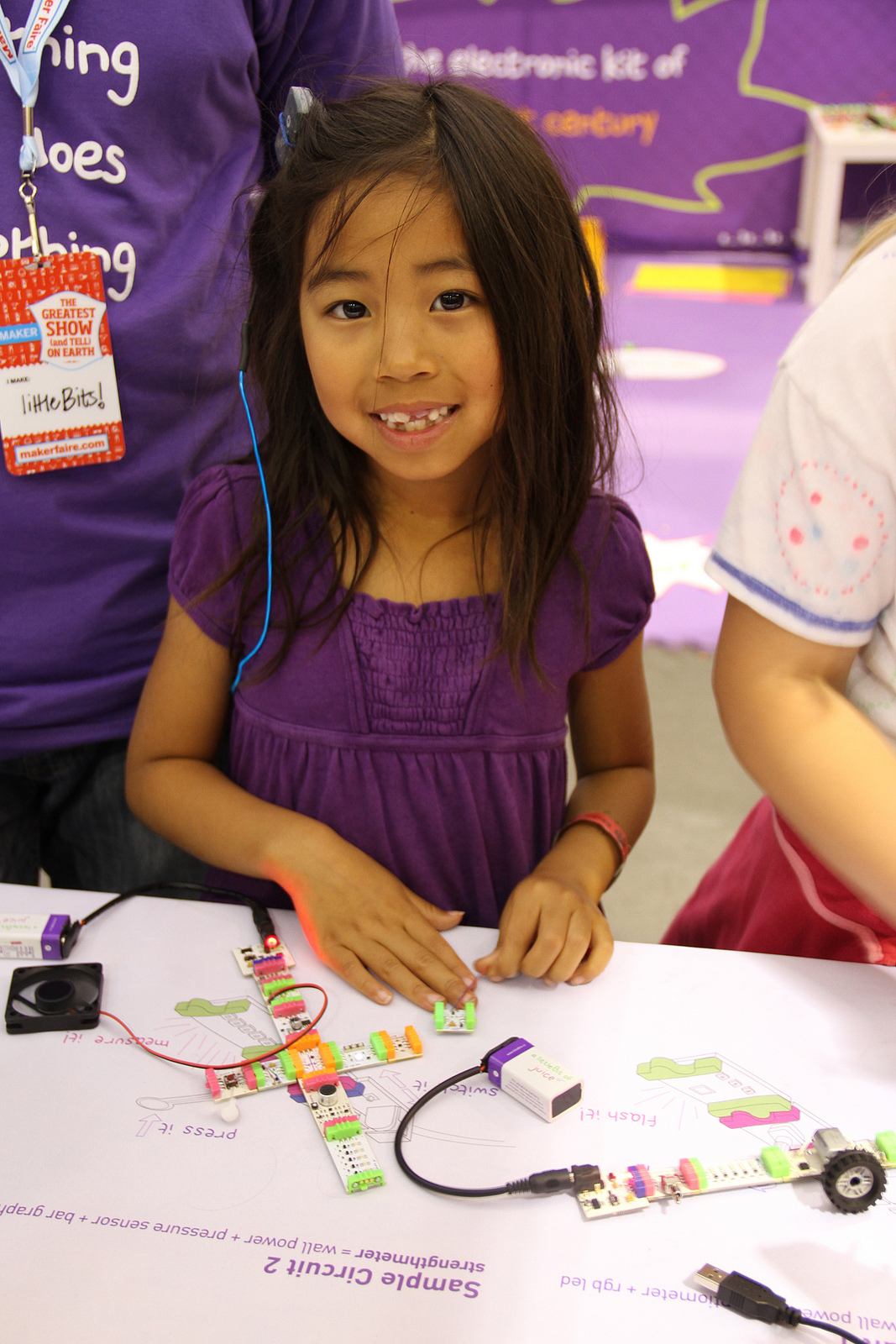
Girl playing with littleBits.

In July 2014, littleBits introduced cloudBit, a WiFi-enabled module that lets builders add Internet connectivity to their designs. The goal is to give "the average person an easy and open way to contribute to the Internet of Things" using an open-source platform comparable to Linux or Android to build such things as a remote control for coffee makers, heating/cooling systems, or other appliances. In November 2014, the company released the Smart Home Kit, designed to let builders "hack together versions of familiar smart-home concepts—connected coffee pots and presence-aware lamps—or create solutions of their own devising." Using the modules, builders could test smart home gadgets of their own designs to "feel out this new territory for themselves" instead of "taking some company’s word on what your smart home should be."

== Uses and partnerships ==
LittleBits consists of small circuit boards with specific functions built to snap together with magnets without soldering, wiring, or programming. Each bit has its own specific function, such as light, sound, sensors, or buttons. There are "trillions of billions of combinations" possible in the littleBits open source library. NASA has collaborated with littleBits to design projects for a littleBits ‘Space Kit.’ Projects include building a model Mars rover and the wireless transmission of music to a model of the International Space Station. In October 2014, the Space Kit won a Fast Company "Innovation by Design" award. In 2013, littleBits partnered with the Museum of Modern Art Stores in New York to build two window displays, which included a giant ferris wheel "propelled by a miniature cyclist" and a "mad scientist controlling a nearly life-sized puppet." Also in 2013, littleBits collaborated with KORG to create the Synth Kit, allowing users to build a DIY synthesizer or create musical instruments. In 2018 LittleBits STEAM Student Set was certified by the Education Alliance Finland for pedagogical quality. In 2017, littleBits partnered with Disney to develop the Droid Inventor Kit, codeveloped with the design team at Lucasfilm. The Droid Inventor Kit was named Top Creative Toy of the Year by the Toy Foundation.

== Marketplace and retail store ==
In September 2014, littleBits announced bitLab, a marketplace for products built using littleBits kits and modules. The "app store for hardware" is the "first marketplace for user-generated hardware" (according to Bdeir) and has the potential to become "the most extensive platform for hardware creation and innovation available." In July 2015, littlebits opened a retail store in Soho, Manhattan. The store has an innovative retail model that allows users to either use the littlebits product for free in-store ("Inventions to Stay"), or to build something, pay for the components, and take it away ("Inventions to Go").

== Role in Maker movement ==
The first launch of littleBits was at Makerfaire 2009. littleBits won Editor's Choice awards in 2009 and 2011 from MAKE magazine. The company has organized a series of hackathons and workshops to encourage active participation in science and technology. CEO Bdeir was named to Popular Mechanics’ 25 Makers Who Are Reinventing the American Dream in 2014, Inc.’s 35 Under 35 Coolest Entrepreneurs, and Fast Company's Most Creative People of 2013.

== Sphero acquisition ==
In August 2019, Sphero completed acquisition of LittleBits for an undisclosed sum, giving Sphero a combined portfolio of over 140 patents in robotics, electronics, software, and the internet of things (IoT). Since the acquisition, the web links included in all the original products to the original littlebits.cc website information no longer operate. As part of the company transfer, Sphero shut down cloudbit servers and discontinued support for the Littlebits Cloudbit.
