= LinuxFund =

Organization for Open Source Software

LinuxFund is an organization that has been raising money and making donations to Free and Open Source Software (FOSS) projects since 1999.

IRS 501(c)(3) status was granted to Linux Fund in August 2007, allowing direct solicitations to individuals and charitable foundations.

Prior to receiving the 501(c)(3) letter, the principal funding source had been an affinity credit card program with credit cards bearing a graphic of Tux, the Linux Penguin. Visa cards are offered in the US by US Bank.

== Roots ==
Linux Fund was founded at the peak of the 1999 high-tech boom with an affinity credit card from MBNA. They gave away their first T-shirt in the summer of 1999 at the LinuxWorld Expo. By the summer of 2000, their Grants to Developers Program had begun.

== Confusion and stagnation ==
A few years after surviving the dot-com bubble, the organization fell into stagnation. In June 2005, investigating reports that their website was down, NewsForge's Jay Lyman revealed that the organization was not actively distributing funds to FOSS projects. Lyman reported that funds from the MBNA cards continued to flow and the organization had $126,155.29 (and growing) in the bank. Then-executive-director, Jerritt Collord, told Lyman that he had gotten "burned out" and that the "largely one-man organization" was sitting idle after lackluster success with his Open Oregon Technology Center.

== Rebuilding ==
In the Fall of 2005 the founding directors met, decided to clean up the organizational backlog and start funding FOSS projects again.

In June 2005, Bank of America bought MBNA. In April 2007, Bank of America gave Linux Fund notice that the affinity MasterCard program would be discontinued effective June 30, 2007.

On July 1, 2007 US Bank released a Linux Fund Visa card.

In August 2007 the IRS granted Linux Fund 501(c)(3) status.

In May 2009 the Open Hardware Foundation joined Linux Fund.

== Projects ==
Prior to cancellation by Bank of America, Linux Fund was supporting about 10 different projects including Debian, the Wikimedia Foundation, Blender (software), Free Geek, freenode, and OpenSSH. A typical grant was $500/month with renewable 6 and 12-month commitments. Linux Fund has also given lump-sum donations on the order of $1,000–$5,000.

Project funding was frozen briefly when Bank of America canceled the USA MasterCard agreement. Funding has since resumed with the new US Bank Visa card. Current projects include a mix of open-source software and hardware projects including Gnash, Inkscape, LiVES, and the Open Graphics Project.

== Sources ==
- http://www.linuxfund.org/team/
- "Linux art stunt takes jab at Microsoft". News.com. 1999-10-08. Archived from the original on 2012-10-22.
- http://ask.slashdot.org/article.pl?sid=05/06/03/1845234
- Article title
