= HardwareX =

- Language: English

Publication details
- History: 2017-present
- Publisher: Elsevier
- Open access: Gold Open Access
- Impact factor: 1.9 (2025)

Standard abbreviations
- ISO 4: HardwareX

Links
- Journal homepage; Online access; Twitter

HardwareX is a peer-reviewed open access scientific journal dedicated to open source hardware for scientific experimental equipment. The journal publishes science hardware shared under an open source hardware license. Published articles include science hardware over a broad range of scientific disciplines, from life science and engineering research, to ecological and environmental monitoring, to digital manufacturing (e.g. 3D printing), to educational tools.

Together with the competing journal Journal of Open Hardware, it has popularized the ideas of open-source hardware and open science, and helped to define general standards for acceptable quality of design documentation. Its standards are similar to but different from those of JOH, and rivalry between the two journals helps to evolve and maintain these standards. Compared to JOH's focus on general engineering systems, HardwareX tends to have more focus specifically on scientific equipment for academic science labs.
