= Ayah Bdeir =

Lebanese-Canadian entrepreneur, inventor, and interactive artist

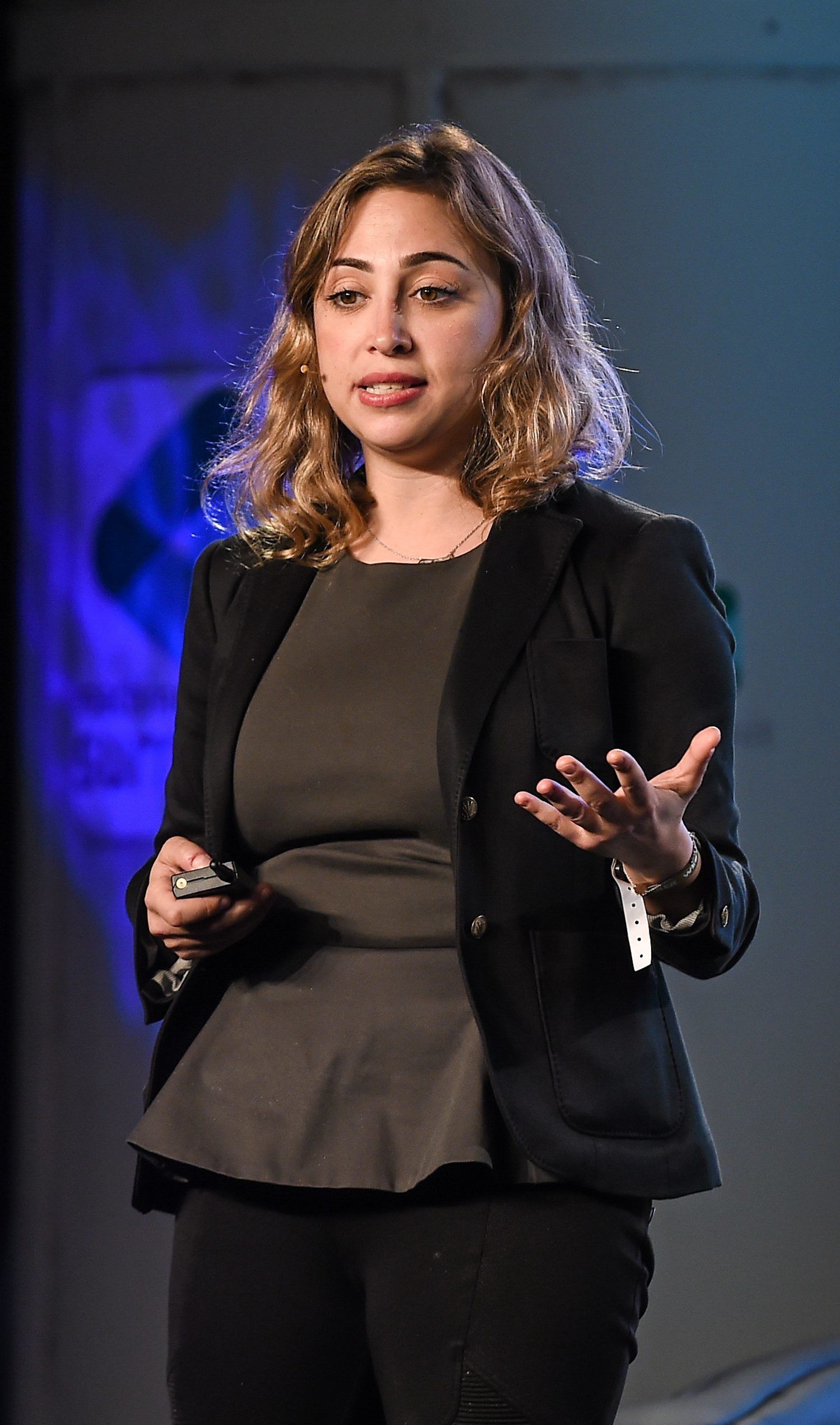
- Ayah Bdeir in November 2014
- Born: 1982 (age 43–44); Montreal, Quebec, Canada
- Education: MS Media Arts and Sciences, Media Lab, Massachusetts Institute of Technology (2006); BS Computer Engineering and Social Sciences, American University of Beirut (2004)
- Organization(s): littleBits; Daleel Thawra; Mozilla
- Movement: Maker Movement; Open-source hardware STEAM; Gender neutrality in Education
- Website: www.ayahbdeir.com

Ayah Bdeir (Arabic: آية بدير; born 1982 in Montreal, Quebec) is a Lebanese-Syrian-Canadian entrepreneur, inventor, and innovator. She is the inventor of littleBits, a company that produces modular electronics kits for education and prototyping, and that was acquired by Sphero in 2019. She is also the co-founder of Daleel Thawra, a directory of protests, initiatives, donations for the Lebanese Revolution.

Bdeir is also known for her contributions to the Maker Movement, advocacy for open-source hardware, and her promotion of gender-neutrality in STEAM education. She co-founded the Open Hardware Summit and has been recognized as a TED Senior Fellow.

Bdeir was named one of BBC's 100 Most Influential Women, has appeared on the covers of The New York Times Magazine, WIRED and the Wall Street Journal. Her inventions are included in the permanent collection of The Museum of Modern Art (MoMA) and she holds over a dozen patents.

== Biography ==
Bdeir was born in Canada to a Syrian family and raised in Beirut. She pursued undergraduate degrees in Computer Engineering and Sociology from the American University of Beirut, graduating in 2004. Bdeir then moved to the United States, where she earned a Master of Science degree from the MIT Media Lab in 2006.

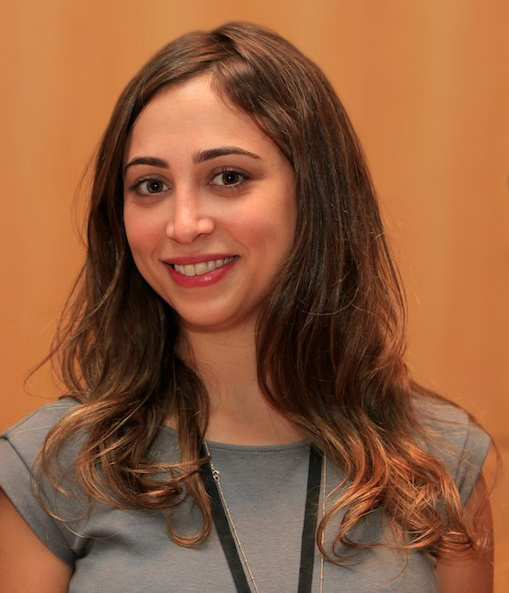
Ayah Bdeir in 2010

After earning her master's degree, Bdeir started working as a financial consultant. She was then awarded a fellowship at Eyebeam in New York City in 2008, where she produced electronic art work that was shown in conferences, festivals and galleries in Amsterdam, Paris, New York, Rhode Island, Boston, São Paulo and others. Bdeir taught graduate classes at NYU's Interactive Telecommunications Program (ITP) and Parsons The New School for Design. In 2010, Bdeir served as a design mentor on the reality TV show, Stars of Science.

Bdeir was a Senior Advisor at the Mozilla Foundation from 2023-2026, and in January 2026 announced that she would be joining CurrentAI as the CEO.

She was a TED Fellow and serves on the board of the Fund for Public Schools supporting NYC's 1,800 public schools.

=== littleBits ===
Bdeir focused much of her work on empowering people, particularly those from underrepresented communities and girls, to become agents of change. In September 2011, she started littleBits Electronics, a startup with the goal to make electronics accessible for everyone. The company was officially established after Bdeir sold her first prototype at the maker faire in New York. LittleBits was soon after dubbed as "Lego for the iPad Generation" by Bloomberg TV.

LittleBits produces a system of modular electronic building blocks designed for learning and prototyping. These modules are rectangular in shape, measuring between one and four inches in length, and contain specific circuitry hidden within. The system employs a color-coded design to indicate functionality: blue modules provide power, pink modules enable various inputs such as switches, microphones, and motion sensors, green modules facilitate outputs like lights, motors, and speakers, while orange modules offer wires or logic functions. The modules use magnetic connections, which are designed to guide users in assembling circuits. The modular components allow users with no prior engineering experience to create various electronic projects and to experiment with complex technologies.

In 2012, Bdeir received the TED Fellowship and gave a talk at the TED conference in Long Beach called "Building Blocks That Blink, Beep and Teach."

In 2012, Bdeir raised $3.65 million in series A funding for the company. The funding was led by was led by True Ventures, with participation from Khosla Ventures, O'Reilly AlphaTech Ventures and Lerer Ventures. Then in 2013, her company secured another round of funding led by True Ventures and Foundry Group, with participation from firms such as Two Sigma and Vegas Tech Fund.

In 2013, littleBits was recognized as one of 10 emerging startups by CNN, and received the Gold Award from the Industrial Designers Society of America.

In June 2015, littleBits raised $44.2 million in a series B round funding from Taha Mikati, Wamda Capital, MENA Venture Investors, and Hutham Olayan. LittleBits then joined the 2016 Disney Accelerator program. It has also partnered with Pearson, one of the leading curriculum companies in the world to co-create curriculum to support their Science and Engineering program.

By 2019, littleBits' products were used in over 20,000 schools. That year, the company and Disney collaborated for "Snap the Gap," a $4 million pilot program aimed at maintaining girls' interest in technology around age 10. The program pairs each participant with a mentor who is a professional in a STEM field.

LittleBits was acquired by Sphero in August 2019.

== Advocacy ==
Bdeir has spoken publicly about the Maker Movement, emphasizing the democratization of technology and the empowerment of individuals to become creators, not just consumers. She has used platforms like TED, SXSW, Solid, and CreativeMornings where she discussed open-source innovation and the Internet of Things.

Bdeir is a proponent of the Open Hardware Movement, an initiative aimed at ensuring that technological knowledge is accessible to everyone, and co-founded the Open Hardware Summit, an annual conference organized by the Open Source Hardware Association. In 2010, Bdeir was awarded a fellowship with Creative Commons for her work in defining Open Hardware and for co-chairing the Open Hardware Summits of 2010 and 2011.

As a fellow at Creative Commons, she led the public competition for the Open Hardware logo—now adopted on millions of circuit boards around the world. Bdeir has published academic papers and coined the term "Electronics As Material," which is the idea of "thinking of electronics as material that can be combined with other traditional ones."

Bdeir also advocates for gender neutrality in toys. According to her, 40% of littleBits users are girls, which she states is four times the average in STEM/STEAM fields.

In 2017, Bdeir advocated for immigration rights in response to President Trump's immigration ban. She publicly opposed the policy by placing a large billboard in Times Square with the slogan "We Invent the World We Want to Live In."

In October 2019, Bdeir co-founded Daleel Thawra, a digital platform that became the central source of information and resources related to the Lebanese revolution.

== Art works ==
Prior to littleBits, Bdeir worked as an interactive artist. She has exhibited work at the Peacock Visual Arts gallery (Aberdeen), the New Museum (New York), Ars Electronica (Linz) and the Royal College of Art (London). Installations include:

- Random Search, a wearable technology project that documents airport security screening experiences. The garment contains sensors that record data during security searches, collecting and analyzing information about airport screening procedures and their impact on travelers.
- Elusive Electricity (Ejet Ejet)
- Teta Haniya's Secrets
- Les Annees Lumiere
- Arabiia

== Shows and exhibitions ==
- "Energy", MoMA (Museum of Modern Art) (New York), 2020
- "This is for Everyone: Design Experiments for the Common Good", MoMA (Museum of Modern Art) (New York), 2016
- "Subtitled: Narratives From Lebanon", RCA (Royal College of Art) (London), 2011
- "Talk To Me", MoMA (Museum of Modern Art) (New York), 2011
- "Electronics as Materials", Eyebeam (New York), 2010
- "7 on 7", New Museum (New York), 2010
- "Identities in Motion", Peacock Visual Arts Gallery (Aberdeen, Scotland), 2009
- "Impetus", Ars Electronica (Linz, Austria), Works from the MIT Media Lab, curated by Hiroshi Ishii & Amanda Parkes, 2009
- "Open Stitch", Location One Gallery (New York), 2005

== Awards and recognitions ==
- 2012 TED Fellowship
- 2014 35 Innovators Under 35 by MIT Technology Review
- 2014 25 Makers Who Are Reinventing the American Dream by Popular Mechanics
- 2014 35 Under 35 Coolest Entrepreneurs by Inc. Magazine
- 2018 Top 5 Women to Watch in Robotics by Inc. Magazine
- 2019 100 most influential women by BBC
- 2019 New York Times Groundbreaker
