= Open-source hardware =

Hardware whose design source files are made available

The "open source hardware" logo proposed by OSHWA, one of the main defining organizations

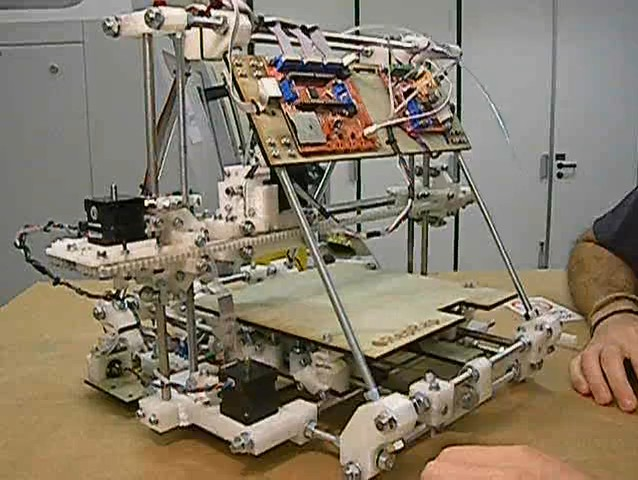
The RepRap Mendel general-purpose 3D printer with the ability to make copies of most of its own structural parts

Open-source hardware (OSH, OSHW) is hardware whose design source files — schematics, CAD files, bill of materials — are made publicly available, allowing anyone to study, modify, make and distribute the hardware. Both free and open-source software (FOSS) and open-source hardware are created by this open-source culture movement and apply a similar concept to a variety of components. It is sometimes, thus, referred to as free and open-source hardware (FOSH), meaning that the design is easily available ("open") and that it can be used, modified and shared freely ("free"). The term usually means that information about the hardware is easily discerned so that others can make it – coupling it closely to the maker movement. Hardware design (i.e. mechanical drawings, schematics, bills of material, PCB layout data, HDL source code and integrated circuit layout data), in addition to the software that drives the hardware, are all released under free/libre terms. The original sharer gains feedback and potentially improvements on the design from the FOSH community. There is now significant evidence that such sharing can drive a high return on investment for the scientific community.

It is not enough to merely use an open-source license; an open source product or project will follow open source principles, such as modular design and community collaboration.

Since the rise of reconfigurable programmable logic devices, sharing of logic designs has been a form of open-source hardware. Instead of the schematics, hardware description language (HDL) code is shared. HDL descriptions are commonly used to set up system-on-a-chip systems either in field-programmable gate arrays (FPGA) or directly in application-specific integrated circuit (ASIC) designs. HDL modules, when distributed, are called semiconductor intellectual property cores, also known as IP cores.

Open-source hardware also helps alleviate the issue of proprietary device drivers for the free and open-source software community, however, it is not a pre-requisite for it, and should not be confused with the concept of open documentation for proprietary hardware, which is already sufficient for writing FLOSS device drivers and complete operating systems. The difference between the two concepts is that OSH includes both the instructions on how to replicate the hardware itself as well as the information on communication protocols that the software (usually in the form of device drivers) must use in order to communicate with the hardware (often called register documentation, or open documentation for hardware), whereas open-source-friendly proprietary hardware would only include the latter without including the former.

== History ==
The first hardware-focused "open source" activities were started around 1997 by Bruce Perens, creator of the Open Source Definition, co-founder of the Open Source Initiative, and a ham radio operator. He launched the Open Hardware Certification Program, which had the goal of allowing hardware manufacturers to self-certify their products as open.

Shortly after the launch of the Open Hardware Certification Program, David Freeman announced the Open Hardware Specification Project (OHSpec), another attempt at licensing hardware components whose interfaces are available publicly and of creating an entirely new computing platform as an alternative to proprietary computing systems. In early 1999, Sepehr Kiani, Ryan Vallance and Samir Nayfeh joined efforts to apply the open-source philosophy to machine design applications. Together they established the Open Design Foundation (ODF) as a non-profit corporation and set out to develop an Open Design Definition. However, most of these activities faded out after a few years.

A "Free Hardware" organization, known as FreeIO, was started in the late 1990s by Diehl Martin, who also launched a FreeIO website in early 2000. In the early to mid 2000s, FreeIO was a focus of free/open hardware designs released under the GNU General Public License. The FreeIO project advocated the concept of Free Hardware and proposed four freedoms that such hardware provided to users, based on the similar freedoms provided by free software licenses. The designs gained some notoriety due to Martin's naming scheme in which each free hardware project was given the name of a breakfast food such as Donut, Flapjack, Toast, etc. Martin's projects attracted a variety of hardware and software developers as well as other volunteers. Development of new open hardware designs at FreeIO ended in 2007 when Martin died of pancreatic cancer but the existing designs remain available from the organization's website.

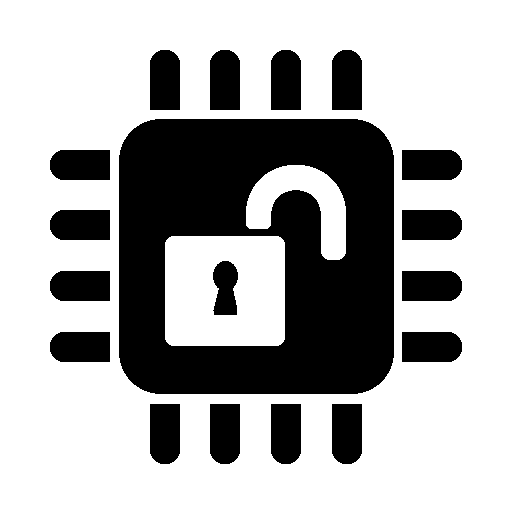
openhardware.org logo (2013)

By the mid 2000s open-source hardware again became a hub of activity due to the emergence of several major open-source hardware projects and companies, such as OpenCores, RepRap (3D printing), Arduino, Adafruit, SparkFun, and Open Source Ecology. In 2007, Perens reactivated the openhardware.org website, but it is currently (February 2025) inactive.

Following the Open Graphics Project, an effort to design, implement, and manufacture a free and open 3D graphics chip set and reference graphics card, Timothy Miller suggested the creation of an organization to safeguard the interests of the Open Graphics Project community. Thus, Patrick McNamara founded the Open Hardware Foundation (OHF) in 2007.

The Tucson Amateur Packet Radio Corporation (TAPR), founded in 1982 as a non-profit organization of amateur radio operators with the goals of supporting R&D efforts in the area of amateur digital communications, created in 2007 the first open hardware license, the TAPR Open Hardware License. The OSI president Eric S. Raymond expressed some concerns about certain aspects of the OHL and decided to not review the license.

Around 2010 in context of the Freedom Defined project, the Open Hardware Definition was created as collaborative work of many and is accepted as of 2016 by dozens of organizations and companies.

In July 2011, CERN (European Organization for Nuclear Research) released an open-source hardware license, CERN OHL. Javier Serrano, an engineer at CERN's Beams Department and the founder of the Open Hardware Repository, explained: "By sharing designs openly, CERN expects to improve the quality of designs through peer review and to guarantee their users – including commercial companies – the freedom to study, modify and manufacture them, leading to better hardware and less duplication of efforts". While initially drafted to address CERN-specific concerns, such as tracing the impact of the organization's research, in its current form it can be used by anyone developing open-source hardware.

Following the 2011 Open Hardware Summit, and after heated debates on licenses and what constitutes open-source hardware, Bruce Perens abandoned the OSHW Definition and the concerted efforts of those involved with it. Openhardware.org, led by Bruce Perens, promotes and identifies practices that meet all the combined requirements of the Open Source Hardware Definition, the Open Source Definition, and the Four Freedoms of the Free Software Foundation Since 2014 openhardware.org is not online and seems to have ceased activity.

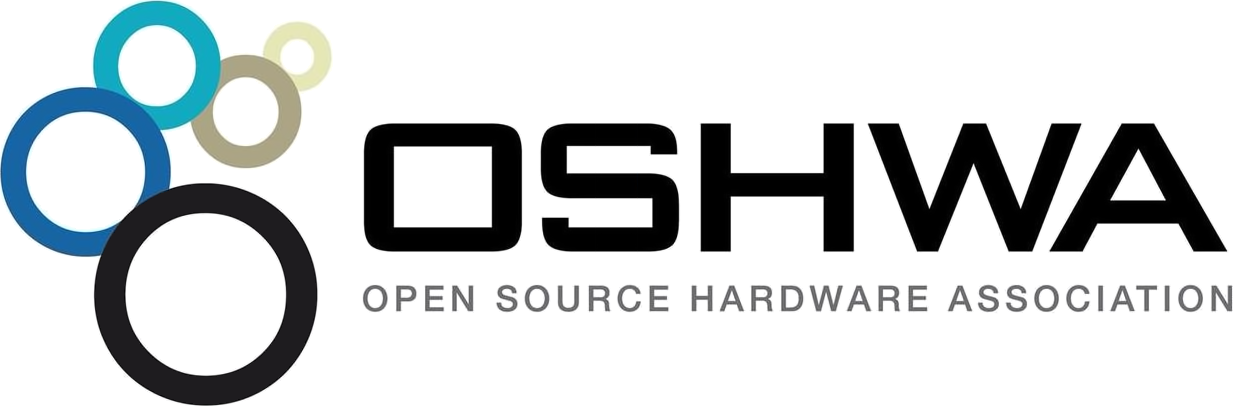
OSHWA logo

The Open Source Hardware Association (OSHWA) at oshwa.org acts as hub of open-source hardware activity of all genres, while cooperating with other entities such as TAPR, CERN, and OSI. The OSHWA was established as an organization in June 2012 in Delaware and filed for tax exemption status in July 2013. After some debates about trademark interferences with the OSI, in 2012 the OSHWA and the OSI signed a co-existence agreement.

The FOSSi Foundation is founded in 2015 as a UK-based non-profit to promote and protect the open source silicon chip movement, roughly a year after the official release of RISC-V architecture.

The Free Software Foundation has suggested an alternative "free hardware" definition derived from the Four Freedoms.

In 2026, to better integrate open hardware into conventional technological development, Open Source Technology Readiness Levels (OSTRLs), were developed. They are a readiness assessment framework for evaluating the openness maturity of technologies to be integrated into open source ecosystems built on top of the traditional Technology Readiness Levels.

== Forms of open-source hardware ==
Explainer video for Open Science Hardware

The term hardware in open-source hardware has been historically used in opposition to the term software of open-source software. That is, to refer to the electronic hardware on which the software runs (see previous section). However, as more and more non-electronic hardware products are made open source (for example WikiHouse, OpenBeam or Hovalin), this term tends to be used back in its broader sense of "physical product". The field of open-source hardware has been shown to go beyond electronic hardware and to cover a larger range of product categories such as machine tools, vehicles and medical equipment. In that sense, hardware refers to any form of tangible product, be it electronic hardware, mechanical hardware, textile or even construction hardware. The Open Source Hardware (OSHW) Definition 1.0 defines hardware as "tangible artifacts — machines, devices, or other physical things".

=== Electronics ===
Electronics is one of the most popular types of open-source hardware. PCB based designs can be published similarly to software as CAD files, which users can send directly to PCB fabrication companies to receive hardware in the mail. Alternatively, users can obtain components and solder them together themselves.

There are many companies that provide large varieties of open-source electronics such as Sparkfun, Adafruit, and Seeed. In addition, there are NPOs and companies that provide a specific open-source electronic component such as the Arduino electronics prototyping platform. There are many examples of specialty open-source electronics such as low-cost voltage and current GMAW open-source 3D printer monitor and a robotics-assisted mass spectrometry assay platform. Open-source electronics finds various uses, including automation of chemical procedures.

=== Chip design ===
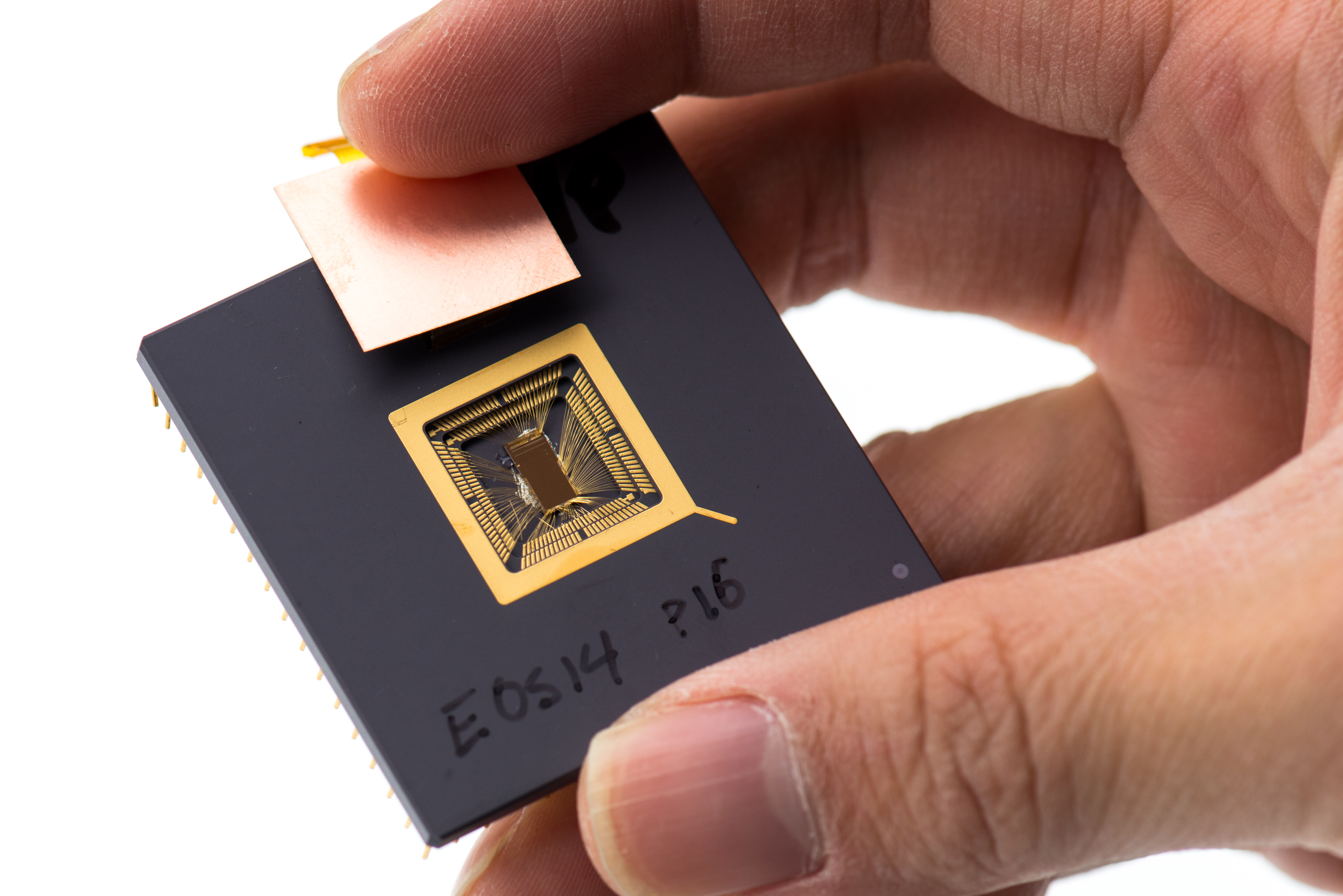
RISC-V processor prototype, January 2013

Open Standard chip designs are now common. OpenRISC (2000 - LGPL / GPL), OpenSparc (2005 - GPLv2), and RISC-V (2010 - Open Standard, free to implement for any purpose, even commercial ), are examples of free to use instruction set architecture.

OpenCores is a large library of standard chip design subcomponents which can be combined into larger designs.

Complete open source software stacks and shuttle fabrication services are now available which can take OSH chip designs from hardware description languages to masks and ASIC fabrication on maker-scale budgets.

=== Mechanics ===
Purely mechanical OSH designs include mechanical components, machine tools, and vehicles. Open Source Ecology is a large project which seeks to develop a complete ecosystem of mechanical tools and components which aim to be able to replicate themselves.

Open-source vehicles have also been developed including bicycles like XYZ Space Frame Vehicles and cars such as the Tabby OSVehicle.

=== Mechatronics ===
Most OSH systems combine elements of electronics and mechanics to form mechatronics systems. A large range of open-source mechatronic products have been developed, including machine tools, musical instruments, and medical equipment.

Examples of open-source machine tools include 3D printers such as RepRap, Prusa, and Ultimaker, 3D printer filament extruders such as polystruder XR PRO as well as the laser cutter Lasersaur.

Examples of open source medical equipment include open-source ventilators, the echostethoscope echOpen (co-founded by Mehdi Benchoufi, Olivier de Fresnoye, Pierre Bourrier and Luc Jonveaux), and a wide range of prosthetic hands listed in the review study by Ten Kate et.al. (e.g. OpenBionics' Prosthetic Hands).

=== Robotics ===
Open source robotics combines open source hardware mechatronics with open source AI and control software. Due to the mixture of hardware and software it serves as a particularly active area for open source ideas to move between them.

=== Other ===
Examples of open-source hardware products can also be found to a lesser extent in construction (Wikihouse), textile (Kit Zéro Kilomètres), and firearms (3D printed firearm, Defense Distributed).

== Licenses ==
Rather than creating a new license, some open-source hardware projects use existing, free and open-source software licenses. These licenses may not accord well with patent law.

Later, several new licenses were proposed, designed to address issues specific to hardware design. In these licenses, many of the fundamental principles expressed in open-source software (OSS) licenses have been "ported" to their counterpart hardware projects. New hardware licenses are often explained as the "hardware equivalent" of a well-known OSS license, such as the GPL, LGPL, or BSD license.

Despite superficial similarities to software licenses, most hardware licenses are fundamentally different: by nature, they typically rely more heavily on patent law than on copyright law, as many hardware designs are not copyrightable. Whereas a copyright license may control the distribution of the source code or design documents, a patent license may control the use and manufacturing of the physical device built from the design documents. This distinction is explicitly mentioned in the preamble of the TAPR Open Hardware License:

"... those who benefit from an OHL design may not bring lawsuits claiming that design infringes their patents or other intellectual property."

— TAPR Open Hardware License

Noteworthy licenses include:

- The TAPR Open Hardware License: drafted by attorney John Ackermann, reviewed by OSS community leaders Bruce Perens and Eric S. Raymond, and discussed by hundreds of volunteers in an open community discussion
- Balloon Open Hardware License: used by all projects in the Balloon Project
- Although originally a software license, OpenCores encourages the LGPL
- Hardware Design Public License: written by Graham Seaman, admin of Opencollector.org
- In March 2011 CERN released the CERN Open Hardware License (OHL) intended for use with the Open Hardware Repository and other projects.
- The Solderpad License is a version of the Apache License version 2.0, amended by lawyer Andrew Katz to render it more appropriate for hardware use.

The Open Source Hardware Association recommends seven licenses which follow their open-source hardware definition. From the general copyleft licenses the GNU General Public License (GPL) and Creative Commons Attribution-ShareAlike license, from the hardware-specific copyleft licenses the CERN Open Hardware License (OHL) and TAPR Open Hardware License (OHL) and from the permissive licenses the FreeBSD license, the MIT license, and the Creative Commons Attribution license. Openhardware.org recommended in 2012 the TAPR Open Hardware License, Creative Commons BY-SA 3.0 and GPL 3.0 license.

Organizations tend to rally around a shared license. For example, OpenCores prefers the LGPL or a Modified BSD License, FreeCores insists on the GPL, Open Hardware Foundation promotes "copyleft or other permissive licenses", the Open Graphics Project uses a variety of licenses, including the MIT license, GPL, and a proprietary license, and the Balloon Project wrote their own license.

== Development ==
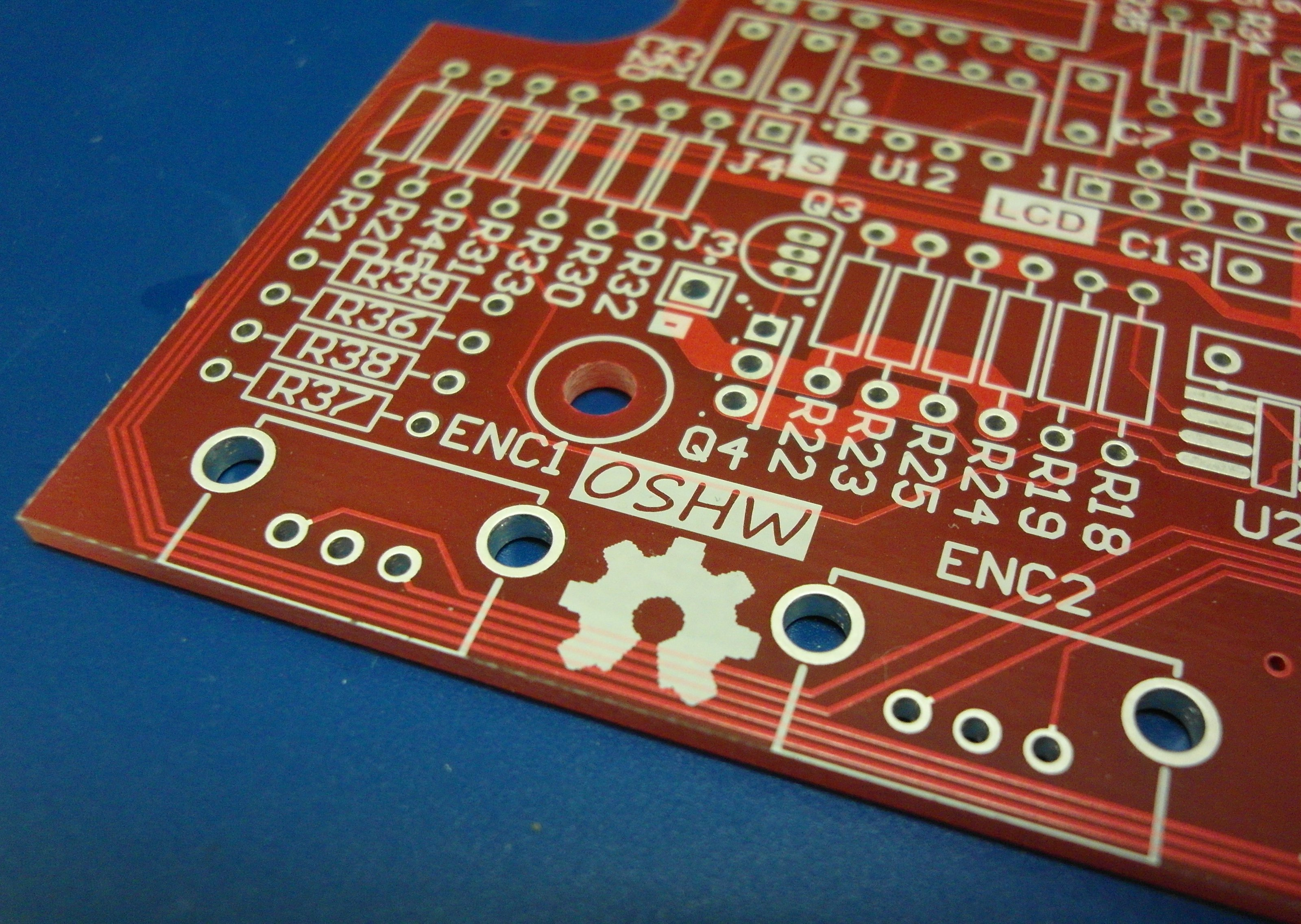
The OSHW (Open Source Hardware) logo silkscreened on an unpopulated PCB

The adjective "open-source" not only refers to a specific set of freedoms applying to a product, but also generally presupposes that the product is the object or the result of a "process that relies on the contributions of geographically dispersed developers via the Internet." In practice however, in both fields of open-source hardware and open-source software, products may either be the result of a development process performed by a closed team in a private setting or by a community in a public environment, the first case being more frequent than the second which is more challenging. Establishing a community-based product development process faces several challenges such as: to find appropriate product data management tools, document not only the product but also the development process itself, accepting losing ubiquitous control over the project, ensure continuity in a context of fickle participation of voluntary project members, among others.

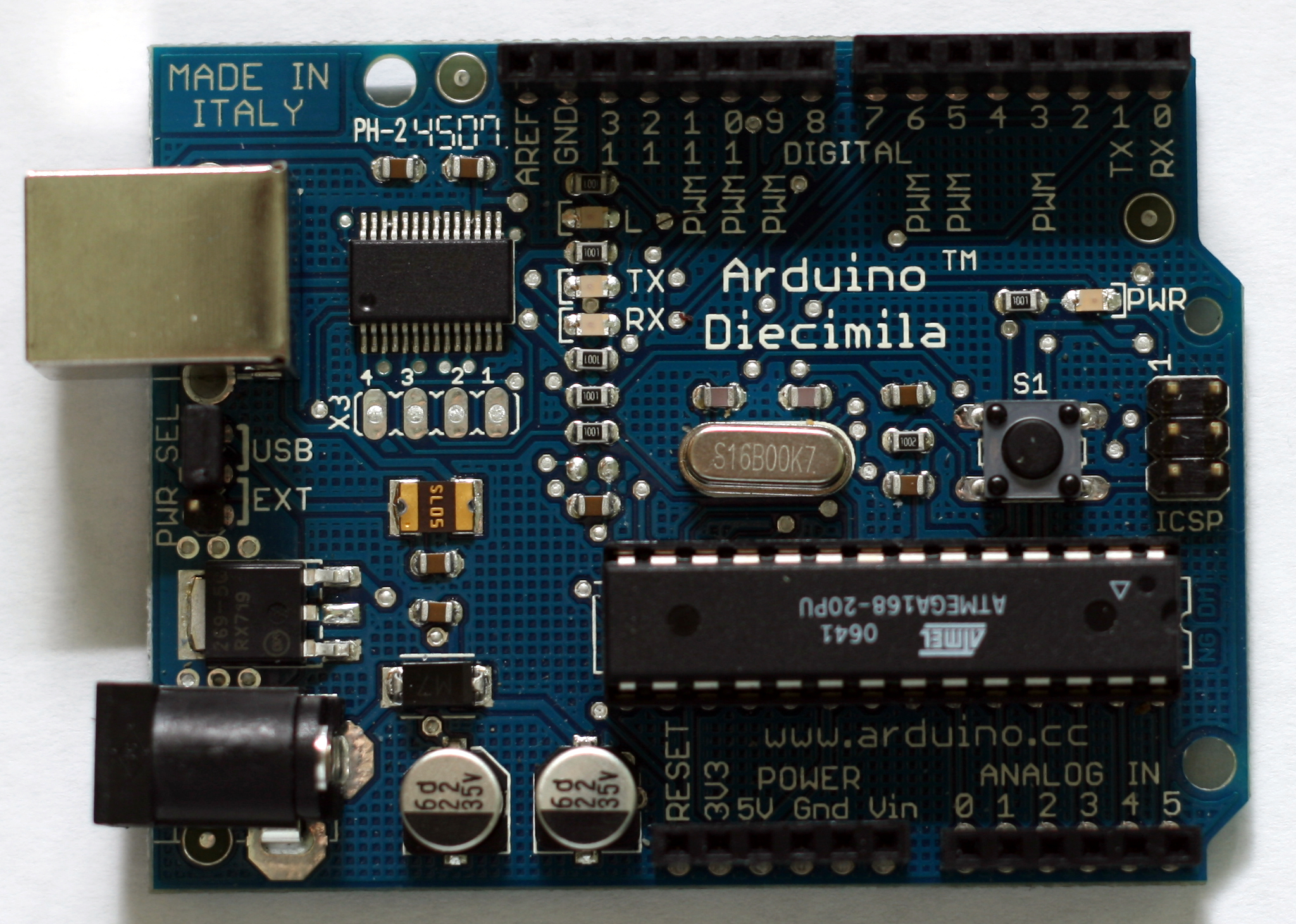
The Arduino Diecimila, another popular and early open source hardware design

One of the major differences between developing open-source software and developing open-source hardware is that hardware results in tangible outputs, which cost money to prototype and manufacture. As a result, the phrase "free as in speech, not as in beer", more-formally known as gratis versus libre, distinguishes between the idea of zero cost and the freedom to use and modify information. While open-source hardware faces challenges in minimizing cost and reducing financial risks for individual project developers, some community members have proposed models to address these needs Given this, there are initiatives to develop sustainable community funding mechanisms, such as the Open Source Hardware Central Bank.

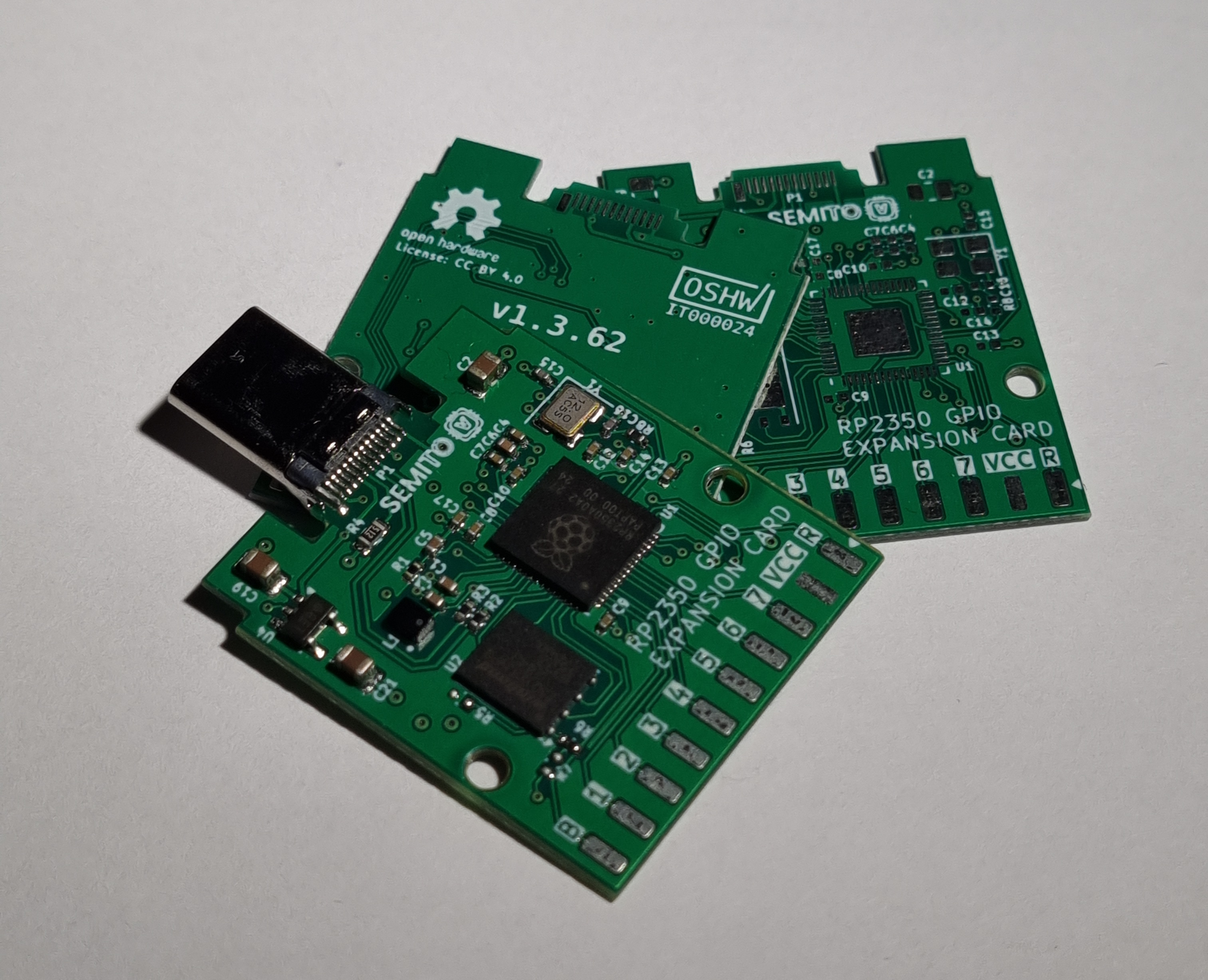
Example of open source hardware: RP2350 GPIO expansion card PCBs for Framework Laptop, source files shared under CC-BY 4.0 license and certified by OSHWA (UID: IT000024)

Extensive discussion has taken place on ways to make open-source hardware as accessible as open-source software. Providing clear and detailed product documentation is an essential factor facilitating product replication and collaboration in hardware development projects. Practical guides have been developed to help practitioners to do so. Another option is to design products so they are easy to replicate, as exemplified in the concept of open-source appropriate technology.

The process of developing open-source hardware in a community-based setting is alternatively called open design, open source development or open source product development. All these terms are examples of the open-source model applicable for the development of any product, including software, hardware, cultural and educational. Does open design and open-source hardware design process involves new design practices, or raises requirements for new tools? is the question of openness really key in OSH?. See here for a delineation of these terms.

A major contributor to the production of open-source hardware product designs is the scientific community. There has been considerable work to produce open-source hardware for scientific hardware using a combination of open-source electronics and 3D printing. Other sources of open-source hardware production are vendors of chips and other electronic components sponsoring contests with the provision that the participants and winners must share their designs. Circuit Cellar magazine organizes some of these contests.

== Open-source labs ==
A guide has been published (Open-Source Lab (book) by Joshua Pearce) on using open-source electronics and 3D printing to make open-source labs. Today, scientists are creating many such labs. Examples include:

- Boston Open Source Science Laboratory, Somerville, Massachusetts
- BYU Open Source Lab, Brigham Young University
- Michigan Tech
- National Tsing Hua University
- OSU Open Source Lab, Oregon State University
- Open Source Research Lab, University of Texas at El Paso

== Business models ==
Open hardware companies are experimenting with business models. For example, littleBits implements open-source business models by making available the circuit designs in each electronics module, in accordance with the CERN Open Hardware License Version 1.2. Another example is Arduino, which registered its name as a trademark; others may manufacture products from Arduino designs but cannot call the products Arduino products. There are many applicable business models, for implementing some open-source hardware even in traditional firms. For example, to accelerate development and technical innovation, the photovoltaic industry has experimented with partnerships, franchises, secondary supplier and completely open-source models.

In science, the majority of open hardware is still funded by federal government funding the same as other science, but because open hardware generally has much lower economic costs it provides a high return on investment for scientific funders. This has resulted in an opportunity for investors to shoulder the risk of conventional funders while earning a return.

Recently, many open-source hardware projects have been funded via crowdfunding on platforms such as Indiegogo, Kickstarter, or Crowd Supply.

== Reception and impact ==
Richard Stallman, the founder of the free software movement, was in 1999 skeptical on the idea and relevance of free hardware (his terminology for what is now known as open-source hardware). In a 2015 article in Wired Magazine, he modified this attitude; he acknowledged the importance of free hardware, but still saw no ethical parallel with free software. Also, Stallman prefers the term free hardware design over open source hardware, a request which is consistent with his earlier rejection of the term open source software (see also Alternative terms for free software).

Other authors, such as Professor Joshua Pearce have argued there is an ethical imperative for open-source hardware – specifically with respect to open-source appropriate technology for sustainable development. In 2014, he also wrote the book Open-Source Lab: How to Build Your Own Hardware and Reduce Research Costs, which details the development of free and open-source hardware primarily for scientists and university faculty. Pearce in partnership with Elsevier introduced a scientific journal HardwareX. It has featured many examples of applications of open-source hardware for scientific purposes.

Further, Vasilis Kostakis et al have argued that open-source hardware may promote values of equity, diversity and sustainability. Open-source hardware initiative transcend traditional dichotomies of global-local, urban-rural, and developed-developing contexts. They may leverage cultural differences, environmental conditions, and local needs/resources, while embracing hyper-connectivity, to foster sustainability and collaboration rather than conflict. However, open-source hardware does face some challenges and contradictions. It must navigate tensions between inclusiveness, standardization, and functionality. Additionally, while open-source hardware may reduce pressure on natural resources and local populations, it still relies on energy- and material-intensive infrastructures, such as the Internet. Despite these complexities, Kostakis et al argue, the open-source hardware framework can serve as a catalyst for connecting and unifying diverse local initiatives under radical narratives, thus inspiring genuine change.

OSH has grown as an academic field through the two journals Journal of Open Hardware (JOH) and HardwareX. These journals compete to publish the best OSH designs, and each define their own requirements for what constitutes acceptable quality of design documents, including specific requirements for build instructions, bill of materials, CAD files, and licences. These requirements are often used by other OSH projects to define how to do an OSH release. These journals also publish papers contributing to the debate about how OSH should be defined and used.

== See also ==
- Computer numeric control (CNC)
- Fab lab
- Hardware backdoor
- List of open-source hardware projects
- List of open-source mobile phones
- NVDLA (NVIDIA Deep Learning Accelerator)
- Open-source robotics
- Open-source architecture
- Open innovation
- Open manufacturing
- Open Source Ecology
- Rapid prototyping
- Reuse
- RISC-V, an open-source computer instruction set architecture
- Simputer
