= Vienna Biennale =

Biennial art exhibition

The Vienna Biennale is a biennial international art exhibition that takes places in Vienna, Austria. It was founded in 2006.

== History ==
The first Vienna Biennale was held in October 2006.

The office of the Chancellary of Austria issued a news release:

Vienna will for the first time host an art biennial festival. The first "Viennabiennale" (ending on 10 October 2006) presents international contemporary art by 80 artistic creators—among them 33 from Austria—at about forty venues. With a small budget, the young team plans to establish a "contemporary network" within the existing art scene.

The Biennale liaised with established galleries, as well as cultural institutes and artists' studios, alongside less conventional locations.

The second Biennale showed a juxtaposition of minimal art and new media art, in collaboration with the Slovenian Cultural Institute and the Italian Cultural Institute. There were also public installations, such as films shown on billboards in the city, with a view to providing more democratic access to the arts.

== See also ==
- Venice Biennale
