= Open Source Hardware Association =

Non-profit organisation

- Abbreviation: OSHWA
- Formation: 2012; 14 years ago
- Founder: Alicia Gibb
- Type: Non-profit organization
- Purpose: Open Hardware advocacy
- Board of directors: https://oshwa.org/team/
- Website: oshwa.org

The Open Source Hardware Association (OSHWA) is a non-profit organization that advocates for open-source hardware. It aims to act as a hub of open source hardware activity of all types while actively cooperating with other initiatives such as the TAPR Open Hardware License, open-source development groups at CERN, and the Open Source Initiative (OSI). It has also been active in promoting diversity and inclusive terminology within the open source hardware movement.

== History ==
The OSHWA was established as an organization in June 2012 by Alicia Gibb, who had been working on the Open Hardware Summit during graduate study. After some debate about trademark with the OSI, in 2012 the OSHWA and the OSI signed a co-existence agreement.

== Open Source Hardware Summit ==
The Open Source Hardware Summit is the annual gathering organized by OSHWA for the open hardware community that takes place at a different location each year. The summit features presentations of projects and developments within the open hardware field from a diverse range of speakers. OSHWA offers the Ada Lovelace Fellowship that covers the costs of the summit to encourage women, LGBTA+ and/or other minorities to actively participate in open technology. The 2024 Open Hardware Summit took place May 3 & 4, 2024 at Concordia University and lespacemaker in Montreal, Canada.

== Open Source Hardware Certificate ==
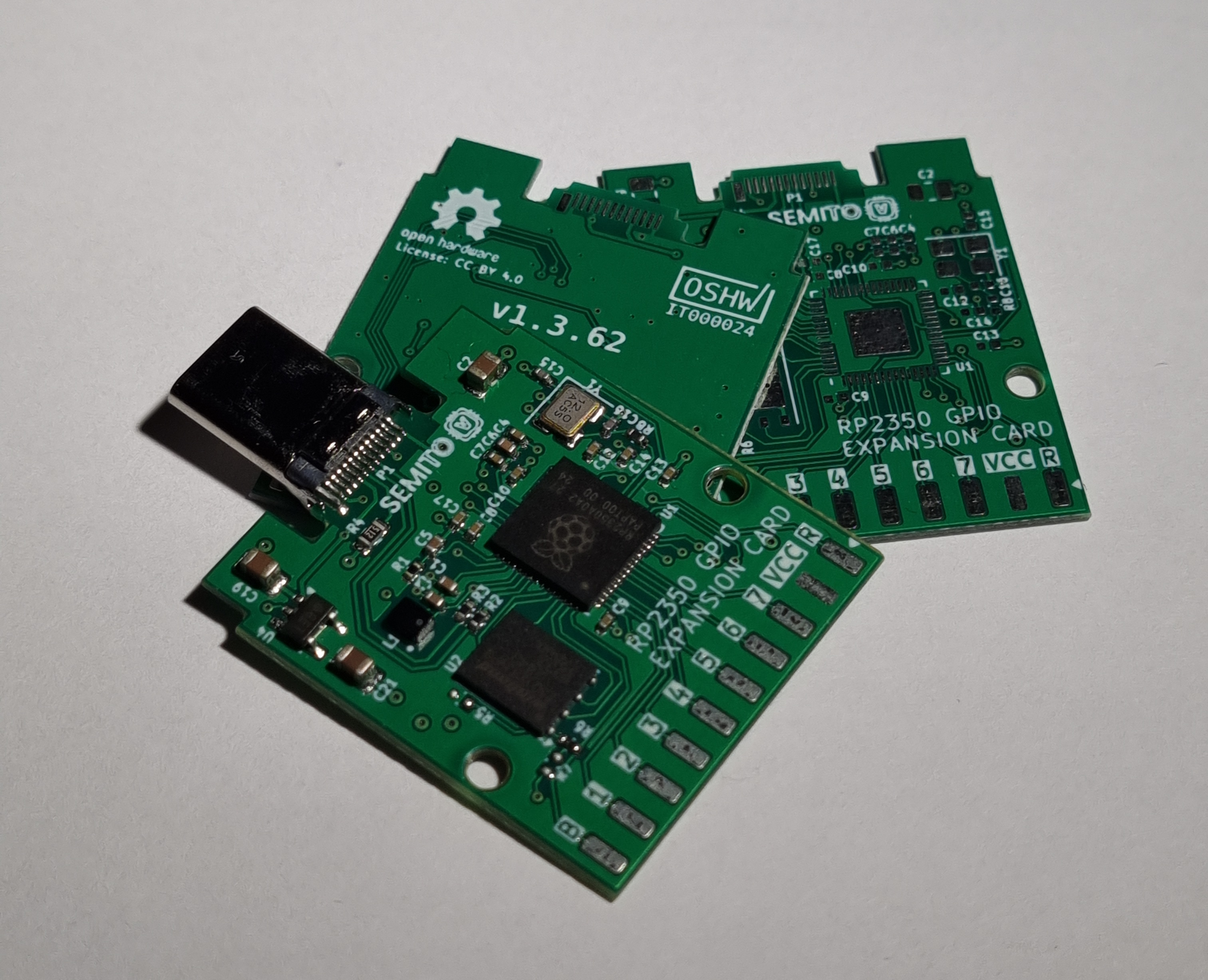
Example of open source hardware: RP2350 GPIO expansion card PCBs for Framework Laptop, source files shared under CC-BY 4.0 license and certified by OSHWA (UID: IT000024)

A sample certification label

In 2016 OSHWA announced its certification program for open-source hardware at the Open Hardware Summit in Portland, Oregon. The certification aims to offer a simple process for producers of open hardware to indicate that their products meet a uniform and well-defined standard for open-source compliance.
