= Patricia Alessandrini =

American composer (born 1970)

- Born: 1970 (age 55–56)
- Occupations: Composer; sound artist; musicologist
- Employer: Stanford University; Goldsmiths, University of London
- Awards: Guggenheim Fellowship (2024)

Academic background
- Education: Bologna Conservatory; Conservatoire de Strasbourg; IRCAM; Princeton University; Queen's University Belfast
- Doctoral advisor: Scott Burnham; Perry R. Cook; Pedro Rebelo; Maarten Van Walstijn
- Musical career
- Genres: Electronic music; sound art

Patricia Alessandrini (born 1970) is an American composer, sound artist, and musicologist. A 2022 Guggenheim Fellow and 2024 MacDowell Fellow, Alessandrini specializes in electronic music and sound art. She is also an academic who specializes in the interdisciplinary study of music and technology, having worked in the faculty of Stanford University and Goldsmiths, University of London.

== Early life and music career ==
Patricia Alessandrini was born in 1970 in the United States. She attended Bologna Conservatory, Conservatoire de Strasbourg, and IRCAM; Ivan Fedele, Tristan Murail, and Thea Musgrave were her composition teachers.

As an artist, Alessandrini specializes in electronic music and sound art, as well as social and political issues and the reexamination of canonical works. She won first prize in the 2009 Sond'Ar-te Electric Ensemble Composition Competition and a 2012 Darmstädter Ferienkurse Förderpreis in composition. She also worked as composer-in-residence at the 2010 soundSCAPE festival, as well as the International Contemporary Ensemble (2012) and the Ensemble intercontemporain (2015-2016).

In 2022, Alessandrini was awarded a Guggenheim Fellowship in Music Composition. In 2023, her album Leçons de ténèbres, performed by Riot Ensemble, was released from Huddersfield Contemporary Records; Arnold Whittall said of that album: "In not providing a more diverse selection of Alessandrini’s many compositions, this album underlines the austere parameters that result from her formidably disciplined manipulation of febrile emotions." In a 2024 review for the Edinburgh Music Review, Simon Barrow praised her piece "Il y a plus d’eau que prévu sur la lune" as "cleverly crafted". She was awarded a MacDowell Fellowship in 2024. She is a 2024-2025 Rieman and Baketel Fellow for Music at the Harvard Radcliffe Institute.

== Academic career ==
Alessandrini obtained her PhD at Princeton University in 2008; her doctoral dissertation Temporal Problematics Raised by Two Metric Versions of Luciano Berio’s Sequenza VII: A Computer-Assisted Analysis and its Implications for Computer-Aided Composition was supervised by Scott Burnham and Perry R. Cook. She later went to Northern Ireland for another PhD at the Sonic Arts Research Centre, with her dissertation Composition as interpretation through performative electronics (2014) being supervised by Pedro Rebelo and Maarten Van Walstijn.

As an academic, Alessandrini researches computer music, digital performance, embodied interaction, and instrument design. She has also worked as an associate professor at Stanford University's Center for Computer Research in Music and Acoustics, as well as a lecturer in sonic arts at Goldsmiths, University of London. Her teaching career also includes technological composition courses at the Accademia Musicale Pescarese and at Bangor University.

== Discography ==
| Title | Year | Details | Ref. |
|---|---|---|---|
| Leçons de ténèbres (as composer; performed by Riot Ensemble) | 2023 | Released: October 27, 2023; Label: Huddersfield Contemporary Records | |
