= TAPR Open Hardware License =

The TAPR Open Hardware License (TAPR OPL) is a license used in open-source hardware projects. It was created by Tucson Amateur Packet Radio (TAPR), an international amateur radio organization. Version 1.0 was published on May 25, 2007.

Like the GNU General Public License, the OHL is designed to guarantee freedom to share and to create, and forbids anyone who receives rights under the OHL to deny any other licensee those same rights to copy, modify, and distribute documentation, and to make, use and distribute products based on that documentation.

== Conditions ==
Although the TAPR OHL aims to maintain the philosophy of open-source software, there are obvious differences in physical reality which require some differences in licenses. As a result, the license defines two conditions: Documentation, as in design information; and Products, the physical products created from them.

== Adoption ==
The TAPR OHL is the license for the materials from the Open Graphics Project as of April 7, 2009. The TAPR OHL is the license for the materials from Lotus Green Data Centers as of July 28, 2008.

== Criticism ==
Former OSI president Eric S. Raymond expressed some concerns about certain aspects of the OHL. He claimed that the license has "lots of problems" and that it "strips the word 'distribution' of its normal meaning, assuring lots of contention over edge cases". There were also concerns that the Open Hardware License may place the design and/or idea into the public domain by publishing it before securing the benefits of patent protection. The OSI did not choose to review the TAPR license.

== See also ==
- Open Hardware License
- Open-source hardware
