= Tucson Amateur Packet Radio =

International amateur radio organization

TAPR is an international amateur radio organization. It was founded in Tucson, Arizona, in 1981 by a group of amateurs interested in developing a terminal node controller (TNC) for amateur use. Thus, the group was named Tucson Amateur Packet Radio, Inc. After developing one of the first widely available TNCs, TAPR rapidly became a national and then international group. It now identifies itself simply by the acronym TAPR rather than the spelled-out name. TAPR no longer has any direct connection with Tucson, Arizona.

Today, TAPR no longer focuses on packet radio, but continues as a research and development oriented group offering kits, assembled products, and publications related to the intersection of amateur radio and digital technology. TAPR describes itself as "A community that provides leadership and resources to radio amateurs for the purpose of advancing the radio art." Current products and development activity relate to software-defined radio, GPS, APRS and time and frequency measurement.

TAPR is a supporter of the HPSDR (High Performance Software-Defined Radio) project which has developed a modular and extensible hardware platform for amateur and experimenter oriented software-defined radio.

Together with the ARRL, TAPR sponsors an annual Digital Communications Conference.

They are the creators of the TAPR Open Hardware License.
