= CERN Open Hardware Licence =

Open-source hardware licence

The CERN Open Hardware Licence (OHL or CERN OHL) is an open-source hardware licence (Note: Contrary to most licence names, the CERN OHL uses the British English spelling licence rather than the American English spelling license which contains an "s".) created by CERN. The licence comes in three variants: strongly reciprocal (Note: CERN OHL authors prefer to use the term "reciprocal" instead of "copyleft" because the underlying rights are not limited to copyright.) (CERN-OHL-S), weakly reciprocal (CERN-OHL-W), and permissive (CERN-OHL-P).

== History ==
The CERN OHL licence was created as an initiative of the members of the Open Hardware Repository, a knowledge-exchange project of electronics designers working in experimental-physics laboratories, founded by CERN engineers, to regulate the use of the designs published by CERN.

=== Version 1 ===
Version 1.0 was published in March 2011. Following community feedback, Version 1.1 was published in July 2011 to follow the generally accepted principles of the free and open-source movements and make it easier for use by entities other than CERN.

Version 1.2, published in September 2013, removed the obligation for licensees that modified a CERN OHL-licensed design to notify upstream licensors about the changes and introduced a notion of "Documentation Location" to guarantee hardware recipients access to the design documents. The license's text ceased to single out Intergovernmental Organizations such as CERN, making them the same as any other licensor or licensee.

=== Version 2 ===
Version 2.0, published in March 2020, simplified the licence's terminology and divided it into three variants: strongly reciprocal (CERN-OHL-S), weakly reciprocal (CERN-OHL-W), and permissive (CERN-OHL-P). The license's range was broadened to include artistic, mechanical, and electronic designs, as well as adapting it to cases such as application-specific integrated circuits, field-programmable gate arrays, and even software.

== Reception ==
The CERN OHL is an accepted free content licence according to the Free Cultural Works definition, and Version 2.0 is approved by the Open Source Initiative.

== Projects using the CERN OHL ==
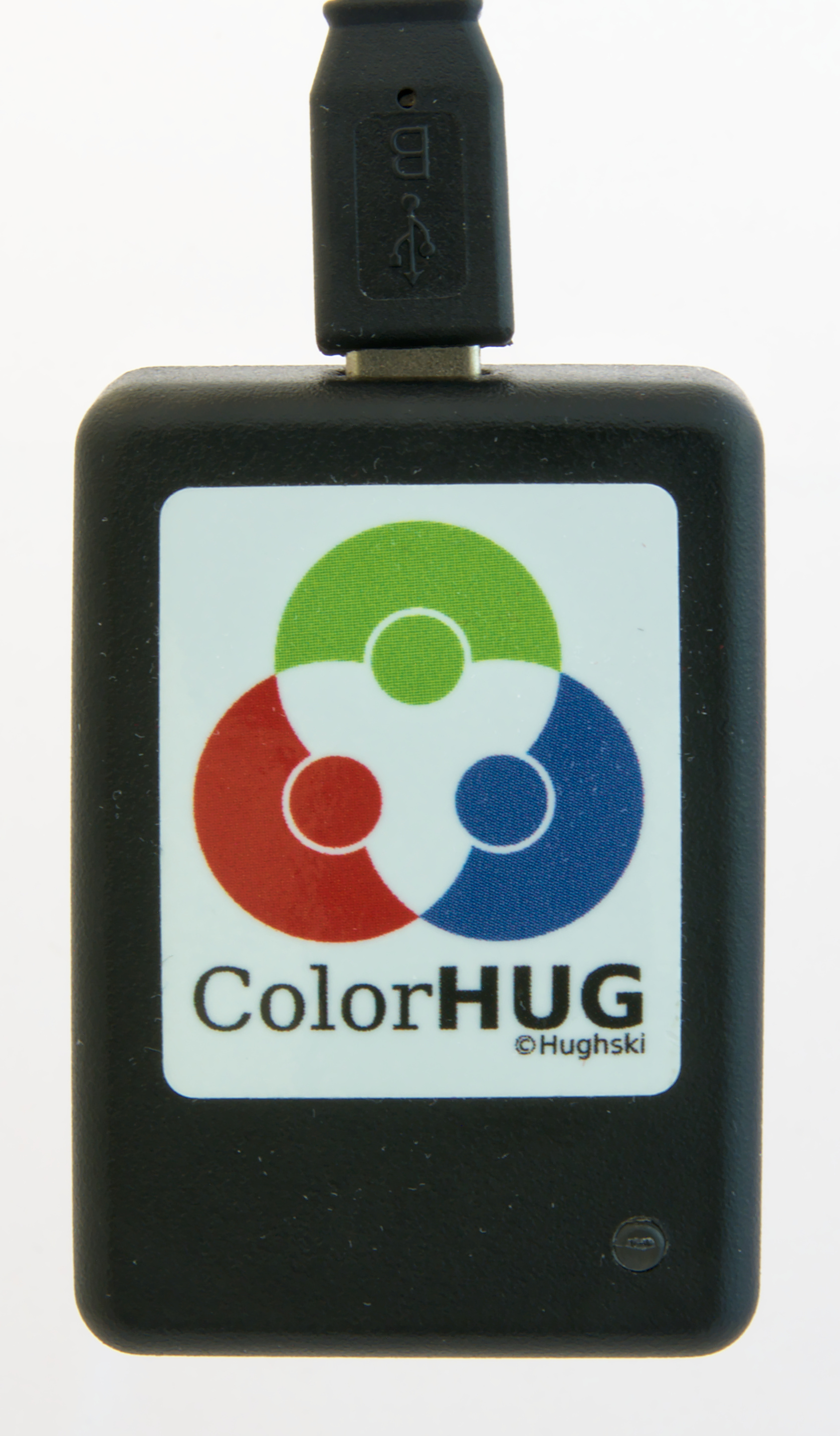
The ColorHug2, an open source colorimeter.

On the CERN OHL website they have a list of projects using their licence. These projects include:

- Most projects in the Open Hardware Repository OHR
- AXIOM – digital cinema camera
- Mechanical Ventilator Milano Rapid production ventilator design as an answer to COVID-19 shortage
- The Monero Hardware Wallet The first (licensed schematic and layout) Monero hardware wallet
- Mycroft Mark I – smart speaker with open-source digital assistant (design files available here)
- ScopeFun open source oscilloscope
- SatNOGS-the open satellite ground station network
- The synchrotron instrumentation PandAbox which chorographs experiments at particle accelerator and other facilities
- Tinkerforge Bricks and Bricklets
- The tristimulus colorimeter Colorhug2 uses version 1.1 of this licence.
- UPSat-the first open hardware satellite 1
- A Free Beer variation, brewed for the RMLL 2012 and recipe placed under the CERN OHL 1.1
- OpenScout an open source hardware mobile robot
- MNT Reform Next an open source hardware laptop
- Mountlet open source server racks, chassis, and accessories

== See also ==
- Open content
