= Cosmopolitan localism =

Social innovation

Cosmopolitan localism or cosmolocalism is a social innovation approach to community development that seeks to link local and global communities through resilient infrastructures that bring production and consumption closer together, building on distributed systems.

The concept of cosmopolitan localism was pioneered by Wolfgang Sachs, a scholar in the field of environment, development, and globalization. Sachs is known as one of the many followers of Ivan Illich and his work has influenced the green and ecological movements. Other prominent cosmolocalism scholars include Ezio Manzini, Vasilis Kostakis and Michel Bauwens.

== Origins ==
Wolfgang Sachs articulated cosmolocalism as an alternative to the notions of cosmopolitanism (as forwarded by Kant) and universalism, which seeks to unify humanity across geographic and cultural boundaries through Western-derived constructs such as human rights and international law. In Sachs' words, cosmopolitan localism:

...seeks to amplify the richness of a place while keeping in mind the rights of a multifaceted world. It cherishes a particular place, yet at the same time knows about the relativity of all places. It results from a broken globalism as well as a broken localism.

In this sense, Sachs framed cosmolocalism as a place-based alternative to universalism, mainly as a critique of the globalization—namely, the subsuming of local cultures and economies into a homogenised and unsustainable global system—while simultaneously avoiding the pitfalls of localization, such as parochialism and isolationism.

Contrary to glocalisation, cosmolocalism moves from locality to universality, acknowledging the local as the locus of social co-existence and emphasizing the potential of global networking beyond capitalist market rules.

Cosmopolitan localism fosters a global network of mutually supportive communities (neighbourhoods, villages, towns, cities and regions) who share and exchange knowledge, ideas, skills, technology, culture and (where socially and ecologically sustainable) resources. The approach seeks to foster a creative, reciprocal relationship between the local and the global. The self-organization of people with access to the fostered global network, collaborate and produce shared resources and their own governance systems.

== Forms of Cosmolocalism ==
=== Small, Local, Open And Connected (SLOC) ===
Italian design and social innovation educator and academic Ezio Manzini describes cosmopolitan localism as having the potential to generate a new sense of place. Manzini also developed the idea of SLOC to describe how communities can thrive in a sustainable and interconnected way. It is closely tied to cosmopolitan localism and emphasizes that places are not isolated, but part of wider networks that balance local richness with global exchange.

With cosmopolitan localism, places are not considered isolated entities, but nodes in short-distance and long-distance networks which globally link local communities in distributed networks of shared exchange, bringing production and consumption closer together. The short-distance networks generate and regenerate the local socio-economic fabric and the long-distance networks connect a particular community to the rest of the world.

=== Design Global, Manufacture Local (DGML) ===
Another form of cosmolocalism is rooted in an emerging productive model that is based on the concept of the digital commons and the motto "design global, manufacture local" (DGML).

This system is built around a commons and entails the social practices of creating and governing a resource through the institutions that a community of producers or users creates and manages. They manifest in various formats, from the co-management of natural resources (e.g., fisheries, pastures) to the co-creation and co-management of digitally shared content. Initiatives such as the free encyclopedia Wikipedia, which has displaced the corporate-organized Encyclopedia Britannica and Microsoft Encarta, and the Apache HTTP Server, the leading software in the web-server market, have exemplified digital commons. The beginning of commons almost exclusively contained digital forms of virtual projects and communities.

DGML falls under the later movements of commons that includes local manufacturing and the entanglement between analog and digital technologies across natural and digital commons, physical and digital spaces, activities, and time.

=== Transition Design and Cosmolocalism ===
Cosmopolitan localism is a topic of focus for transition designers who explore design-led societal transition toward more sustainable futures. It captures the dynamic of dispersed technology initiatives, which exhibit conceptualisations of living, working and making around the commons. Cosmopolitan localism or cosmolocalism has been viewed as a structural framework for organising production by prioritising socio-ecological well-being over corporate profits, over-production and excess consumption. Others have argued that cosmolocalism advances alternatives that could potentially undermine dominant capitalist imaginary significations, attitudes and modalities. It can lead the way for a transition towards a post-capitalist, commons-centric economy and society where value is collectively created and accessible to all. In order for cosmolocalism to become more than a blueprint for a mode of production, the autonomy of local communities and individuals is essential.

However, this autonomy of communities is not political and can be created within the framework of current legislation and political systems of countries, so that states are not afraid of losing control and power over the country, which will hinder the development of communities in this direction. In fact, these communities can be legally registered as a non-profit organizations with the main goal of improving the community and sustainable use of its resources.

== Examples ==
An example of the successful use of open sources within communities is the local production of wind turbines. Based on open technologies that are available on the Internet, local communities in various countries around the world self-organized and assembled wind turbines from scrap materials to power local hospitals, schools or private homes.

For example, in Greece, in a small mountain village, a local community built a wind turbine to provide sustainable energy to the only hospital, since the village is located in a place difficult to access for electrification. In this example, if the state were to solve this problem, then most likely years would pass from the decision to electrify the village in the mountains to the end of the construction of expensive infrastructure, which would cost at least several million dollars. However, self-organization and the principles of cosmolocalism allowed this village to solve its problems within 3–4 months, while the cost of a homemade wind turbine does not exceed a few thousand dollars. This example shows how cost-effective the development of cosmolocalism can be. This will not only significantly reduce unnecessary government spending on expensive projects, but also use natural resources as sustainably and efficiently as possible.

This concept does not completely change the current dominant paradigm of capitalism but is its new form. Paradigm experts such as Carlota Perez argue that capitalism is still the most optimal economic structure of society, but it requires new forms and solutions, such as the transition to subscription-based long-term products with updates, products of the sharing economy, recycled products, etc. This will preserve the concept of free market relations, increasing economic efficiency, but at the same time will affect a more sustainable and efficient use of resources in this new form of capitalism.

The main reason why these concepts are so important is the use of non-renewable resources of the Earth. For example, energy consumption is growing faster than global GDP every year, and given the development of artificial intelligence technologies that require many times more electricity, this trend will noticeably worsen. At the same time, by 2023, renewable energy sources make up no more than 15% of all sources used.

== Critiques ==
Critiques from the Local Futures Movement discussed the techno-solutionist tendency of cosmo-localism and its insufficient criticism of the global techno-economic system. They added that the characterization of "relocalization as an inward-looking movement is false [and] relocalization has historically been internationalist as a movement of change and invested in transnational solidarities."

Michael McCallum offers another critique that emphasized the inclination of cosmolocal discourse to rely on the dualism of socialism and capitalism instead of moving towards genuine pluriversalism and commons-, and conviviality-based practices.

== Interpretations ==
=== Blockchain-based interpretations ===
The concept of cosmolocalism has found its way into what appears to be purely digital contexts, particularly blockchain technology. There, it is interpreted as a framework for combining globally shared digital infrastructures, the blockchain ledgers, with locally embedded forms of production, governance, and coordination. This interpretation has been most prominently articulated by Michel Bauwens, co-founder of P2P Foundation.

Bauwens and collaborators propose that open-source protocols and distributed ledger technologies (DLT) operate as global commons, while governance and implementation is situated with local communities, as close to human need as possible. This reflects the cosmolocal principle of sharing 'light' resources, such as information, software, coordination mechanisms, globally, while keeping 'heavy' activities, including material production, ecological stewardship and social organisation, localised.

This interpretation has informed a range of experimental projects in the blockchain-for-impact space. These include place-based approaches to blockchain adoption like those discussed in the Ethereum localism community. Similarly, ReFi DAO has supported formation of local "ReFi nodes" in multiple regions around the world. These nodes are organised around specific local contexts, such as regenerative agriculture, sustainable forestation, grassroots climate resilience, while being connected through shared discourse and funding mechanisms.

Blockchain-based localism raises concerns regarding its sustainability and ethics. In terms of environmental impact, proof-of-work consensus mechanisms are very energy intensive which might undermine regenerative impact. Most regenerative blockchain projects use Ethereum and adjacent Layer 2 rollup solutions, which rely on the less energy-intensive proof-of-stake mechanism. However, structural centralisation remains a deep concern affecting most blockchains. The infrastructure and governance over what is proposed to be shared globally, is currently concentrated in the hands of early adopters, large token holders, and infrastructure operators. Participation remains unequal across gender, race, class, and technical expertise. Additionally, there are rising concerns about reinforced digital colonialism.

== See also ==
- Commons-based peer production
- Distributed manufacturing
- Localism (politics)
- Open manufacturing
- Open-design movement
- Open-source architecture
- Hackerspace
- Fab Lab
- Subsidiarity
