= Technofeudalism =

Concept in political economics

Technofeudalism is a modern economic system where big technology companies have power similar to feudal lords in the past. Instead of land, these companies control digital platforms, data, and online markets. People and smaller businesses rely on these platforms, just like peasants once relied on feudal lords for land and protection.

== Origins of the idea ==
Technofeudalism sits at the intersection of economics and information technology, cropping up independently within each of the disciplines.

In information technology area Bruce Schneier wrote an article in November 2012 entitled "When It Comes to Security, We're Back to Feudalism", which was published in Wired Magazine, another in December 2012 entitled "Feudal Security", and another "You Have No Control Over Security on the Feudal Internet" for Harvard Business Review in June 2013. Since then the term has entered the vocabulary of sites such as Slashdot.

Within economics the concept of technofeudalism was described in an article by Marina Gorbis of the Institute for the Future in 2010 and has been developed by several thinkers who argue that digital capitalism is shifting toward a new kind of economic control. While the term "technofeudalism" was later popularised by Durand (2020) and Varoufakis (2023), its conceptual roots can be traced to Kostakis and Bauwens, whose Network Society and Future Scenarios for a Collaborative Economy (2014) described "netarchical capitalism" as a "new-feudal form of cognitive capitalism" in which centralised platforms enable user cooperation but appropriate all monetised exchange value, leaving the actual creators of value unrewarded. One of the most well-known voices on this topic is Yanis Varoufakis, an economist and former Greek finance minister. He argues that companies like Google, Amazon, Facebook, and Apple do not simply compete in markets, they own and control them, just like feudal lords controlled land in the Middle Ages.

French philosopher Cédric Durand also explores this idea in his book Technoféodalisme: Critique de l'économie numérique (2020), where he describes how digital platforms extract wealth from users, workers, and businesses without true competition. He claims that today's economy is no longer based on traditional capitalism, where businesses compete, but on a system where a few tech giants rule over digital space.

These thinkers believe that rather than creating a free and open Internet, digital platforms have built a system where power is concentrated in the hands of a few, making it harder for smaller players to succeed.

== Key features ==
Technofeudalism is so called because users of the term perceive similarities between present-day technological systems and medieval feudal systems:

- Control over platforms: Large companies own and manage platforms like social media, e-commerce, and cloud computing, deciding who can participate.
- Dependence on Big Tech: Businesses and workers must follow platform rules to earn money, similar to how peasants depended on lords.
- Data ownership: Tech companies collect and use personal data, which gives them more power over users.
- Limited competition: A few companies dominate entire industries, making it hard for smaller businesses to compete.

== Criticism ==
The concept of technofeudalism has been criticised by scholars who argue that the growing power of technology companies represents a transformation of capitalism rather than its replacement. In a Marxist critique, Evgeny Morozov argues that monopoly power and rent extraction are longstanding features of capitalism, and that feudal analogies risk obscuring capitalist relations of production and the role of the state in the digital economy. Economist Cecilia Rikap similarly examines the dominance of major technology firms through the concept of intellectual monopoly capitalism, focusing on their control over knowledge, data and innovation. Elliot Goodell Ugalde extends this criticism through a monopoly-capital analysis of artificial intelligence investment, drawing on Marxist crisis theory to interpret AI expansion as a mechanism for absorbing surplus capital under conditions of overaccumulation, rather than evidence of a new mode of production.

Other critics question the historical accuracy and explanatory value of the feudal analogy. Sociologist Nicholas Gane argues that technology corporations remain embedded in capitalist economic relations, challenging the claim that capitalism has been displaced by a new feudal system. Political theorist Jeremy Gilbert instead examines platform capitalism as an alternative framework, describing the digital economy as a new regime of capitalist accumulation.

== See also ==
- Gig economy
- Gig worker
- Neo-feudalism
- Platform capitalism
- Platform economy
- Surveillance capitalism
- Technocapitalism
