= Platform cooperative =

Business structure type

A platform cooperative, or platform co-op, is a cooperatively owned, democratically governed business that establishes a two-sided market via a computing platform, website, mobile app or a protocol to facilitate the sale of goods and services. Platform cooperatives are an alternative to venture capital-funded platforms insofar as they are owned and governed by those who depend on them most—workers, users, and other relevant stakeholders.

Platform cooperativism is an intellectual framework and movement which advocates for the global development of platform cooperatives. Its advocates object to the techno-solutionist claim that technology is, by default, the answer to all social problems. Rather, proponents of the movement claim that ethical commitments such as the building of the global commons, support of inventive unions, and promotion of ecological and social sustainability as well as social justice, are necessary to shape an equitable and fair social economy. Platform cooperativism advocates for the coexistence of cooperatively owned business models and traditional, extractive models with the goal of a more diversified digital labor landscape respecting fair working conditions.

Platform cooperativism is not exactly about digital disintermediation, since a co-op, which is a legally constituted moral entity, owns the digital platform. It is different from platform corporations like Uber, in that the governance of the digital platform is democratic. There are some similarities with the peer-to-peer production movement, influenced by Michel Bauwens and Vasilis Kostakis, which advocates for "new kinds of democratic and economic participation" as far as it is concerned with "the free participation of equal partners, engaged in the production of common resources". Economically and institutionally it is more distant from the radically distributed, non-market mechanisms of commons-based peer production promoted by Yochai Benkler., although they share some ethical considerations. Marjorie Kelly's book Owning Our Future contributed the distinction between democratic and extractive ownership design to this discussion.

While platform cooperatives are structured as cooperatives, granting democratic control to workers, customers, users, or other key stakeholders, companies and initiatives that support the ecosystem of the cooperative platform economy are considered a part of the platform cooperativism movement insofar as they attempt to encourage, develop, and sustain its development. It has also been argued that, as the spread of platform cooperativism "will require a different kind of ecosystem—with appropriate forms of finance, law, policy, and culture—to support the development of democratic online enterprises".

== Typology ==
While there is no commonly accepted typology of platform cooperatives, researchers often categorize platform cooperatives by industry. Some potential categories include: transportation, on-demand labor, journalism, music, creative projects, timebank, film, home health care, photography, data cooperatives, marketplaces. Other typologies differentiate platform cooperatives by their governance or ownership structures.

Platform cooperatives are a business model that differs from platform capitalism, prioritizing fairness and sharing over profit motive. On the other hand, platform capitalists, such as Airbnb and Uber, are more traditional multi-sided businesses focusing on profit and returns to investors. These can also be referred to as capitalist platforms, while cooperativist platforms prioritize cooperation and fairness in addition to a profit motive.

Projects like Wikipedia, which rely on unpaid labor of volunteers, can be classified as commons-based peer-production initiatives, which are distinct from platform cooperatives since they don't employ the same institutional framework and governance.

== History ==
The concept developed as part of the traditional struggle between social factions that associate with the left and the right ideologies, the traditional labor vs capital struggle, in the wake of the information age, as the Internet technology introduced the possibility of trans-local participation in economic processes, through digital platforms.

The term "platform cooperativism" was coined by New School professor Trebor Scholz in a 2014 article titled, "Platform Cooperativism vs. the Sharing Economy", in which he criticized popular so-called "sharing economy" (see disambiguation on the Sharing economy page) platforms and called for the creation of democratically controlled cooperative alternatives that "allow workers to exchange their labor without the manipulation of the middleman". Shortly thereafter, journalist Nathan Schneider published an article, "Owning Is the New Sharing", which documented a variety of projects using cooperative models for digitally mediated commerce, as well as online, distributed funding-models which hoped to replace the venture capital model predominant in the technology sector. Both Scholz and Schneider would later credit the work and provocations of other researchers and digital-labor advocates as their inspiration, including, among others, lawyer Janelle Orsi of the Sustainable Economies Law Center, who had "called on technology companies in the so-called "sharing economy" to share ownership and profits with their users", and Amazon Mechanical Turk organizer Kristy Milland who had proposed a worker-owned alternative to the platform at the "Digital Labor: Sweatshops, Picket Lines, Barricades" conference in November 2014.

There are several other precursors to platform cooperativism. In 2012, the Italian cooperative federation Legacoop promulgated a manifesto on the "Cooperative Commons", which called for bringing the lessons of the cooperative movement to control over online data. The same year Mayo Fuster Morell published an article named "horizons of digital commons" in which she pointed to the evolution of commons-based peer production merging with cooperatives and the social economy. The article reflects on an event named Building Digital commons, which took place in October 2011. It was the goal of the event to further connect the cooperative tradition and collaborative production. Other previous similar terms on new forms of cooperativism such as "open cooperativism" and also studies of how the digital environment opens up new possibilities for the cooperative tradition are of relevance to the new term platform cooperativism.

In 2015, Scholz published a primer on platform cooperativism, "Platform Cooperativism: Challenging the Corporate Sharing Economy", which was published in five languages and helped to internationalize the concept. In 2016, he published Uberworked and Underpaid: How Workers Are Disrupting the Digital Economy, which further developed the concept. Together, Scholz and Schneider went on to convene an event on the subject, "Platform Cooperativism. The Internet. Ownership. Democracy", at The New School in November 2015, and edit a book, Ours to Hack and to Own: The Rise of Platform Cooperativism, a New Vision for the Future of Work and a Fairer Internet.

=== Roots in criticism of the sharing economy ===
Proponents of platform cooperativism claim that, by ensuring the financial and social value of a platform circulate among these participants, platform cooperatives will bring about a more equitable and fair digitally mediated economy in contrast with the extractive models of corporate intermediaries.

The concept of platform cooperativism emerged from the discourse surrounding digital labor, popular in the late 2000s and early 2010s, which critiqued the use of digitally mediated labor markets to evade traditional labor protections. Early studies of digital labor, using the theories of Italian Workerists, focused on the "free" or "immaterial" labor performed by users of Web 2.0 platforms (sometimes referred to as "playbor"), while later analyses served to critique the "crowd fleecing" of digital laborers by microtask labor-brokerages such as Amazon Mechanical Turk and Crowdflower.

In 2014, the digital labor discourse shifted to the sharing economy, resulting in an increase in both academic and media attention to the practices and policies of online markets for labor, services, and goods. Researchers and labor advocates argued that platforms such as Uber and TaskRabbit were unfairly classifying full-time workers as independent contractors rather than employees, thus avoiding legally granted labor protections such as minimum-wage laws and the right to join a union with which to engage in collective bargaining, as well as different benefits offered to workers with employee status, including time off, unemployment insurance, and healthcare.

Other research focused on the automated management of the digital workplace by algorithms, without worker recourse. For example, the wage-per-mile by drivers on the Uber platform is controlled moment-to-moment by a surge pricing algorithm, and its drivers can lose their jobs if they fall behind any one of a number of metrics logged by the platform including ride-acceptance percentage (minimum 90%) and customer-rating (4.7 out of 5). Sharing economy workers who complained about this algorithmic management were often ignored, (e.g. a TaskRabbit discussion forum was shut down in response to worker unrest) and sometimes told that, insofar as the platform owners do not employ their contracted labor force, they were not actually being managed by the technology companies behind the platforms on which they worked.

Insofar as platform cooperatives offer worker-owners a more robust degree of control of the platforms they use, the model was seen as offering an ethical alternative to existing sharing economy platforms. As these early critiques of the sharing economy remain relevant, platform cooperatives tend to highlight their efforts to provide their worker-owners with a living wage or a fair share of revenues, benefits, control over the platform's design, and democratic influence over the management of the cooperative business.

== Public policy ==
The platform cooperativism movement has seen a number of global policy proposals and successes.

=== Spain ===
==== Barcelona ====
Barcelona has a long tradition of connecting cooperativism and collaborative production. On 30 October 2011, an event was held to "Promote dialogue between the cooperative tradition and digital commons".

The Social Economy and Consumption Commission of Barcelona City Council in 2015 started a program on platform cooperativism. The program includes the provision of match-funding to support entrepreneurship and "La Communificadora", an entrepreneurship training and support course, among others.

A March 2016 international event by BarCola (node about Collaborative Economy and Commons-Based Peer Production in Barcelona) produced a set of 120 policy proposals for European governments. Integrated as concrete actions for the Municipal Action Plan of the Barcelona City Council, following a consultative online participatory process, as well as aiming at other local authorities in Spain and the Government of Catalonia, the resulting document criticized the organizational rationale of "multinational corporations based in Silicon Valley" which, though similar to collaborative-Commons economic models, "behave in the style of the prevailing globalized capitalist economic model, based on extracting profits through networked collaboration".

That joint statement of public policies for the collaborative economy, which integrates a Commons-oriented vision in such an emerging paradigm, claimed that by privatizing certain aspects of the collaborative Commons model these companies created "severe inequalities and loss of rights". The organization and participants at the event proposed the creation of favorable regulations for truly collaborative economic models, with measures like the funding of an incubator of new projects in the collaborative economy, including platform cooperativism, as well as the reassigning of public spaces for jointly managed working and manufacturing spaces. Embedded in a wider framework of action research for the co-design of public policies, some of these policy proposals have been met with support by members of the Barcelona city government. Outputs from that process have resulted in specific measures like the incubation of new collaborative economy initiatives following a cooperativist model, or the possibility of new funding schemes for civic projects via transparent "match-funding".

=== United States ===
NYC Council Member Brad Lander of Brooklyn's 39th District, founding co-chair of the Council's Progressive Caucus, released a report in 2016 entitled, "Raising the Floor for Workers in the Gig Economy: Tools for NYC & Beyond", which analyzes the contingent work sector in New York City and "presents policy tools for cities seeking to protect gig workers from wage theft and discrimination, provide access to portable benefits, and establish new frameworks for worker organizing". Under his leadership, the NYC Council unanimously passed the "Freelance Isn't Free Act", which provides freelance workers with a right to full and timely payment, along with new tools for enforcement, and amendments to the NYC Human Rights law to clarify that employment protections apply to independent and contingent workers. In his report, NYC Council Member Brad Lander presented platform cooperativism as a model to help laborers in the digital economy.

The US Department of Agriculture appeared to offer its support for the platform cooperativism movement with a feature story in the September/October 2016 issue of its magazine, Rural Cooperatives.

"Rural Americans have been organizing cooperatives to develop countervailing economic power against larger investor-owned corporations for more than a century. This cooperative movement has now moved into the sharing economy that has been developing throughout the country. Wherever investor-owners of software platforms are satisfying the needs of rural asset owners and users, the sharing economy will be welcomed. However, when the need arises, cooperatively-owned software platforms are proving to be a viable alternative."

Furthermore, policy does not necessarily have to be tailor-made for platform cooperatives in order to enable their growth. For example, policy changes adopted for the cooperative agriculture sector in Colorado have now made it a hub for emerging platform cooperatives of all forms, to the extent where Colorado is now often described as the “Delaware of cooperative law.” This is in large part due to the detailed and novel nature of its state legislature on cooperatives broadly, not just platform coops. For example, Limited Cooperative Associations (LCAs) are a more flexible model that have expanded voting rights within the association beyond “members” in the traditional sense, to create a second class of membership for “investor-members,” a position more enticing to capital-holders than traditional membership, embodying a sort of halfway house between the existing dichotomy. Colorado’s Uniform Limited Cooperative Association Act (UCLAA) enables this arrangement to act as a solution to the pervasive “Capital Conundrum” helping to generate the funding needed for platform cooperatives to compete with their traditional counterparts. While some have cautioned against this approach as fundamentally against what coops stand for, even going so far as to label it a “trojan horse” that allows for “coop washing,” it has undeniably led to the growth of the general cooperative movement and has potential to continue to do so for the digital platform iterations of it too.

Another example of broader cooperative-friendly policy that will especially aid platform cooperatives is the City of Berkeley’s Worker Cooperative Revolving Loan Fund. Passed in 2016, the Revolving Loan Fund (RLF) sets aside public funds to offer below-market-rate loans to worker-owned businesses, including those that operate via digital platforms. Although on a different scale, Berkeley’s loan fund echoes how early federal grants (from agencies like DARPA and NASA) injected seed capital into tech research labs at Stanford and UC Berkeley, leading to spin-off companies that formed the backbone of Silicon Valley. The next step is to craft policy that encourages the link between research universities like those, and creating spaces that foster innovation with a cooperative lens, in a similar vein to the uniquely enabling environment Silicon Valley provided the original gig economy.

=== United Kingdom ===
In 2016, Jeremy Corbyn, leader of the Labour Party and the Opposition in the United Kingdom, released a digital democracy manifesto calling for, among other policies, the fostering of "the cooperative ownership of digital platforms for distributing labour and selling services". He proposed that the National Investment Bank, as well as regional banks, would "finance social enterprises whose websites and apps are designed to minimise the costs of connecting producers with consumers in the transport, accommodation, cultural, catering and other important sectors of the British economy".

== Advocacy ==
=== Organizations ===
Platform Cooperativism Consortium (PCC)

The Platform Cooperativism Consortium is a "think-and-do tank" for the platform cooperativism movement based at The New School in New York City. As a "global network of researchers, platform co-ops, independent software developers, artists, designers, lawyers, activists, publishing outlets, and funders", it engages in research, advocacy, education, and technology-based projects. It was launched in November 2016 at the occasion of the "Building the Cooperative Internet" conference.

The Internet of Ownership

Beginning in 2016, The Internet of Ownership was a website that included a global directory of platform cooperatives and a calendar of events concerning the platform cooperativism movement. It was maintained by Nathan Schneider and Devin Balkind. In 2020, the Internet of Ownership directory stopped being maintained and was superseded by the Platform Cooperativism Consortium's directory of platform cooperatives.

=== Campaigns ===
In September 2016, Nathan Schneider wrote the article "Here's my plan to save Twitter: let's buy it" in which he asked "What if users were to band together and buy Twitter for themselves?" Once in users' hands, Schneider suggested, Twitter could be turned into a platform co-op.

== Criticisms of the viability of platform cooperatives ==
=== Dominance of established players ===
Some critics of platform cooperativism claim that platform cooperatives will have trouble challenging established, venture-capital-funded platforms. Nick Srnicek writes that, due to "the monopolistic nature of platforms, the dominance of network effects, and the vast resources behind these companies ... even if all that software would be made open-source, a platform like Facebook would still have the weight of its existing data, network effects, and financial resources to fight off any co-op arrival." Rufus Pollock expresses similar concerns that platform coops will face major challenges reaching adequate scale, particularly given their inability to raise traditional equity capital. In addition, he argues that coops often have slow and inefficient decision-making processes which will hamper them in their ability to compete successfully. Finally, he points out there is the risk that platform coops will go "bad" becoming an exclusive club for their members (for example, a ride-sharing coop might end up controlled only by drivers who then exploit consumers). Evgeny Morozov writes that "Efforts at platform cooperativism are worthwhile; occasionally, they do produce impressive and ethical local projects. There is no reason why a cooperative of drivers in a small town cannot build an app to help them beat Uber locally. But there is also no good reason to believe that this local cooperative can actually build a self-driving car: this requires massive investment and a dedicated infrastructure to harvest and analyze all of the data. One can, of course, also create data ownership cooperatives but it's unlikely they will scale to a point of competing with Google or Amazon."

While this may be true in certain sectors, Arun Sundararajan claims that, "Economic theory suggests that worker cooperatives are more efficient than shareholder corporations when there isn't a great deal of diversity in the levels of contribution across workers, when the level of external competition is low, and when there isn't the need for frequent investments in response to technological change." Using Uber as an example of a dominant platform, he continues: "Cab drivers, after all, offer a more or less uniform service in an industry with a limited amount of competition. Once the technology associated with 'e-hail' is commoditized, the potential for a worker cooperative appears to be in place, since each local market is contestable."

Regardless, the possibility of dominant platforms turning the flows of data they receive from their larger user-bases into market-securing technological innovations remains a challenge. For example, Uber seeks to use the data they currently collect from drivers using their app to automate the taxi industry, thus eliminating the need for their workforce altogether and likely dropping the value of a ride below that on which a human laborer can survive.

=== Difficulty securing early-stage capital ===
Though Sundararajan believes there are markets in which platform cooperatives might thrive, he finds their primary barrier to entry to be the initial securing of funds, especially given their ideological devaluation of the need to generate profits for investor-stakeholders. He does note, however, that a number of alternative fundraising models may pave the way for the widespread market-entry of platform cooperatives. Among those he mentions is Fairshare, a stakeholder model that differentiates between founders, workers, users, and investors, each with distinct voting rights, payouts, and permissions to trade shares on the open market. Other models he mentions include crypto-coin crowdfunding, philanthropic investment, and "provider stock ownership programs" that mimic the traditional joint-ownership form of the "employee stock ownership program".

== See also ==
- Commons-based peer production
- Cooperative
- Sharing economy
- Solidarity economy
- Unionized cooperative
- Workers' self-management
