= Withlocals =

Travel companies of the Netherlands

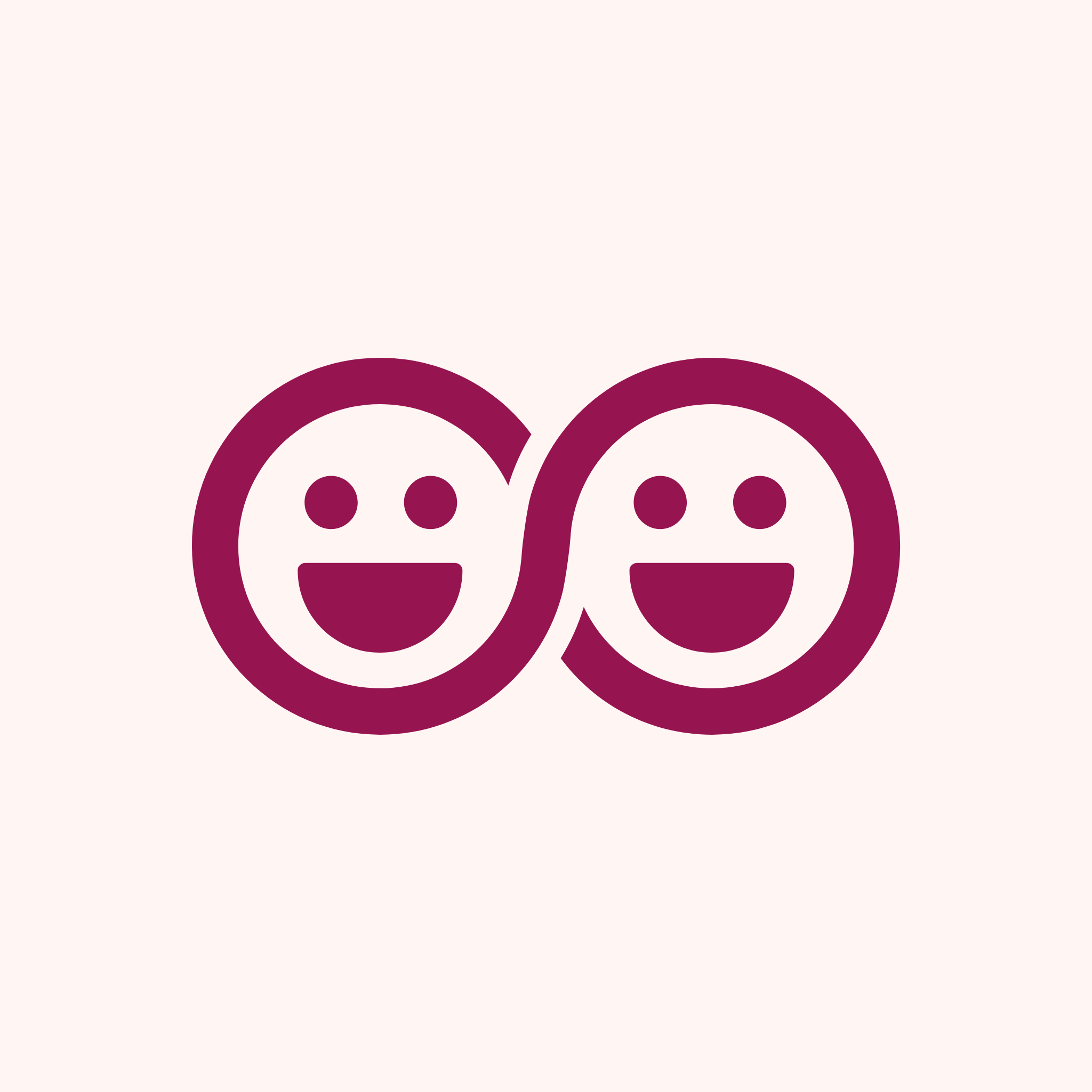
- Company type: Dutch limited liability company (B.V.)
- Industry: sharing economy, tour guide
- Founded: 2013
- Headquarters: Eindhoven, Netherlands
- Key people: Matthijs Keij (CEO); Marijn & Willem Maas (Co-founders)
- Products: Private tours, local travel experiences
- Website: withlocals.com

Withlocals is an experiential travel company that connects travellers to local hosts who offer private, personalised tours. Describing itself as trying to achieve "mass personalisation" rather than offering group or package tours, Withlocals is cited as an example of the role and impact of the sharing economy on tourism – particularly culinary tourism – and the consumer trends for "authenticity" and "experiences".

== History ==
Founded in 2013 by brothers Marijn and Willem Maas in Eindhoven, the Netherlands, the company was supported by startup accelerator Greenhouse group. it obtained $500,000 seed funding from Digital Equity group and a grant from the Horizon 2020 program. It began operations by specifically targeting a market for sharing home cooked dinners across seven countries in Southeast Asia. It later received Series A funding of €3.5 million ($4.3M) in 2017, at which time it reported to offer 1,200 tour options with 900 local hosts in 24 cities – having changed focus to personalised tour guides. In 2019 it secured Series B funding of a further €8 million at which time it was active in 30 cities. Both rounds were supported by Dutch investment company INKEF Capital and the latter by Keen Venture Partners. A priority of the latest round of investment is to improve the Software localisation and range of tours offered in languages other than English. As of mid-2019, Withlocals has more than 50 employees.

== Cities ==
Images from various Withlocals tours

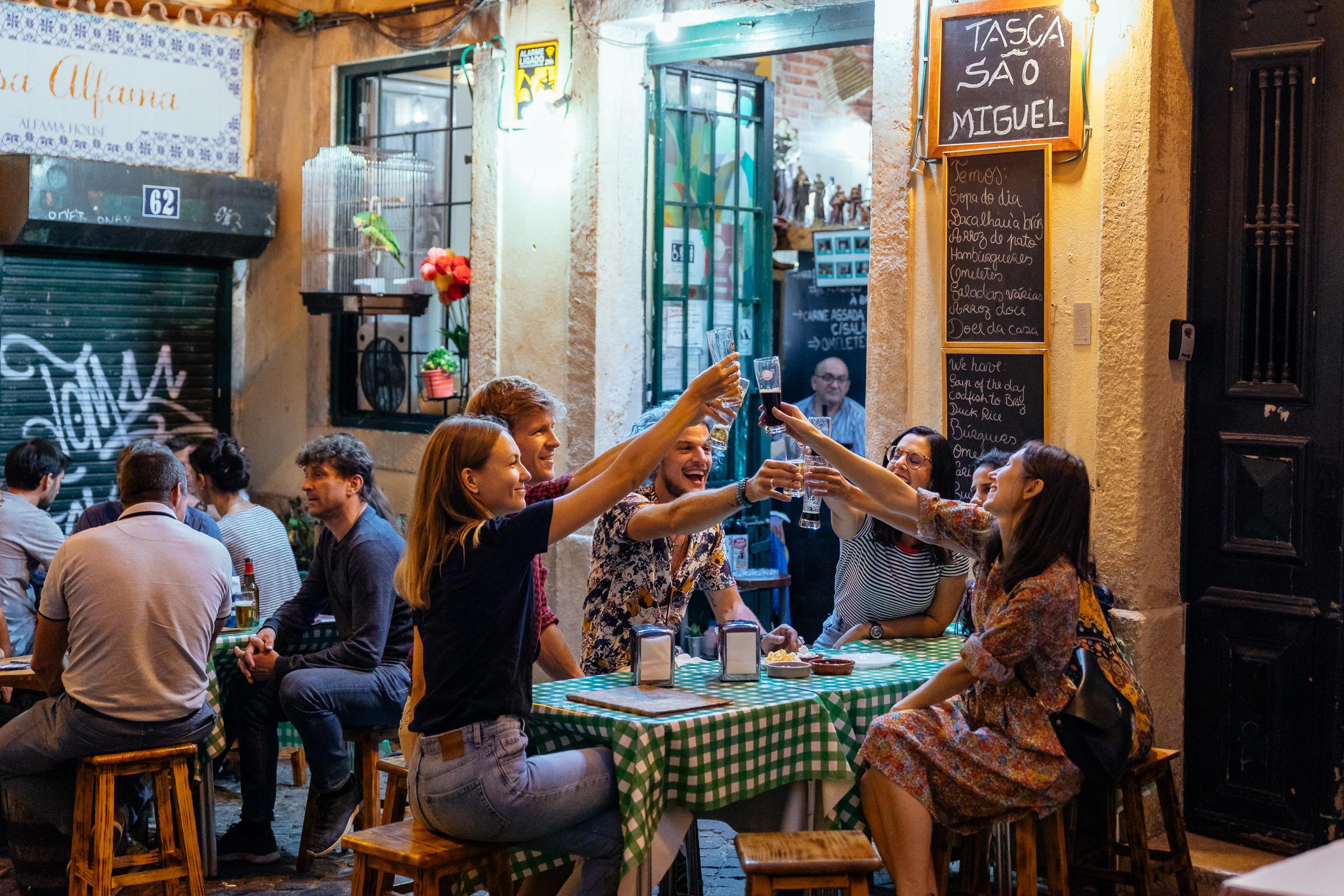
Lisbon

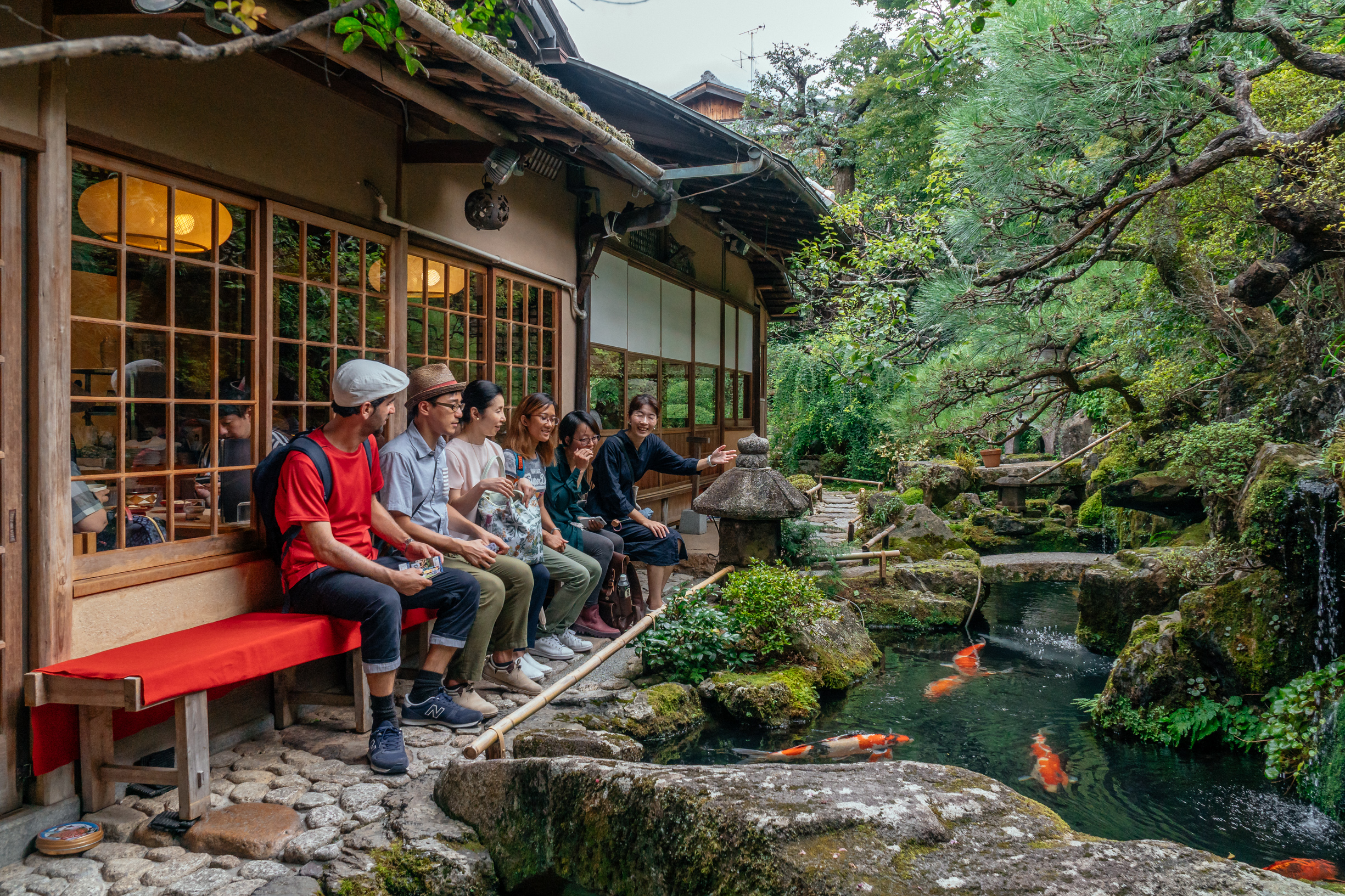
Kyoto

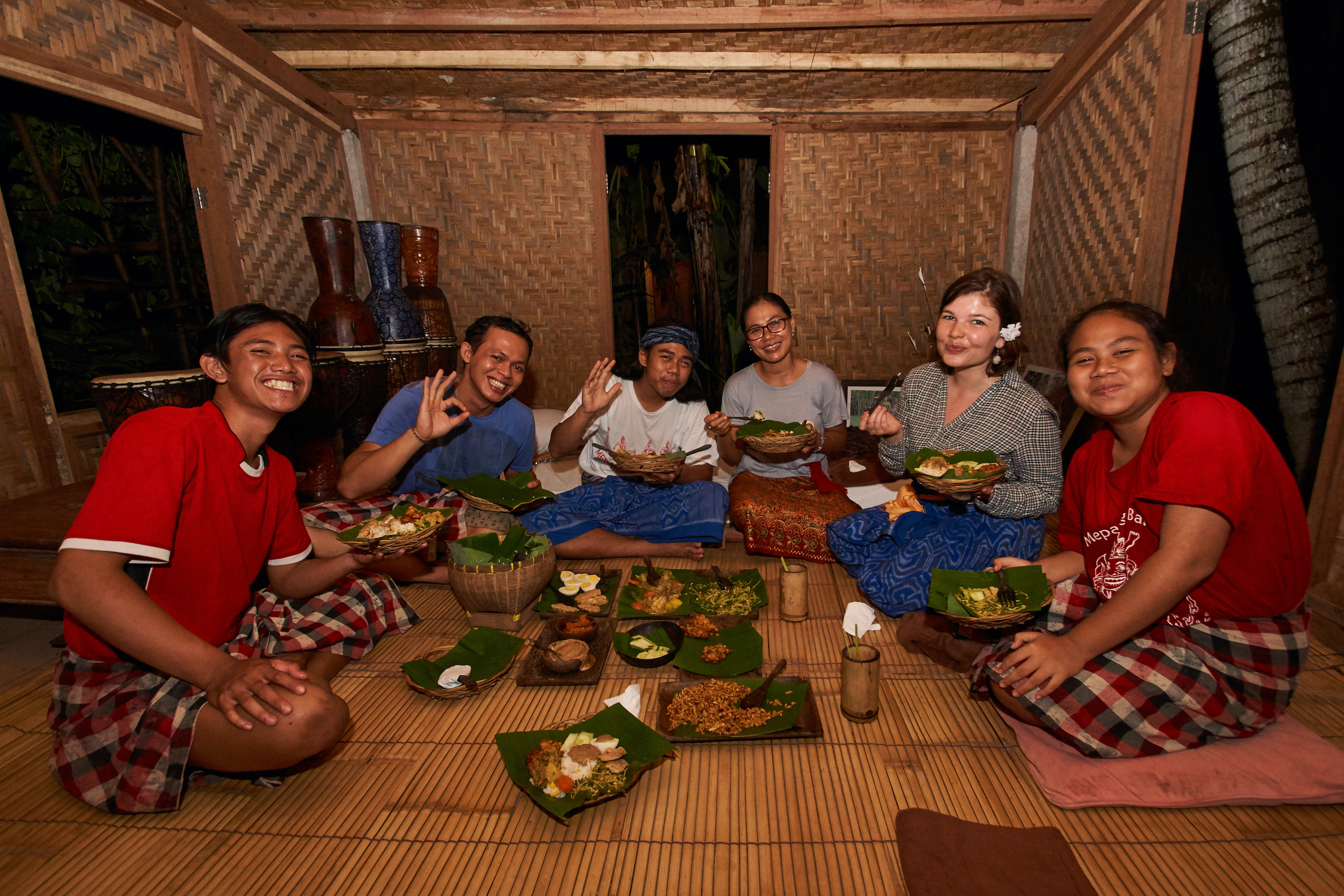
Bali

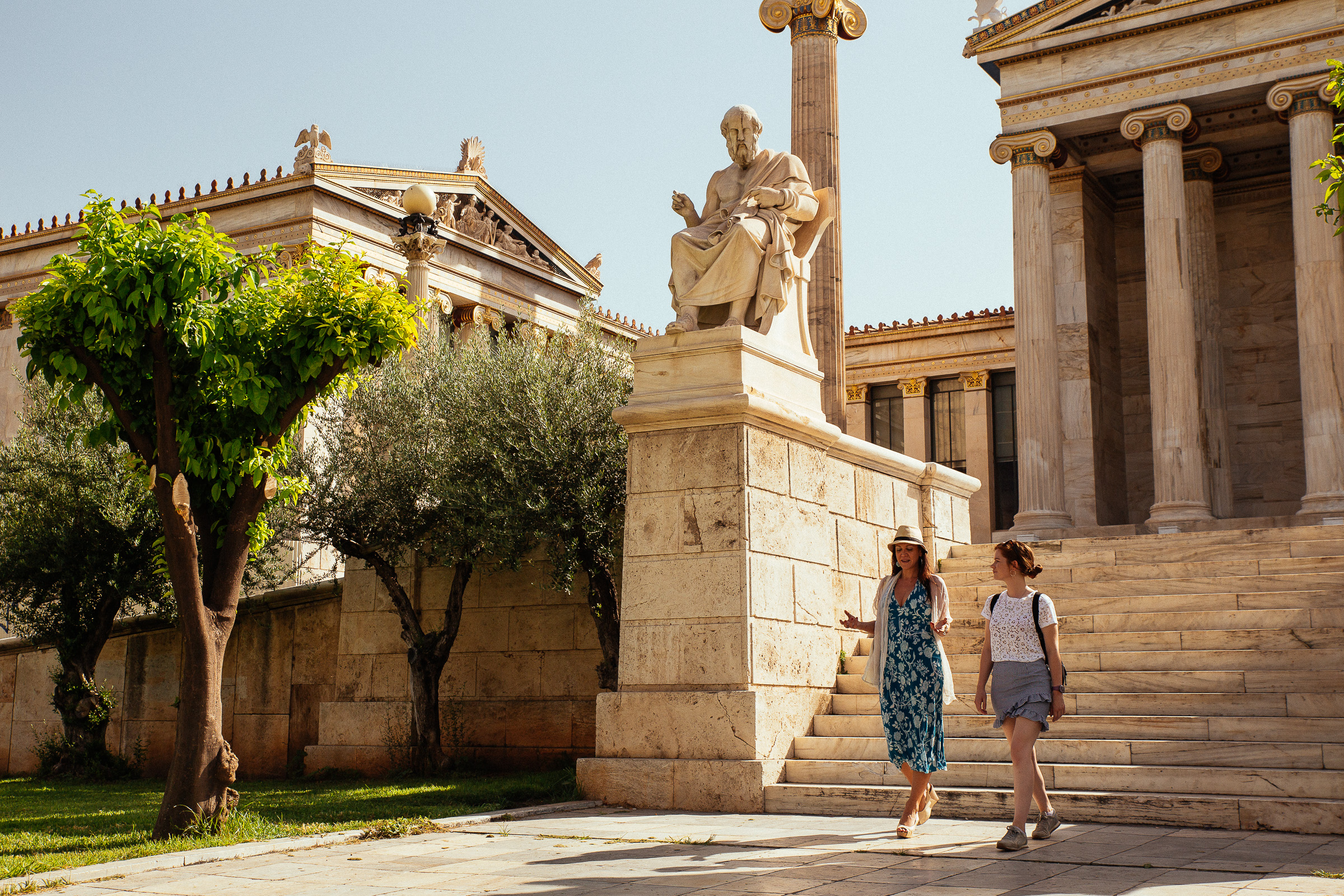
Athens

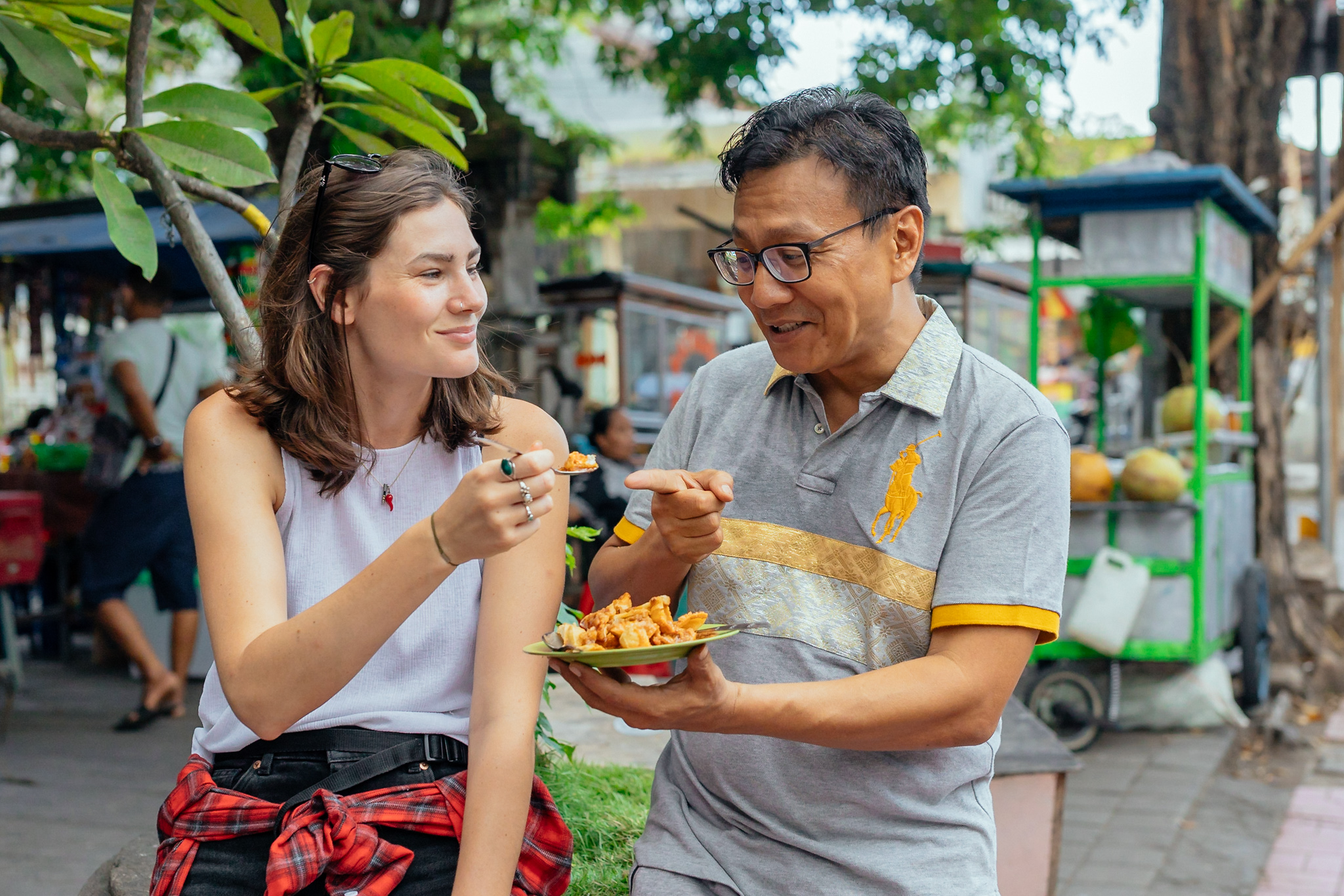
Denpasar

As of mid-2019 the Withlocals platform has hosts offering tours in the following cities:

Africa
- Morocco: Marrakesh
- South Africa: Cape Town

Asia

- Cambodia: Phnom Penh; Siem Reap
- Hong Kong
- India: Kochi; Mumbai
- Indonesia: Bali; Jakarta; Yogyakarta
- Japan: Kyoto
- Malaysia: Kota Kinabalu; Kuala Lumpur; Penang
- Nepal: Bhaktapur; Kathmandu
- Philippines: Cebu; Manila; Palawan
- Singapore
- South Korea: Seoul
- Sri Lanka: Colombo; Galle; Kandy
- Taiwan: Taipei
- Thailand: Bangkok; Chiang Mai; Chiang Rai; Nakhon Sawan
- United Arab Emirates: Abu Dhabi; Dubai
- Vietnam: Hanoi; Ho Chi Minh City; Hội An; Huế; Nha Trang

Australia

- Australia: Melbourne; Perth; Sydney

Europe

- Belgium: Antwerp; Bruges; Brussels
- Croatia: Dubrovnik
- Czech Republic: Prague
- Denmark: Copenhagen
- England: London
- France: Paris
- Germany: Berlin; Munich
- Greece: Athens
- Hungary: Budapest
- Ireland: Dublin
- Italy: Bologna; Florence; Milan; Naples; Palermo; Rome; Venice; Verona
- Poland: Kraków; Warsaw
- Portugal: Lisbon; Porto
- Scotland: Edinburgh
- Spain: Barcelona; Madrid; Palma de Mallorca; Seville; Valencia
- Netherlands: Amsterdam; Eindhoven
- Turkey: Istanbul

North America

- United States: New Orleans; San Francisco
- Mexico: Mexico City

South America

- Argentina: Buenos Aires
- Colombia: Medellín
- Peru: Cusco; Lima
