= I Deliver Parcels in Beijing =

2023 memoir by Hu Anyan

I Deliver Parcels in Beijing (Chinese: 我在北京送快递) is a 2023 nonfiction memoir by Chinese writer Hu Anyan. Expanded from a blog about his work as an internal migrant labourer, the book documents two decades of low-paid jobs within China's gig economy. An English translation by Jack Hargreaves was published by Astra House and Allen Lane in 2025.

== Background ==
Hu worked nineteen jobs in six cities after leaving school, including roles in warehouses, convenience stores, and courier companies. A 2020 online essay about his experiences working for a logistics centre in Foshan attracted editors and led to the creation of a book-length memoir. Following its 2023 publication in China, it became a bestseller with nearly two million copies sold.

== Synopsis ==
The memoir details the demanding conditions of courier and warehouse labour. Hu describes twelve-hour night shifts, unpaid trial periods, extreme heat, surveillance, and the economic pressure to complete a delivery every four minutes to remain profitable.

He recounts deteriorating health, insomnia, and emotional strain. The memoir reflects on the ways platform capitalism shapes workers' identities and behaviour. The book interweaves brief philosophical remarks on freedom, aspiration, and the thin boundary between life and labour for China's internal migrants.

== Themes ==
Critics note the book's portrayal of the precariousness of gig-economy work, internal migration and limited social protections, algorithmic discipline, and psychological alienation under contemporary capitalism.

== Reception ==
In China, the memoir was widely read and received positive coverage, including a favourable notice in the Communist Party–affiliated newspaper People's Daily. Hu received the award of Author of the Year from Douban, a Chinese book review site.

International reviews have been generally positive. The Guardian praised the book's detail but described the prose as "flat". The Financial Times called it "a fascinating insight into China's gig economy", while Asia Times highlighted its "intimate" tone. The New Statesman emphasised its analysis of contemporary labour systems, and The Sunday Times noted its portrayal of limited mobility and dehumanising working conditions. The Economist praised Hu's "straightforward prose and keen eye for detail" in capturing the realities of low-wage work.

== See also ==
- 996 working hour system
