= Brice Le Blevennec =

French serial entrepreneur and author

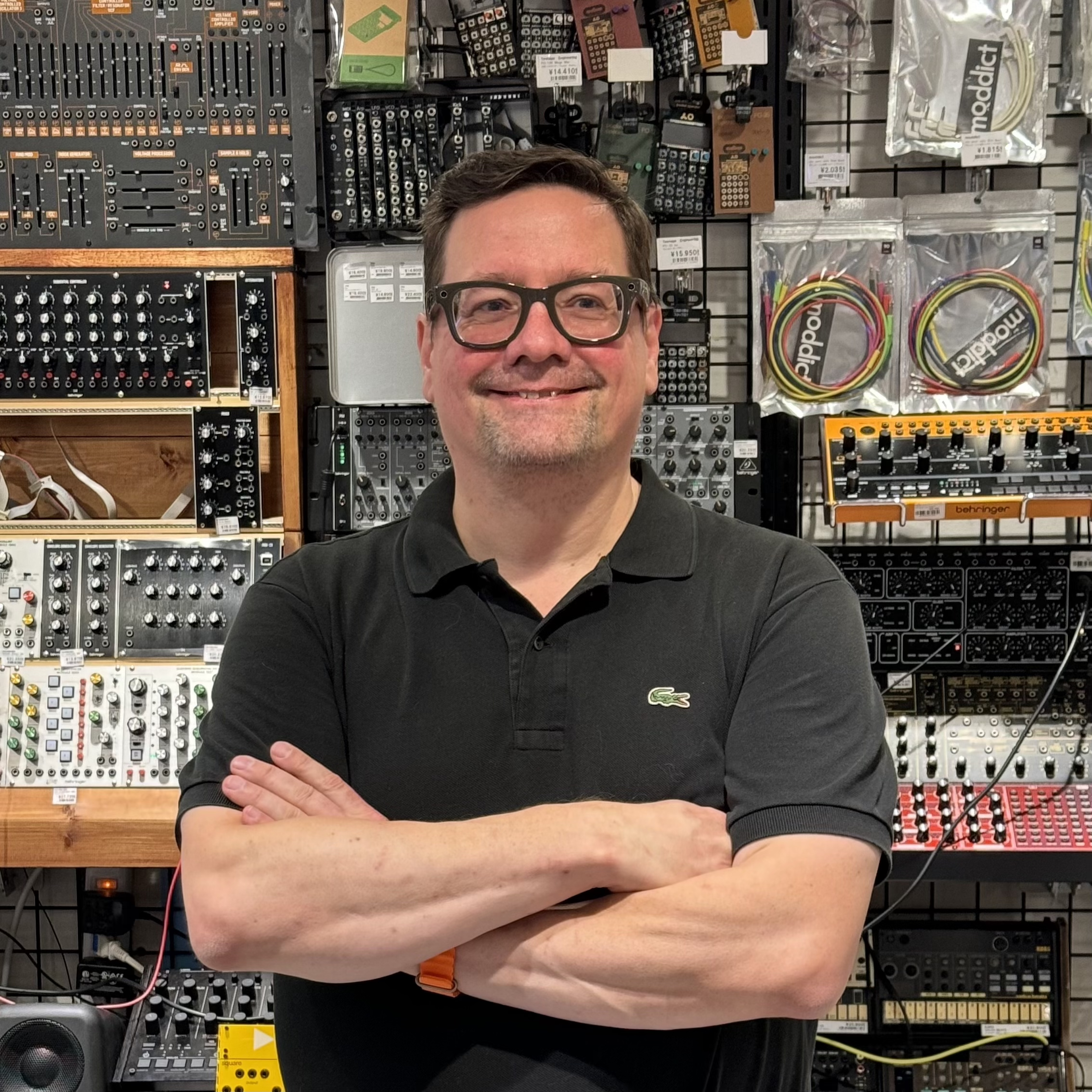
- Occupations: Serial entrepreneur; author

Brice Le Blevennec is a French serial entrepreneur and author.

== Career ==
In 1991, Le Blevennec established Ex Machina, a graphic design and multimedia application development company. One of Ex Machina's initial projects was "Le mystère Magritte" in 1996, a compilation showcasing the artworks of René Magritte. In 1998, Brice Le Blevennec, Patrick De Schutter, and Arnaud Huret founded Mailfence, a private label cloud collaboration suite including messaging, collaboration and mobility technologies. Emakina Group was founded in 2001 through the merger of Ex Machina and Emalaya. Le Blevennec led Emakina Group as chairman and CEO until 2021. He transitioned from CEO to Chief Vision Officer (CVO) at Emakina Group in 2022.

In 2007, Brice Le Blevennec, Gregoire de Streel, Jean Guillaume Zurstrassen, and other investors founded Tunz, an E-Money institution. Tunz was acquired by Ogone in 2012, which was then acquired by Ingenico in 2013.

As a radio personality, he hosted a weekly radio show from 1996 to 2004. The show was so popular that it was adapted into a TV show called CyberCafé, which aired on RTBF.

In 2007, Brice Le Blevennec, Michel Bauwens and James Burke founded the P2P Foundation. In 2011, he co-founded an online dating service Zin.gl, that raised $600,000 from angel investors. Le Blevennec authored the book Visions of a better world, in 2021. It dives into what the future might hold between 2021 and 2051, exploring 30 different themes in 30 articles.

In 2023, Le Blevennec launched Zoetrope, a digital art frame that uses artificial intelligence.
