= Theyer =

Theyer is a surname. Notable people with the surname include:

- Hans Theyer, (1884–1955), Austrian cinematographer
- Hans Heinz Theyer (1910–1961), Austrian cinematographer
- John Theyer, (1597–1673), English royalist lawyer, writer, antiquary and bibliophile

== See also ==
- Thayer (name)
- Theys (surname)
