= Vasilis Kostakis =

Vasilis Kostakis FRSA
- Βασίλης Κωστάκης
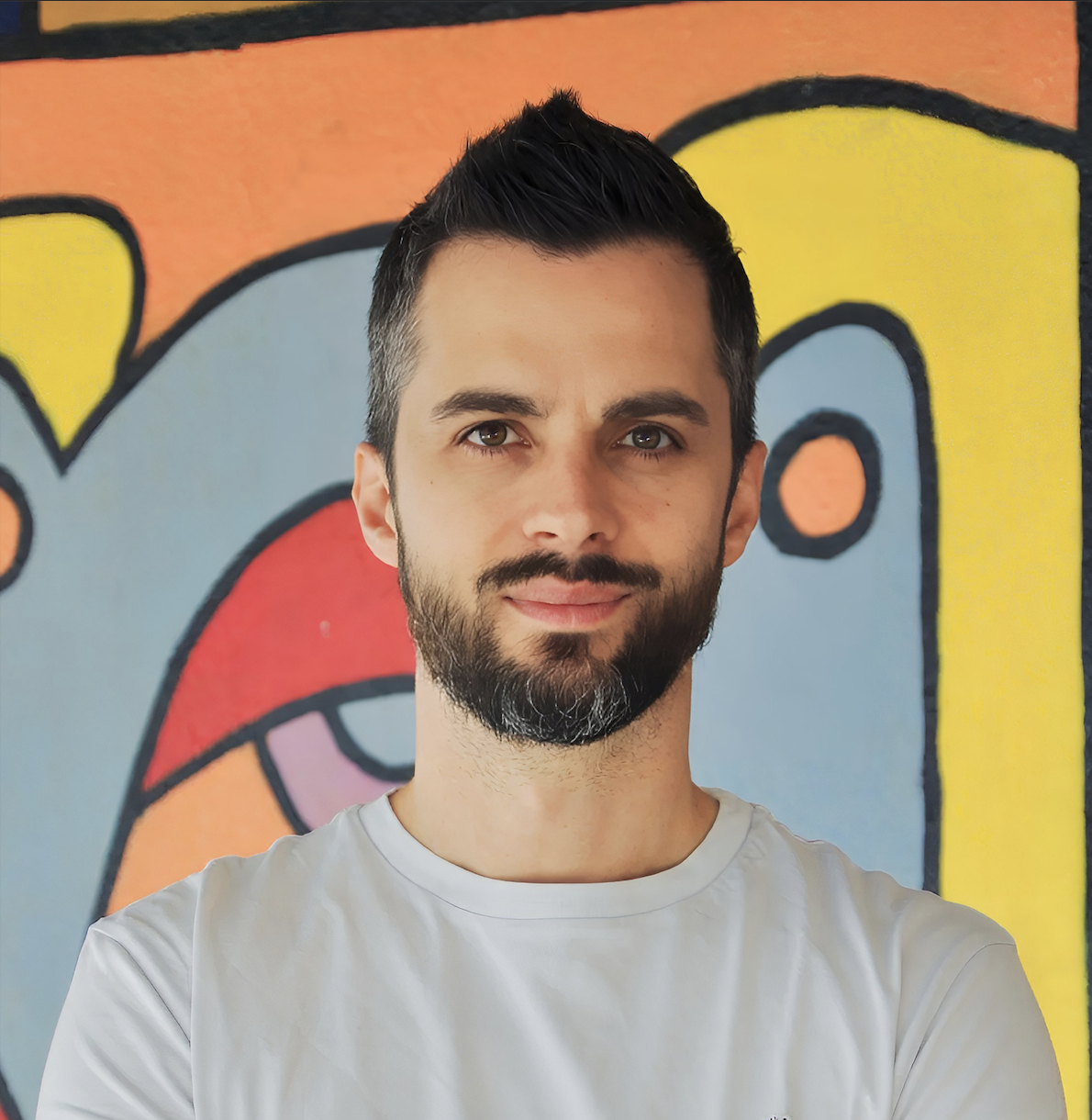
- Born: February 23, 1985 (age 41); Ioannina, Greece
- Education: University of Amsterdam, Tallinn University of Technology, University of Macedonia
- Known for: Research on peer production, the commons, and cosmolocalism
- Awards: Michael Dower Award for Rural Resilience (2025), ERC Grant
- Scientific career
- Fields: Commons, Peer-to-peer, Technology Governance, Post-capitalism
- Workplaces: Tallinn University of Technology, Berkman Klein Center for Internet & Society (Harvard University)
- Doctoral advisor: Wolfgang Drechsler

Vasilis Kostakis (Greek: Βασίλης Κωστάκης; born 23 February 1985) is a Greek academic, researcher, activist and author. He is Professor of Technology Governance and Sustainability at Tallinn University of Technology and a Faculty Associate at Harvard University's Berkman Klein Center for Internet & Society.

His research has contributed to the development of the concepts of technofeudalism, the partner state, platform cooperativism, cosmolocalism, energy commons, and mid-tech, examining how commons-based governance and digital technologies can support socially and environmentally sustainable forms of production.

In 2025, Kostakis received the inaugural Michael Dower Award for Rural Resilience, associated with the European Rural Parliament, for his contributions to the resilience and regeneration of rural communities across Europe.

As an activist, he has been part of the P2P Foundation, the One Laptop per Child, and the Tallinn-based Kopli93 makerspace, among others, and is a founding member of the rural makerspace Tzoumakers, the P2P Lab, the AnotherFootball organisation, and the energy community CommonEn.

== Academic career and research ==
Kostakis studied business administration at the University of Macedonia and the University of Amsterdam. He later completed graduate studies in technology governance at Tallinn University of Technology (TalTech), where he received his PhD in 2011 with a dissertation on the political economy of information production and the partner state approach.

He joined TalTech as a researcher in 2012 and has held a professorship in the Ragnar Nurkse Department of Innovation and Governance since 2018. Since 2017, he has also been a Faculty Associate at Harvard University's Berkman Klein Center for Internet & Society.

His early work introduced the concept of the partner state, later developed with Michel Bauwens as a model in which public institutions enable rather than direct commons-based initiatives. With Bauwens, he also explored alternative trajectories for the network economy, contrasting forms of digital capitalism with commons-oriented production. Their later work introduced the concept of open cooperativism, combining peer production with cooperative ownership and governance.

A major strand of Kostakis's research investigates how globally shared knowledge can support local production. His work on digital fabrication contributed to the development of the principle design global, manufacture local (DGML), in which designs and knowledge are shared globally as commons while manufacturing takes place locally.

This research evolved into the concept of cosmolocalism, which links globally shared knowledge with locally embedded production, sustainability, and community autonomy. Between 2019 and 2023, he led the European Research Council-funded project COSMOLOCALISM, examining the social, economic, technological, and environmental implications of this emerging mode of production.

Kostakis has also contributed to research on the role of technology in degrowth and post-growth societies. His work explores technological approaches that balance functionality, ecological limits, and democratic control. Together with collaborators, he proposed the concept of mid-tech, which seeks to combine the efficiency of advanced technologies with the accessibility, resilience, and community control associated with low-tech approaches. More recent work has extended this framework to open-source technologies, circular economy, and technological justice.

In addition, Kostakis has studied the application of commons-based governance to energy systems. His research examines how decentralized, community-governed energy infrastructures can provide alternatives to both market-driven and centralized models of energy governance.

== Initiatives ==
In 2013, Kostakis founded the P2P Lab in Ioannina, an interdisciplinary research initiative that combines the study of the commons and technology with experimental projects in local communities. He also co-founded Tzoumakers, a rural makerspace in the Tzoumerka region of Greece, and CommonEn, an energy community.

== Public outreach ==
Alongside his academic work, Kostakis has written books, children's books and opinion articles on technology, the commons, artificial intelligence, energy, sustainability, and football. His work has appeared in publications including Harvard Business Review, Aeon, Internet Policy Review, The Conversation, and openDemocracy, as well as in major Greek newspapers and magazines.
