= Nathan Schneider =

American academic and journalist

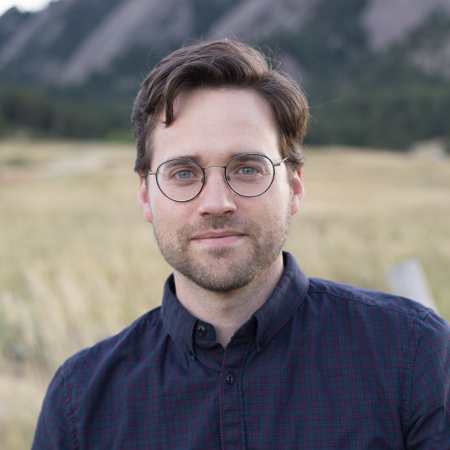
- Born: 1984 (age 41–42)
- Education: Brown University; University of California, Santa Barbara; H-B Woodlawn
- Occupation: professor
- Employer: University of Colorado Boulder, College Of Media, Communications And Information
- Known for: Platform cooperativism, covering Occupy Wall Street
- Website: nathanschneider.info

Nathan Schneider (born 1984) is an American scholar and former journalist, who specializes in economic justice in the online economy. Since 2015, he has been a professor of media studies at the University of Colorado Boulder.

== Writing on religion ==
Much of Schneider's early work concerned the interrelation of religion, science, and politics, which grew out of his academic work in religious studies. He has written investigative articles on the John Templeton Foundation for The Nation and The Chronicle of Higher Education. With the support of a Knight Grant for Reporting on Religion and American Public Life through USC's Annenberg School, he did extensive reporting on the evangelical Christian philosopher and debater William Lane Craig, which resulted in articles that appeared in Commonweal, The Chronicle of Higher Education, and Killing the Buddha.

His first book, God in Proof: The Story of a Search from the Ancients to the Internet is a history of proofs for and against the existence of God, as well as a memoir of his own conversion to Catholicism as a teenager. A starred review in Booklist said, "Schneider makes an often dry subject quite companionable." In Religion Dispatches, Gordon Haber wrote, "Schneider defines the next generation of public intellectuals—fiercely articulate, indefatigably curious and Internet-savvy."

Schneider's writing on religion often deals with neglected traditions of political radicalism. Schneider's profile of literary critic Elaine Scarry for The Chronicle of Higher Education, for instance, compared her scholarship with the religious anti-nuclear movement. In 2014 Al Jazeera America published his story of a Catholic nun with a secret ministry to the transgender community, which was applauded by Buzzfeed and The Advocate.

In 2014, he was named a columnist for America, a national Catholic weekly.

== Coverage of Occupy Wall Street ==
Schneider was among the first journalists to cover the Occupy Wall Street movement during its planning stages and wrote about it for Harper's Magazine, The Nation, The New York Times, and other publications, as well as in his 2013 book Thank You, Anarchy: Notes from the Occupy Apocalypse, published by University of California Press. He claims that his coverage of Occupy Wall Street served as the basis for a scene about Occupy Wall Street in HBO's The Newsroom. Democracy Now! regularly turned to him as a correspondent about the movement, and he also appeared on NPR's The Brian Lehrer Show, Al Jazeera's Inside Story, and an oral history of the movement by Vanity Fair, and Ezra Klein of The Washington Post referred to one of his articles as "the single best place to start" learning about the movement. Interviews with Schneider appear in two of the feature films made about the movement, American Autumn and 99%. Writer Rebecca Solnit wrote the foreword to Thank You, Anarchy, which was adapted into an article for the Los Angeles Times.

Religion continued to feature prominently in how Schneider covered the Occupy movement. According to Nick Pinto of Al Jazeera America, "Schneider's education and much of his writing are concerned with religion, and he relies heavily on Christian vocabulary to describe his experience in Occupy Wall Street." He personally became involved in the movement as an early member of the group Occupy Catholics. An article on the book at Religious Left Law referred to Schneider as "is clearly a brilliant young thinker in the heart of what we might call the revitalization of the religious left."

The cover of Thank You, Anarchy bears a quotation from a New York Observer article—"objective journalism, this is not"—referring not to the book but to the ambiguity of Schneider's role in the movement as a journalist and activist. In a later interview with Malcolm Harris of The New Inquiry, Schneider stated, "I agonized a lot about the participant-reporter thing, probably more than I should have."

== Cooperative economy ==
Following his reporting on Occupy Wall Street, Schneider began to focus on stories related to co-operative economics. For Vice magazine, he wrote the most complete profile to date of Enric Duran, the Catalan activist and fugitive who founded the Catalan Integral Cooperative and Faircoop. For The Nation, he reported on "How Pope Francis Is Reviving Radical Catholic Economics." He also published a number of articles and interviews on emerging cooperative business models for online platforms.

Schneider has been a leading advocate for platform cooperativism. In November 2015, together with New School professor Trebor Scholz, Schneider co-organized a two-day conference billed as "a coming-out party for the cooperative Internet." More than 1,000 people attended, including figures such as legal scholar Yochai Benkler, New York City Council Member Maria del Carmen Arroyo, and Zipcar founder Robin Chase. This led to the publication of a book, which Schneider co-edited with Scholz, Ours to Hack and to Own: The Rise of Platform Cooperativism, a New Vision for the Future of Work and a Fairer Internet, published in 2016 by OR Books.

His book Everything for Everyone: The Radical Tradition that Is Shaping the Next Economy was published in September 2018 by Nation Books. It collects several years of reporting on cooperative enterprise.

== Online governance ==
After becoming a professor of media studies at the University of Colorado Boulder, Schneider studied democratic governance in online spaces. He leads "Media Economies Design Lab", which "experiments with democratic ownership and governance in the online economy" and contributed to building a research group "Metagov" on online governance. His 2024 book Governable Spaces: Democratic Design for Online Life contends that democracy has been hindered by the dominant designs of social media and explores how to enable more democratic practice in daily online life.

In the early 2020s, Schneider used the term "implicit feudalism" to describe the tendency of online communities to have implicit political structures that are more autocratic than democratic in reality, despite appearing to be egalitarian. He argued that this tendency included free and open-source software communities. Schneider listed six common characteristics: an individual or small group holding effective control; "authority deriv[ing] from founders and their appointed successors"; "opacity of policy-making and decision-making processes; blocking of community members' speech; "user exit as the most forceful means of dissent"; and "sole recourse in disputes to platform owners". Schneider argued that these characteristics were the default in typical online communities, citing the Wikipedia and Debian communities as exceptions that "required considerable, intentional effort to counteract the implicit feudalism of their tools' defaults". Together with Seth Frey, Schneider recommended distinguishing discussions in online communities as either "affective voice" (expressing opinions, arguments, emotions) versus "effective voice" - "a form of individual or collective speech that brings about a binding effect according to transparent processes", or in summary, "affective voice is the debate, effective voice is the vote". Using this terminology, Frey and Schneider argued that, as of 2023, affective voice was common in online communities, but effective voice was rare.

== Editorial roles ==
Schneider has served as an editor for two online publications: Waging Nonviolence, "a source for original news and analysis about struggles for justice and peace", and Killing the Buddha, "an online magazine of religion, culture, and politics".

Additionally, he has been an editor-at-large for The Immanent Frame, the online forum of the Social Science Research Council. He is a contributing editor for Religion Dispatches and Yes! magazine.

== Books ==
- Governable Spaces: Democratic Design for Online Life (University of California Press, 2024)
- Everything for Everyone: The Radical Tradition that Is Shaping the Next Economy (Nation Books, 2018)
- Ours to Hack and to Own: The Rise of Platform Cooperativism, a New Vision for the Future of Work and a Fairer Internet, edited with Trebor Scholz (OR Books, 2016)
- Thank You, Anarchy: Notes from the Occupy Apocalypse (University of California Press, September 2013)
- God in Proof: The Story of a Search from the Ancients to the Internet (University of California Press, June 2013)
