= Sharing economy =

Economic and social systems that enable shared access to assets

The sharing economy is a socio-economic system whereby consumers share in the creation, production, distribution, trade and consumption of goods, and services. These systems take a variety of forms, often leveraging information technology and the Internet, particularly digital platforms, to facilitate the distribution, sharing and reuse of excess capacity in goods and services.

It can be facilitated by nonprofit organizations, usually based on the concept of book-lending libraries, in which goods and services are provided for free (or sometimes for a modest subscription) or by commercial entities, in which a company provides a service to customers for profit.

It relies on the will of the users to share and their ability to overcome the fear of the risks of "stranger danger".

It provides benefits, such as lowering the GHG emissions of products by 77%–85%.

== Origins ==
Dariusz Jemielniak and Aleksandra Przegalinska credit Marcus Felson and Joe L. Spaeth's academic article "Community Structure and Collaborative Consumption" published in 1978 with coining the term economy of sharing.

The term "sharing economy" began to appear around the time of the Great Recession, enabling social technologies, and an increasing sense of urgency around global population growth and resource depletion. Lawrence Lessig was possibly first to use the term in 2008, though others claim the origin of the term is unknown.

== Definition and related concepts ==
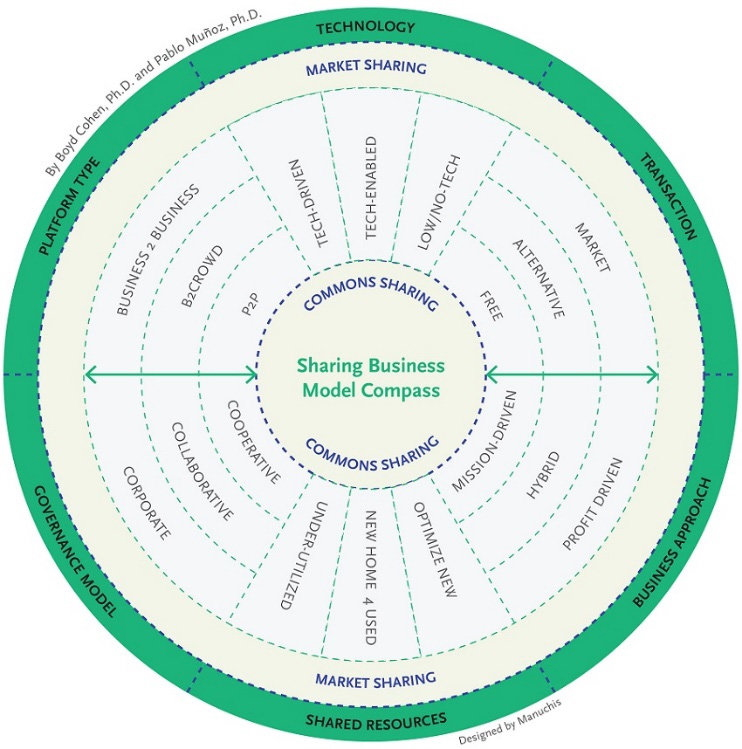
Sharing Business Model Compass (SBMC). Source: Cohen and Muñoz (2016).

There is a conceptual and semantic confusion caused by the many facets of Internet-based sharing leading to discussions regarding the boundaries and the scope of the sharing economy and regarding the definition of the sharing economy. Arun Sundararajan noted in 2016 that he is "unaware of any consensus on a definition of the sharing economy". As of 2015, according to a Pew Research Center survey, only 27% of Americans had heard of the term "sharing economy".

The term "sharing economy" is often used ambiguously and can imply different characteristics. Survey respondents who had heard of the term had divergent views on what it meant, with many thinking it concerned "sharing" in the traditional sense of the term. To this end, the terms "sharing economy" and "collaborative consumption" have often been used interchangeably. Collaborative consumption refers to the activities and behaviors that drive the sharing economy, making the two concepts closely interrelated. A definition published in the Journal of Consumer Behavior in 2015 emphasizes these synergies: "Collaborative consumption takes place in organized systems or networks, in which participants conduct sharing activities in the form of renting, lending, trading, bartering, and swapping of goods, services, transportation solutions, space, or money."

The sharing economy is sometimes understood exclusively as a peer-to-peer phenomenon while at times, it has been framed as a business-to-customer phenomenon. Additionally, the sharing economy can be understood to encompass transactions with a permanent transfer of ownership of a resource, such as a sale, while other times, transactions with a transfer of ownership are considered beyond the boundaries of the sharing economy. One definition of the sharing economy, developed to integrate existing understandings and definitions, based on a systematic review is:

"the sharing economy is an IT-facilitated peer-to-peer model for commercial or non-commercial sharing of underutilized goods and service capacity through an intermediary without transfer of ownership"

The phenomenon has been defined from a legal perspective as "a for-profit, triangular legal structure where two parties (Providers and Users) enter into binding contracts for the provision of goods (partial transfer of the property bundle of rights) or services (ad hoc or casual services) in exchange for monetary payment through an online platform operated by a third party (Platform Operator) with an active role in the definition and development of the legal conditions upon which the goods and services are provided." Under this definition, the "Sharing Economy" is a triangular legal structure with three different legal actors: "1) a Platform Operator which using technology provides aggregation and interactivity to create a legal environment by setting the terms and conditions for all the actors; (2) a User who consumes the good or service on the terms and conditions set by the Platform Operator; and (3) a Provider who provides a good or service also abiding by the Platform Operator's terms and conditions."

While the term "sharing economy" is the term most often used, the sharing economy is also referred to as the access economy, crowd-based capitalism, collaborative economy, community-based economy, gig economy, peer economy, peer-to-peer (P2P) economy, platform economy, renting economy and on-demand economy, though at times some of those terms have been defined as separate if related topics.

The notion of "sharing economy" has often been considered an oxymoron, and a misnomer for actual commercial exchanges. Arnould and Rose proposed to replace the misleading term "sharing" with "mutuality". In an article in Harvard Business Review, authors Giana M. Eckhardt and Fleura Bardhi argue that "sharing economy" is a misnomer, and that the correct term for this activity is access economy. The authors say, "When 'sharing' is market-mediated—when a company is an intermediary between consumers who don't know each other—it is no longer sharing at all. Rather, consumers are paying to access someone else's goods or services." The article states that companies (such as Uber) that understand this, and whose marketing highlights the financial benefits to participants, are successful, while companies (such as Lyft) whose marketing highlights the social benefits of the service are less successful. According to George Ritzer, this trend towards increased consumer input in commercial exchanges refers to the notion of prosumption, which, as such, is not new. Jemielniak and Przegalinska note that the term sharing economy is often used to discuss aspects of the society that do not predominantly relate to the economy, and propose a broader term collaborative society for such phenomena.

The term "platform capitalism" has been proposed by some scholars as more correct than "sharing economy" in discussion of activities of for-profit companies like Uber and Airbnb in the economy sector. Companies that try to focus on fairness and sharing, instead of just profit motive, are much less common, and have been contrastingly described as platform cooperatives (or cooperativist platforms vs capitalist platforms). In turn, projects like Wikipedia, which rely on unpaid labor of volunteers, can be classified as commons-based peer-production initiatives. A related dimension is concerned with whether users are focused on non-profit sharing or maximizing their own profit. Sharing is a model that is adapting to the abundance of resources, whereas for-profit platform capitalism is a model that persists in areas where there is still a scarcity of resources.

Yochai Benkler, one of the earliest proponents of open source software, who studied the tragedy of the commons, which refers to the idea that when people all act solely in our self-interest, they deplete the shared resources they need for their own quality of life, posited that network technology could mitigate this issue through what he called "commons-based peer production", a concept first articulated in 2002. Benkler then extended that analysis to "shareable goods" in Sharing Nicely: On Shareable Goods and the emergence of sharing as a modality of economic production, written in 2004.

== Actors of the sharing economy ==
There are a wide range of actors who participate in the sharing economy. This includes individual users, for-profit enterprises, social enterprise or cooperatives, digital platform companies, local communities, non-profit enterprises and the public sector or the government. Individual users are the actors engaged in sharing goods and resources through "peer-to-peer (P2P) or business-to-peer (B2P) transactions". The for-profit enterprises are those actors who are profit-seekers who buy, sell, lend, rent or trade with the use of digital platforms as means to collaborate with other actors. The social enterprises, sometimes referred to as cooperatives, are mainly "motivated by social or ecological reasons" and seek to empower actors as means of genuine sharing. Digital platforms are technology firms that facilitate the relationship between transacting parties and make profits by charging commissions. The local communities are the players at the local level with varied structures and sharing models where most activities are non-monetized and often carried out to further develop the community. The non-profit enterprises have a purpose of "advancing a mission or purpose" for a greater cause and this is their primary motivation which is genuine sharing of resources. In addition, the public sector or the government can participate in the sharing economy by "using public infrastructures to support or forge partnerships with other actors and to promote innovative forms of sharing".

== Characteristics of the sharing economy ==
1. The sharing economy is made up of three parties: buyers, sellers, and facilitators, all of whom use internet platforms.
2. Buyers and sellers engage directly, unlike models with a real middleman, but the transaction would not have been feasible without the platform that links them. The transaction is made feasible by the platform. But in the end, it is up to the buyer and seller to decide whether to move forward with the transaction and under what conditions.
3. In the sharing economy, short-term peer-to-peer (p2p) transactions are used to encourage cooperation or share the use of underutilized resources and services.
4. In the sharing economy, assets are either rented or shared rather than sold.

== Commercial dimension ==
Geographer Lizzie Richardson describes the sharing economy as a paradox, since it is framed as both capitalist and an alternative to capitalism. A distinction can be made between free sharing, such as genuine sharing, and for-profit sharing, often associated with companies such as Uber, Airbnb, and TaskRabbit. Commercial co-options of the 'sharing economy' encompass a wide range of structures including mostly for-profit, and, to a lesser extent, co-operative structures.

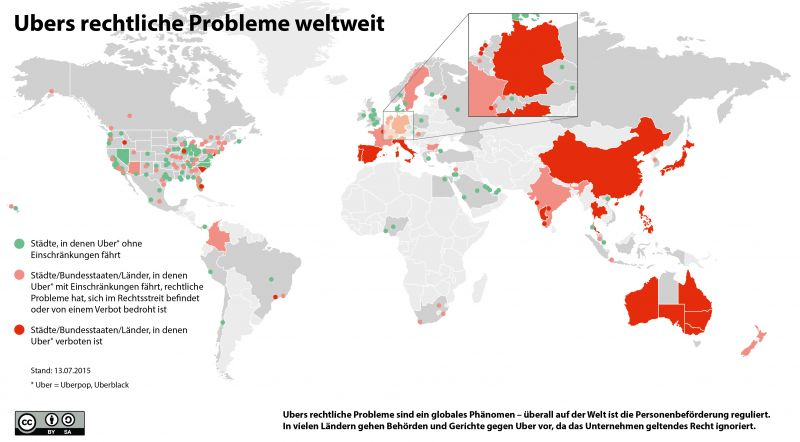
Green marks cities where Uber operates freely, pink where it faces restrictions or legal issues, and red where it is banned.

The usage of the term sharing by for-profit companies has been described as "abuse" and "misuse" of the term, or more precisely, its commodification. In commercial applications, the sharing economy can be considered a marketing strategy more than an actual 'sharing economy' ethos; for example, Airbnb has sometimes been described as a platform for individuals to 'share' extra space in their homes, but in some cases, the space is rented, not shared. Airbnb listings additionally are often owned by property management corporations. This has led to a number of legal challenges, with some jurisdictions ruling, for example, that ride sharing through for-profit services like Uber de facto makes the drivers indistinguishable from regular employees of ride sharing companies.

== Size and growth ==
=== United States ===
According to a report by the United States Department of Commerce in June 2016, quantitative research on the size and growth of the sharing economy remains sparse. Growth estimates can be challenging to evaluate due to different and sometimes unspecified definitions about what sort of activity counts as sharing economy transactions. The report noted a 2014 study by PricewaterhouseCoopers, which looked at five components of the sharing economy: travel, car sharing, finance, staffing and streaming. It found that global spending in these sectors totaled about $15 billion in 2014, which was only about 5% of the total spending in those areas. The report also forecasted a possible increase of "sharing economy" spending in these areas to $335 billion by 2025, which would be about 50% of the total spending in these five areas. A 2015 PricewaterhouseCoopers study found that nearly one-fifth of American consumers partake in some type of sharing economy activity. A 2017 report by Diana Farrell and Fiona Greig suggested that at least in the US, sharing economy growth may have peaked.

=== Europe ===
A February 2018 study ordered by the European Commission and the Directorate-General for Internal Market, Industry, Entrepreneurship and SMEs indicated the level of collaborative economy development between the (then) EU-28 countries across the transport, accommodation, finance and online skills sectors. The size of the collaborative economy relative to the total EU economy was estimated to be €26.5 billion in 2016. Some experts predict that shared economy could add between €160 and €572 billion to the EU economy in the upcoming years.

According to "The Sharing Economy in Europe" from 2022 the sharing economy is spreading rapidly and widely in today's European societies; however, the sharing economy requires more regulation at European level because of increasing problems related to its functioning. The authors also suggest that sometimes the local initiatives, especially when it comes to specific niches, are doing even better than global corporations.

=== China ===
In China, the sharing economy doubled in 2016, reaching 3.45 trillion yuan ($500 billion) in transaction volume, and was expected to grow by 40% per year on average over the next few years, according to the country's State Information Center. In 2017, an estimated 700 million people used sharing economy platforms. According to a report from State Information Center of China, in 2022 sharing economy is still growing and reached about 3.83 trillion yuan (US$555 billion). The report also includes an overview of 7 main sectors of China's sharing economy: domestic services, production capacity, knowledge, and skills, shared transportation, shared healthcare, co-working space, and shared accommodation.

In most sharing-economy platforms in China the user profiles connected to WeChat or Alipay which require real name and identification, which ensures that service abuse is minimised. This fact contributes to an increase in interest for shared healthcare services.

=== Russia ===
The National Digital Economy Program is an important prerequisite for the establishment of a sharing economy in Russia. The population's digital literacy is expanding, and an increasing percentage of consumers are comfortable utilizing Internet applications. Digital has become an essential component of the learning process in schools, universities, and self-study. The TIAR Center estimates that the number of transactions on Russia's main sharing economy platforms reached 511 billion rubles (about $7.6 billion) in 2018, a 30% increase over 2017. The majority of the revenue came from the selling of products through C2C websites.

Avito and Yula are Russia's primary C2C systems. People primarily utilize such sites to sell tangible new or used products to other persons. In 2019, the number of sellers in this market in Russia was 13.8 million, with 11.8 million customers. The average purchase receipt was 3210 rubles (about $48), excluding transactions of real estate and vehicles. Avito debuted in 2007 and has since placed around 51 million advertising in a variety of categories, including real estate, employment, vehicles, and services. Simultaneously, the share of items is represented by 31 million advertising, roughly 60% of all ads posted on the site. Yula, an ad business developed by Mail.ru Group in 2015, has 27 million visits each month. Furthermore, Yula's ad growth rates outpace those of Avito. The number of dealers of such things in small cities is steadily increasing.

=== Japan ===
According to Sharing Economy Association of Japan, The market size of the sharing economy in Japan in 2021 was 2.4 trillion yen. It is expected to expand up to 14.2799 trillion yen in FY2030.

Overall the Japanese environment is not well suited for the development of a sharing economy. Industries do not seek new revolutionary solutions and some services are banned. For example, for ride-hailing services, Uber is not very popular in Japan as the public transport is very sufficient and the regulations ban from operating private car-sharing services and taxi apps are much more popular. According to The Japan Times (2024) it is possible that car-sharing services will be available in the future, however only in certain areas when taxis are deemed in short supply.

== Economic effects ==
The impacts of the access economy in terms of costs, wages and employment are not easily measured and appear to be growing. Various estimates indicate that 30%–40% of the U.S. workforce is self-employed, part-time, temporary or freelancers. However, the exact percentage of those performing short-term tasks or projects found via technology platforms was not effectively measured as of 2015 by government sources. In the U.S., one private industry survey placed the number of "full-time independent workers" at 17.8 million in 2015, roughly the same as 2014. Another survey estimated the number of workers who do at least some freelance work at 53.7 million in 2015, roughly 34% of the workforce and up slightly from 2014.

Economists Lawrence F. Katz and Alan B. Krueger wrote in March 2016 that there is a trend towards more workers in alternative (part-time or contract) work arrangements rather than full-time; the percentage of workers in such arrangements rose from 10.1% in 2005 to 15.8% in late 2015. Katz and Krueger defined alternative work arrangements as "temporary help agency workers, on-call workers, contract company workers, and independent contractors or free-lancers". They also estimated that approximately 0.5% of all workers identify customers through an online intermediary; this was consistent with two other studies that estimated the amount at 0.4% and 0.6%.

At the individual transaction level, the removal of a higher overhead business intermediary (say a taxi company) with a lower cost technology platform helps reduce the cost of the transaction for the customer while also providing an opportunity for additional suppliers to compete for the business, further reducing costs. Consumers can then spend more on other goods and services, stimulating demand and production in other parts of the economy. Classical economics argues that innovation that lowers the cost of goods and services represents a net economic benefit overall. However, like many new technologies and business innovations, this trend is disruptive to existing business models and presents challenges for governments and regulators.

For example, should the companies providing the technology platform be liable for the actions of the suppliers in their network? Should persons in their network be treated as employees, receiving benefits such as healthcare and retirement plans? If consumers tend to be higher income persons while the suppliers are lower-income persons, will the lower cost of the services (and therefore lower compensation of the suppliers) worsen income inequality? These are among the many questions the on-demand economy presents.

=== Cost management and budgeting by providers ===
Using a personal car to transport passengers or deliveries requires payment, or sufferance, of costs for fees deducted by the dispatching company, fuel, wear and tear, depreciation, interest, taxes, as well as adequate insurance. The driver is typically not paid for driving to an area where fares might be found in the volume necessary for high earnings, or driving to the location of a pickup or returning from a drop-off point. Mobile apps have been written that help a driver be aware of and manage such costs has been introduced.

=== Effects on infrastructure ===
Ridesharing companies have affected traffic congestion and Airbnb has affected housing availability. According to transportation analyst Charles Komanoff, "Uber-caused congestion has reduced traffic speeds in downtown Manhattan by around 8 percent".

=== Effects on crime and litigation ===
Depending on the structure of the country's legal system, companies involved in the sharing economy may shift legal realm where cases involving sharers is disputed. Technology (such as algorithmic controls) which connects sharers also allows for the development of policies and standards of service. Companies can act as 'guardians' of their customer base by monitoring their employee's behavior. For example, Uber and Lyft can monitor their employees' driving behavior, location, and provide emergency assistance. Several studies have shown that in the United States, the sharing economy restructures how legal disputes are resolved and who is considered the victims of potential crime.

In the United States's civil law, the dispute is between two individuals, determining which individual (if any) is the victim of the other party. U.S. criminal law considers the actions of a criminal who "victimizes" the state or federal law(s) by breaking said law(s). In criminal law cases, a government court punishes the offender to make the legal victim (the government) whole, but any civilian victim does not necessarily receive restitution from the state. In civil law cases, it is the direct victim party, not the state, who receives the compensatory restitution, fees, or fines. While it is possible for both kinds of law to apply to a case, the additional contracts created in sharing economy agreements creates the opportunity for more cases to be classified as civil law disputes. When the sharing economy is directly involved, the victim is the individual rather than the state. This means the civilian victim of a crime is more likely to receive compensation under a civil law case in the sharing economy than in the criminal law precedent. The introduction of civil law cases has the potential to increase victims' ability to be made whole, since the legal change shifts incentives of consumers towards action.

== Benefits ==
Suggested benefits of the sharing economy include:

=== Additional flexible job opportunities as gig workers ===
Freelance work entails better opportunities for employment, as well as more flexibility for workers, since people have the ability to pick and choose the time and place of their work. As freelance workers, people can plan around their existing schedules and maintain multiple jobs if needed. Evidence of the appeal to this type of work can be seen from a 2015 survey conducted by the Freelancers Union, which showed that around 34% of the U.S. population was involved in freelance work.

Freelance work can also be beneficial for small businesses. During their early developmental stages, many small companies can't afford or aren't in need of full-time departments, but rather require specialized work for a certain project or for a short period of time. With freelance workers offering their services in the sharing economy, firms are able to save money on long-term labor costs and increase marginal revenue from their operations.

The sharing economy allows workers to set their own hours of work. An Uber driver explains, "the flexibility extends far beyond the hours you choose to work on any given week. Since you don't have to make any sort of commitment, you can easily take time off for the big moments in your life as well, such as vacations, a wedding, the birth of a child, and more." Workers are able to accept or reject additional work based on their needs while using the commodities they already possess to make money. It provides increased flexibility of work hours and wages for independent contractors of the sharing economy

Depending on their schedules and resources, workers can provide services in more than one area with different companies. This allows workers to relocate and continue earning income. Also, by working for such companies, the transaction costs associated with occupational licenses are significantly lowered. For example, in New York City, taxi drivers must have a special driver's license and undergo training and background checks, while Uber contractors can offer "their services for little more than a background check".

The percentage of seniors in the work force increased from 20.7% in 2009 to 23.1% in 2015, an increase in part attributed to additional employment as gig workers.

=== Transparent and open data increases innovation ===
A common premise is that when information about goods is shared (typically via an online marketplace), the value of those goods may increase for the business, for individuals, for the community and for society in general.

Many state, local and federal governments are engaged in open data initiatives and projects such as data.gov. The theory of open or "transparent" access to information enables greater innovation, and makes for more efficient use of products and services, and thus supporting resilient communities.

=== Reduction in unused value ===
Unused value refers to the time over which products, services, and talents lay idle. This idle time is wasted value that business models and organizations that are based on sharing can potentially utilize. The classic example is that the average car is unused 95% of the time. This wasted value can be a significant resource, and hence an opportunity, for sharing economy car solutions. There is also significant unused value in "wasted time", as articulated by Clay Shirky in his analysis of the power of crowds connected by information technology. Many people have unused capacity in the course of their day. With social media and information technology, such people can donate small slivers of time to take care of simple tasks that others need doing. Examples of these crowdsourcing solutions include the for-profit Amazon Mechanical Turk and the non-profit Ushahidi.

Christopher Koopman, an author of a 2015 study by George Mason University economists, said the sharing economy "allows people to take idle capital and turn them into revenue sources". He has stated, "People are taking spare bedroom[s], cars, tools they are not using and becoming their own entrepreneurs."

Arun Sundararajan, a New York University economist who studies the sharing economy, told a congressional hearing that "this transition will have a positive impact on economic growth and welfare, by stimulating new consumption, by raising productivity, and by catalyzing individual innovation and entrepreneurship".

=== Lower prices due to increased competition and reusing items ===
Data from a study showed that with Airbnb's entry into the market in Austin, Texas hotels were required to lower prices by 6 percent to keep up with Airbnb's lower prices.

The sharing economy lowers consumer costs via borrowing and recycling items.

=== Environmental benefits ===
The sharing economy reduces negative environmental impacts by decreasing the amount of goods needed to be produced, cutting down on industry pollution (such as reducing the carbon footprint and overall consumption of resources)

The sharing economy allows the reuse and repurpose of already existing commodities. Under this business model, private owners share the assets they already possess when not in use.

The sharing economy accelerates sustainable consumption and production patterns.

In 2019 a comprehensive study checked the effect of one sharing platform, which facilitate the sharing of around 7,000 product and services, on greenhouse gas emissions. It found the emissions were reduced by 77%–85%.

=== Access to goods without the requirement to purchase ===
The sharing economy provides people with access to goods who can't afford or have no interest in buying them.

=== Increase in quality of products and services ===
The sharing economy facilitates increased quality of service through rating systems provided by companies involved in the sharing economy It also facilitates increased quality of service provided by incumbent firms that work to keep up with sharing firms like Uber and Lyft

=== Other benefits ===
A study in Intereconomics / The Review of European Economic Policy noted that the sharing economy has the potential to bring many benefits for the economy, while noting that this presupposes that the success of sharing economy services reflects their business models rather than 'regulatory arbitrage' from avoiding the regulation that affects traditional businesses.

Additional benefits include:

- Strengthening communities
- Increased independence, flexibility and self-reliance by decentralization, the abolition of monetary entry-barriers, and self-organization
- Increased participatory democracy
- Maximum benefit for sellers and buyers: Enables users to improve living standards by eliminating the emotional, physical, and social burdens of ownership. Without the need to maintain a large inventory, deadweight loss is reduced, prices are kept low, all while remaining competitive in the markets.
- New jobs are created, and products bought, as people acquire items such as cars or apartments to use in the sharing economy activities.

== Criticism ==
Oxford Internet Institute Economic Geographer Mark Graham argued that key parts of the sharing economy impose a new balance of power onto workers. By bringing together workers in low- and high-income countries, gig economy platforms that are not geographically confined can bring about a 'race to the bottom' for workers.

=== Relationship to job loss ===
New York Magazine wrote that the sharing economy has succeeded in large part because the real economy has been struggling. Specifically, in the magazine's view, the sharing economy succeeds because of a depressed labor market, in which "lots of people are trying to fill holes in their income by monetizing their stuff and their labor in creative ways", and in many cases, people join the sharing economy because they've recently lost a full-time job, including a few cases where the pricing structure of the sharing economy may have made their old jobs less profitable (e.g. full-time taxi drivers who may have switched to Lyft or Uber). The magazine writes that "In almost every case, what compels people to open up their homes and cars to complete strangers is money, not trust.... Tools that help people trust in the kindness of strangers might be pushing hesitant sharing-economy participants over the threshold to adoption. But what's getting them to the threshold in the first place is a damaged economy and harmful public policy that has forced millions of people to look to odd jobs for sustenance."

Uber's "audacious plan to replace human drivers" may increase job loss as even freelance driving will be replaced by automation.

However, in a report published in January 2017, Carl Benedikt Frey found that while the introduction of Uber had not led to jobs being lost, but had caused a reduction in the incomes of incumbent taxi drivers of almost 10%. Frey found that the "sharing economy", and Uber, in particular, has had substantial negative impacts on workers' wages.

Some people believe the Great Recession led to the expansion of the sharing economy because job losses enhanced the desire for temporary work, which is prevalent in the sharing economy. However, there are disadvantages to the worker; when companies use contract-based employment, the "advantage for a business of using such non-regular workers is obvious: It can lower labor costs dramatically, often by 30 percent, since it is not responsible for health benefits, social security, unemployment or injured workers' compensation, paid sick or vacation leave and more. Contract workers, who are barred from forming unions and have no grievance procedure, can be dismissed without notice".

=== Treatment of workers as independent contractors and not employees ===
There is debate over the status of the workers within the sharing economy; whether they should be treated as independent contractors or employees of the companies. This issue seems to be most relevant among sharing economy companies such as Uber. The reason this has become such a major issue is that the two types of workers are treated very differently. Contract workers are not guaranteed any benefits and pay can be below average. However, if they are employees, they are granted access to benefits and pay is generally higher. This has been described as "shifting liabilities and responsibilities" to the workers, while denying them the traditional job security. It has been argued that this trend is de facto "obliterating the achievements of unions thus far in their struggle to secure basic mutual obligations in worker-employer relations".

In Uberland: How the Algorithms are Rewriting the Rules of Work, technology ethnographer Alex Rosenblat argues that Uber's reluctance to classify its drivers as "employees" strips them of their agency as the company's revenue-generating workforce, resulting in lower compensation and, in some cases, risking their safety. In particular, Rosenblat critiques Uber's ratings system, which she argues elevates passengers to the role of "middle managers" without offering drivers the chance to contest poor ratings. Rosenblat notes that poor ratings, or any other number of unspecified breaches of conduct, can result in an Uber driver's "deactivation", an outcome Rosenblat likens to being fired without notice or stated cause. Prosecutors have used Uber's opaque firing policy as evidence of illegal worker misclassification; Shannon Liss-Riordan, an attorney leading a class action lawsuit against the company, claims that "the ability to fire at will is an important factor in showing a company's workers are employees, not independent contractors."

The California Public Utilities Commission filed a case, later settled out of court, that "addresses the same underlying issue seen in the contract worker controversy—whether the new ways of operating in the sharing economy model should be subject to the same regulations governing traditional businesses". Like Uber, Instacart faced similar lawsuits. In 2015, a lawsuit was filed against Instacart alleging the company misclassified a person who buys and delivers groceries as an independent contractor. Instacart had to eventually make all such people as part-time employees and had to accord benefits such as health insurance to those qualifying. This led to Instacart having thousands of employees overnight from zero.

A 2015 article by economists at George Mason University argued that many of the regulations circumvented by sharing economy businesses are exclusive privileges lobbied for by interest groups. Workers and entrepreneurs not connected to the interest groups engaging in this rent-seeking behavior are thus restricted from entry into the market. For example, taxi unions lobbying a city government to restrict the number of cabs allowed on the road prevents larger numbers of drivers from entering the marketplace.

The same research finds that while access economy workers do lack the protections that exist in the traditional economy, many of them cannot actually find work in the traditional economy. In this sense, they are taking advantage of opportunities that the traditional regulatory framework has not been able to provide for them. As the sharing economy grows, governments at all levels are reevaluating how to adjust their regulatory schemes to accommodate these workers.

However, a 2021 research on Uber's downfall in Turkey, which was carried out with user-generated content from TripAdvisor comments and YouTube videos related to Uber use in Istanbul, finds that the main reasons for people to use Uber are that since the drivers are independent, they tend to treat the customers in a kinder way than the regular taxi drivers and that it's much cheaper to use Uber. Although, Turkish taxi drivers claim that Uber's operations in Turkey are illegal because the independent drivers don't pay the operating license fee, which is compulsory for taxi drivers to pay, to the government. Their efforts led to the banning of Uber in Turkey by the Turkish government in October 2019. After being unavailable for approximately two years, Uber eventually became available again in Turkey in January 2021.

=== Benefits not accrued evenly ===
Andrew Leonard, Evgeny Morozov, criticized the for-profit sector of the sharing economy, writing that sharing economy businesses "extract" profits from their given sector by "successfully [making] an end run around the existing costs of doing business"—taxes, regulations, and insurance. Similarly, in the context of online freelancing marketplaces, there have been worries that the sharing economy could result in a 'race to the bottom' in terms of wages and benefits: as millions of new workers from low-income countries come online.

Susie Cagle wrote that the benefits big sharing economy players might be making for themselves are "not exactly" trickling down, and that the sharing economy "doesn't build trust" because where it builds new connections, it often "replicates old patterns of privileged access for some, and denial for others". William Alden wrote that "The so-called sharing economy is supposed to offer a new kind of capitalism, one where regular folks, enabled by efficient online platforms, can turn their fallow assets into cash machines ... But the reality is that these markets also tend to attract a class of well-heeled professional operators, who outperform the amateurs—just like the rest of the economy".

The local economic benefit of the sharing economy is offset by its current form, which is that huge tech companies reap a great deal of profit in many cases. For example, Uber, which is estimated to be worth $50B as of mid-2015, takes up to 30% commission from the gross revenue of its drivers, leaving many drivers making less than minimum wage. This is reminiscent of a peak Rentier state "which derives all or a substantial portion of its national revenues from the rent of indigenous resources to external clients".

=== Other issues ===
- Companies such as Airbnb and Uber do not share reputation data. Individual behavior on any one platform doesn't transfer to other platforms. This fragmentation has some negative consequences, such as the Airbnb squatters who had previously deceived Kickstarter users to the tune of $40,000. Sharing data between these platforms could have prevented the repeat incident. Business Insider's view is that since the sharing economy is in its infancy, this has been accepted. However, as the industry matures, this will need to change.
- Giana Eckhardt and Fleura Bardhi say that the access economy promotes and prioritizes cheap fares and low costs rather than personal relationships, which is tied to similar issues in crowdsourcing. For example, consumers reap similar benefits from Zipcar as they would from a hotel. In this example, the primary concern is the low cost. Because of this, the "sharing economy" may not be about sharing but rather about access. Giana Eckhardt and Fleura Bardhi say the "sharing" economy has taught people to prioritize cheap and easy access over interpersonal communication, and the value of going the extra mile for those interactions has diminished.
- Concentration of power can lead to unethical business practices. By using a software named 'Greyball', Uber was able to make it difficult for regulatory officials to use the application. Another scheme allegedly implemented by Uber includes using its application to show 'phantom' cars nearby to consumers on the app, implying shorter pick-up times than could actually be expected. Uber denied the allegation.
- Regulations that cover traditional taxi companies but not ridesharing companies can put taxis at a competitive disadvantage. Uber has faced criticism from taxi drivers worldwide due to the increased competition. Uber has also been banned from several jurisdictions due to failure to comply with licensing laws.
- An umbrella sharing service named Sharing E Umbrella was started in 11 cities across China in 2017 lost almost all of the 300,000 umbrellas placed out for sharing purposes during the first few weeks.
- Treatment of workers/Lack of employee benefits: Since access economy companies rely on independent contractors, they are not offered the same protections as that of full-time salary employees in terms of workers comp, retirement plans, sick leave, and unemployment. This debate has caused Uber to have to remove their presence in several locations such as Alaska. Uber stirred up a large controversy in Alaska because if Uber drivers were considered registered taxi drivers, that would mean they would be entitled to receiving workers' compensation insurance. However, if they were considered independent contractors they would not receive these same benefits. Due to all of the disputes, Uber pulled services from Alaska. In addition, ride-share drivers' status continues to be ambiguous when it comes to legal matters. On New Year's Eve in 2013, an off-duty driver for Uber killed a pedestrian while looking for a rider. Since the driver was considered a contractor, Uber would not compensate for the victim's family. The contract states that the service is a matching platform and "the company does not provide transportation services, and ... has no liability for services ... provided by third parties."
- Quality discrepancies: Since access economy companies rely on independent workers, the quality of service can differ between various individual providers on the same platform. In 2015, Steven Hill from the New America Foundation cited his experience signing up to become a host on Airbnb as simple as uploading a few photos to the website "and within 15 minutes my place was 'live' like an Airbnb rental. No background check, no verifying my ID, no confirming my personal details, no questions asked. Not even any contact with a real human from their trust and safety team. Nothing." However, due to the reputation model, customers are provided with a peer-reviewed rating of the provider and are given a choice of whether to proceed with the transaction.
- Inadequate liability guarantees: Though some companies offer liability guarantees such as Airbnb's "Host Guarantee" that promises to pay up to 1 million in damages, it is extremely difficult to prove fault.
- Ownership and usage: The access economy blurs the difference between ownership and usage, which allows for the abuse or neglect of items absent policies.
- Replacement of small local companies with large international tech companies. For example, taxi companies tend to be locally owned and operated, while Uber is California-based. Therefore, taxi company profits tend to stay local, while some portion of access economy profits flows out of the local community.

== Examples ==
Agriculture

- Garden sharing
- Heifer International
- Seed swap

Finance

- Crowdfunding
- Peer-to-peer banking
- Peer-to-peer lending
- Virtual economy

Food

- Food bank
- Social dining

Property

- Bartering
- Book swapping
- Borrowing center
- Clothes swapping
- Fractional ownership
- Give-away shop
- Library of things
- Timeshare
- Toy library

Labor

- Expert network
- Open innovation
- Open source product development
- Coworking
- Freelance marketplace
- Local exchange trading system
- Time banks

Real estate

- Co-housing
- Coliving
- Collaborative workspace
- CouchSurfing
- Emergencybnb
- Home exchange

Transportation

- Bicycle-sharing system
- Carpool
- Carsharing and peer-to-peer carsharing
- Flight sharing
- Share taxi
- Electric two-wheeler sharing
- Ridesharing company
- Vanpool

Governance

- Government by algorithm

Business

- Product service system

Technology

- Cloud computing
- GNU Project
- Open-source software
- Volunteer computing

Digital rights

- Copyleft
- Free art license
- Open content

Other

- Club theory
- Wikimedia movement
- Wikipedia

== Principles for regulation in the sharing economy ==
In order to reap the real benefits of a sharing economy and somehow address some issues that revolve around it, there is a great need for the government and policy-makers to create the "right enabling framework based on a set of guiding principles" proposed by the World Economic Forum. These principles are derived from the analysis of global policymaking and consultation with experts. The following are the seven principles for regulation in the sharing economy.

1. The first principle is creating space for innovation. This entails that "governments need to provide an initially encouraging environment while also building necessary infrastructure to allow for the development of innovation hubs."
2. The second principle is that sharing economy should be people centered. This means that policies should be focused on "increasing the overall welfare of the population" as well as "improving the quality of life."
3. The third principle is taking a proactive approach. This means that "new business models need to be brought into the mainstream and governments need to make clear frameworks that minimize uncertainty."
4. The fourth principle is the assessment of the whole regulatory system which means administrative burdens on existing systems should be lifted in order to give equal level of access to all actors in the network.
5. The fifth principle is the data-driven government. Since most sharing economy relies on the use of digital platforms, data can be easily collected, analyzed, and shared which can boost the urban environment through public-private partnerships.
6. The sixth principle talks about the flexible governance where actors should consider the nature of technology which is fast evolving. This calls for a sustained dialogue with key stakeholders, so all interests and rights are further protected and safeguarded.
7. The last principle is a shared regulation where all the players should be involved in regulatory discussions as well as in the enforcement of policy.

== See also ==
- Alternative purchase network
- Collaborative consumption
- Common ownership
- Gig worker
- Holiday cottage
- Library economy
- List of gig economy companies
- Platform economy
- Post-capitalism
- Vacation rental
