= Theys (surname) =

Theys (Flemish: variant of Thijs from a short form of the personal name Mathijs Dutch form of Matthew) is a surname. Notable people with the surname include:

- Daniël Theys, (born 1953), Belgian glassmaker
- Didier Theys (born 1956), Belgian sports car driver
- Frank Theys, (born 1963), Belgian filmmaker and visual artist
- Lucien Theys (1927–1996), Belgian long-distance runner
