= Emakina Group =

Belgian advertising agency

Emakina Group SA
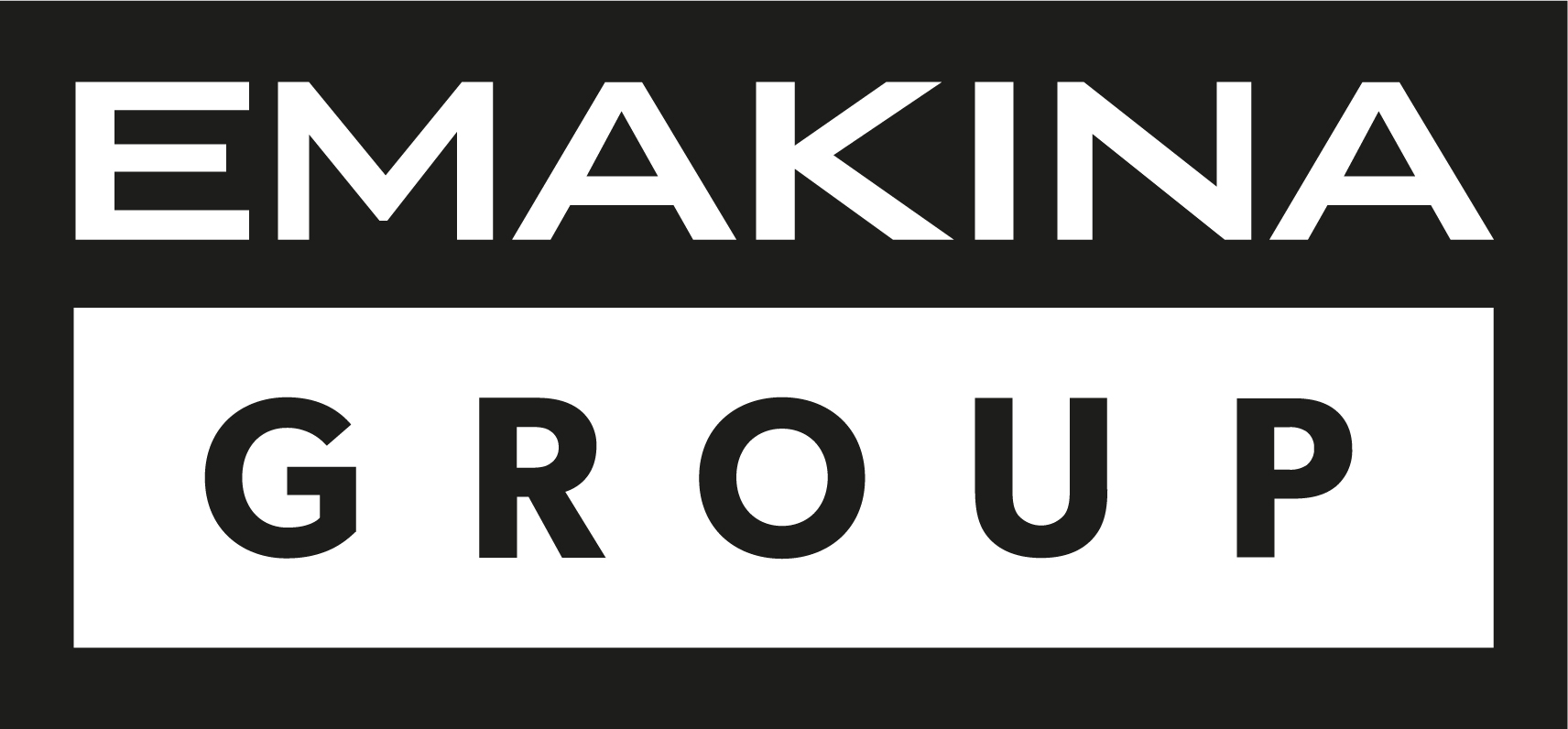
- Company type: Société Anonyme
- Traded as: Euronext Brussels: ALEMK
- Industry: Advertising agency
- Predecessor: Ex Machina, Emalaya
- Founded: 2001; 25 years ago
- Founder: Brice Le Blevennec
- Headquarters: Brussels, Belgium
- Number of locations: 26 offices
- Area served: Europe, Middle East and America
- Key people: Brice Le Blevennec (CEO), Karim Chouikri (CEO)
- Services: Advertising
- Revenue: 99 millions € (2020)
- Number of employees: 1100 (2021)
- Parent: EPAM Systems
- Website: www.emakina.group

The Emakina Group is Belgium advertising agency group that operates a number of digital communication agencies that are focused in Europe.

Headquartered in Brussels, it has agencies in Austria, Croatia, France, India, Saudi Arabia, Poland, Qatar, Serbia, Sweden, Singapore, Switzerland, the Netherlands, Turkey, UAE, and via its agency The Reference the United States since 2016. In 2021 the company was acquired by U.S.-based digital transformation systems company EPAM Systems.

== History ==
Emakina was founded in 2001, with the merger of Ex Machina and Emalaya. Digital design studio Ex Machina was founded by Brice Le Blevennec age 23. E-business agency Emalaya was started by Denis Steisel in 1998. At the moment of their merger, they had 35 employees.

By 2016, the Emakina Group reported sales of EUR 77.3 million. It was listed on Alternext of Euronext Brussels in 2006 as ALEMK.

In February 2018, Emakina Group acquired New York Digital agency Karbyn for US$500,000‍ in cash.

In December 2021, EPAM Systems acquired Emakina Group.

== Subsidiaries ==
As of July 2017, the main subsidiary companies of this group are:

- Emakina – a digital agency spread across 10 offices around Europe.
- The Reference – a Ghent and Antwerp-based digital agency with an additional office in New York. Founded in 1993, it was acquired by Emakina in 2007.
- Your Agency – a Belgian marketing agency.
- Robert & Marien – a Brussels-based media agency which delivers strategy and buying for all media.

== Accomplishments ==
Emakina has executed digital projects for companies like Audi, AXA, Brussels Airlines, Deutsche Bank, Education Above All, Engie Electrabel, FIVB, Karl Lagerfeld, Lufthansa, Parrot, Rituals, and Segway.

Emakina has won multiple awards for projects in digital marketing, websites, e-commerce, applications and communication campaigns for clients like BIC, My Way, and Jaeger Le-Coultre and was elected Horizon Interactive Agency of the Year.
