= Electric two-wheeler sharing =

Electric two-wheeler sharing is a form of personal public transport that draws on collaborative consumption models of the sharing economy to provide a shared fleet of electric-assist pedal vehicles. It is a product service system more closely aligned to a bicycle sharing system than to carsharing.

In June 2014 Bradley Schroeder introduced the term e2W to describe such systems in a presentation at the Asian region meeting of the Institute for Transportation Development Policy in Jakarta, Indonesia. In his book Bicycle Sharing 101: Getting the Wheels Turning', Schroeder concluded that "An area of potential huge growth is whether e-bike sharing can replace private scooter trips in Asian cities, where scooter use can be up to 75 percent." In Ho Chi Minh City, Vietnam, 78% of trips are made by scooters or motorcycles, with annual growth rates of 8.4% to the total fleet, according to the Asian Development Bank.

Motivations for the implementation of e2W systems are that they would provide an alternative to privately owned motorized two-wheeled vehicles, allowing the political will to regulate motor bikes in terms of parking, acceleration, top speeds, tail-pipe emissions and sound pollution.
