= Arun Sundararajan =

American economist

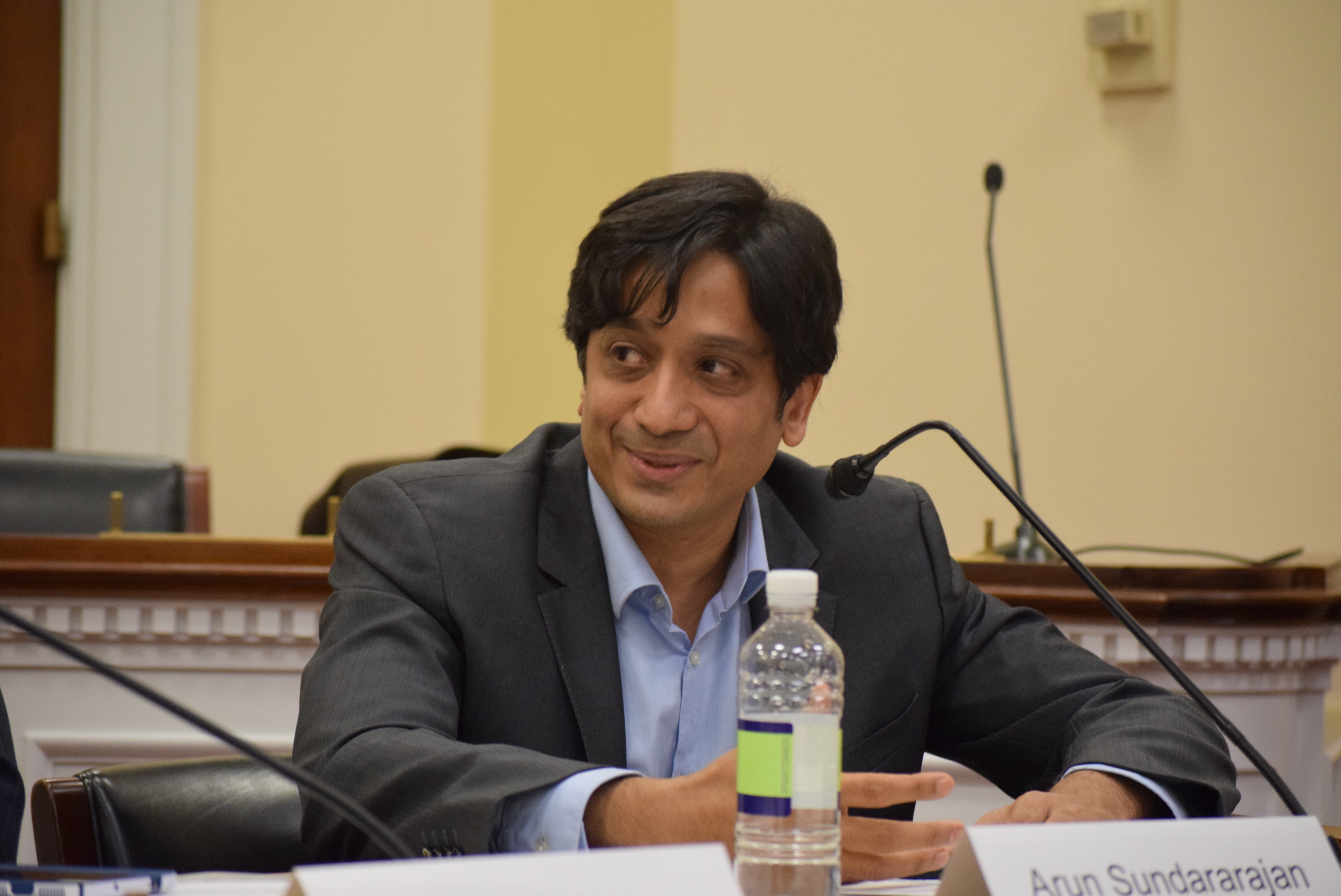
- Education: University of Rochester; Indian Institute of Technology Madras
- Known for: Network effects Digital rights management Price discrimination
- Scientific career
- Fields: Economics; Information Systems; Network Science; Economy of India
- Workplaces: New York University

Arun Sundararajan (Tamil: அருண் சுந்தர்ராஜன்) (born in the United Kingdom) is the Harold Price Professor of Entrepreneurship and Professor of Technology, Operations, and Statistics at the Stern School of Business, New York University. For 2010–12, he is the Distinguished Academic Fellow at the Center for IT and the Networked Economy, Indian School of Business. Sundararajan is an expert on the economics of digital goods and network effects. He also conducts research about network science and the socioeconomic transformation of India.

== Life and work ==
Arun Sundararajan graduated from the Indian Institute of Technology Madras in 1993 with a BTech in electrical engineering. He subsequently attended the University of Rochester where he received an M.Phil. in operations research and a PhD in business administration. After he earned his doctorate, he joined the faculty at New York University, where his work focuses on the transformation of business and society by information technologies, and the Indian economy.

Sundararajan's scholarly research analyzes what makes the economics of IT products and industries unique. He asserts that there are three technological invariants—digitization, exponential growth, and modularity—that have characterized and distinguished information technologies since the 1960s, and that these invariants lead to the ubiquity of information goods, digital piracy and network effects in IT industries. His research papers illustrate how these distinctive economics of information technologies warrant new pricing strategies, careful digital rights management, and a deeper understanding of network structure and dynamics.

Sundararajan periodically writes and speaks about transformation through information technologies and business with a frequent focus on privacy and on India. He has been elected to the editorial boards of the prestigious journals Management Science and Information Systems Research. He co-founded the NYU Summer Workshop on the Economics of Information Technology and the Workshop on Information in Networks. He received a 2010 Google-WPP Marketing Research Award, the Best Paper award at the 2008 INFORMS Conference on Information Systems and Technology, and the Best Overall Paper award at the 2004 International Conference on Information Systems.

== See also ==
- Digital rights management
- Network effects
- Price discrimination
- Sharing economy

== Bibliography ==
Patent:

- US patent 7848979, Sundararajan, Arun; Ipeirotis, Panagiotis and Anindya Ghose, "System, method, software arrangement and computer-accessible medium for incorporating qualitative and quantitative information into an economic model", issued 7 December 2010

Book:

- Arun Sundararajan (13 May 2016). The Sharing Economy: The End of Employment and the Rise of Crowd-Based Capitalism. MIT Press. ISBN 978-0-262-03457-9.
