= Emergencybnb =

Website providing temporary lodging to vulnerable people

Emergencybnb was a website that aimed at helping vulnerable segments in society find free temporary lodging offered by their neighbors. A test version of the website was published in March 2016, with a catchphrase that read: "Host a refugee or a victim of domestic violence". Due to low traction at its infancy stage, the founder, a Harvard University graduate, resorted to listing his own Washington, D.C. apartment on Airbnb and reimbursed the guests in cash upon arrival. The website has gained media attention and was featured in a number of news portals.

EmergencyBnB has partnered with various organizations helping refugees, domestic violence victims, and trafficking victims around the world.

CNN referred to Emergencybnb as "An army of people who keep their homes and hearts open in case another person needs to walk through".
