= Library economy =

Theoretical economic system for a society

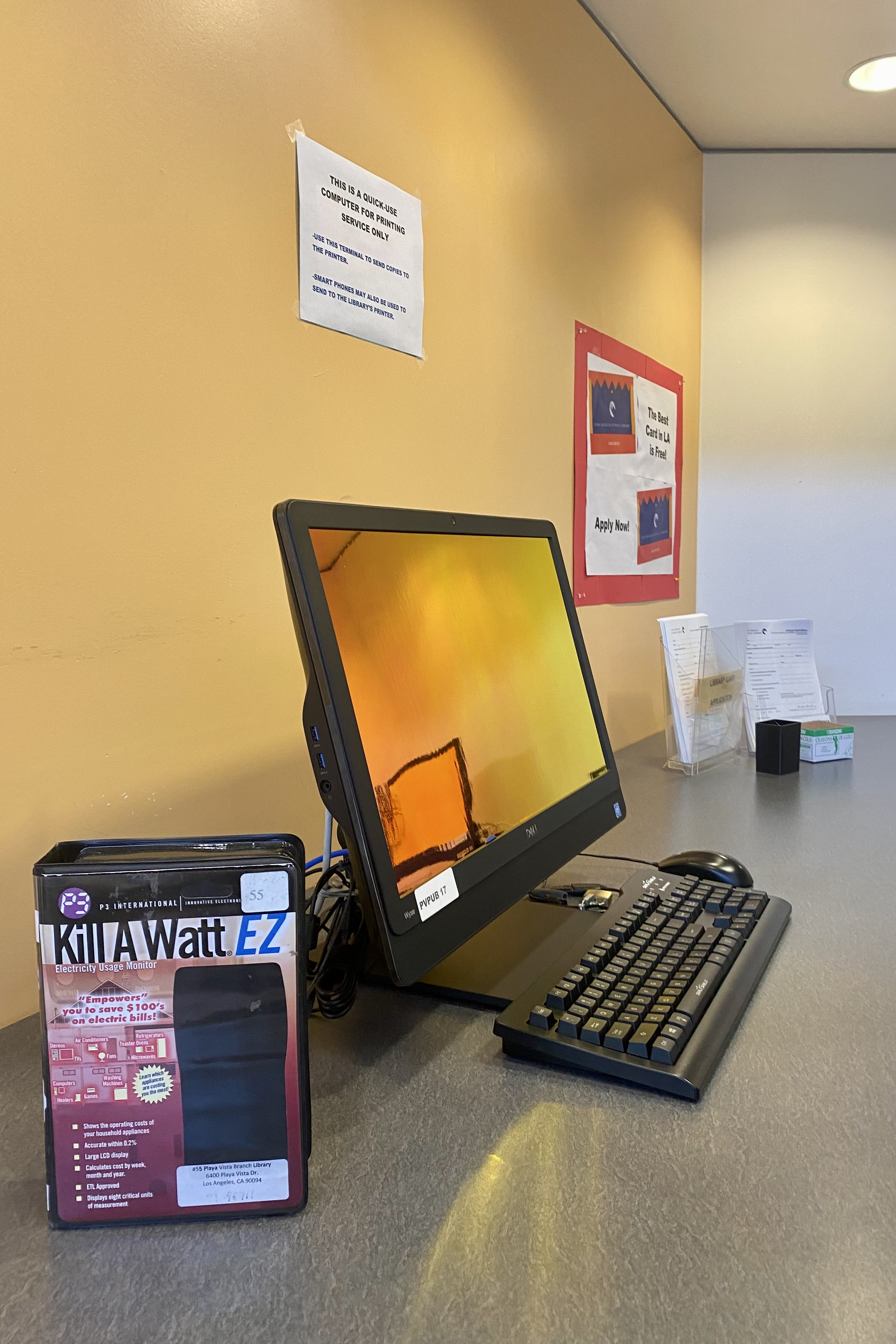
Kill A Watt, an electricity-use measurement tool, available to borrow at a Los Angeles Public Library branch.

A library economy is a theoretical economic system for a society in which traditional retail stores are replaced entirely by libraries of things, which would be organizations collectively owned by a community that loan objects that would work well in a loaning format, specifically objects that are useful occasionally but cumbersome to store, like specialized cookware and niche technological items, as well as thing traditional libraries loan such as books, journals, and media.

== Idea ==
Anything that can't be distributed well in a loaning format would instead be distributed freely through distribution based on need. This would be for things that can only be used once or would take a long time for ownership to be transferred, such as food and housing.

A library economy is an idea primarily created and promoted by anarchists and leftwing activists and philosophers.

== See also ==
- Library
- Library of things
- From each according to his ability, to each according to his needs
- Anarchist economics
