= TechnoCalyps =

- DVD cover
- Directed by: Frank Theys
- Written by: Frank Theys
- Narrated by: Jay McMahon
- Cinematography: Phyllis Digneffe; Rian Koopman; Chris Renson
- Edited by: Hans Meijer; Frank Theys
- Music by: Francisco López
- Production company: Votnik
- Distributed by: GoDigital Media Group
- Release date: May 2006 (Belgium)
- Running time: 156 minutes
- Country: Belgium
- Language: English

TechnoCalyps is a 2006 Belgian transhumanism documentary film written and directed by Frank Theys. It explores the advance of technology.

== Documentary precept ==
Set as a three-part documentary, TechnoCalyps posits that genetics, robotics, artificial intelligence, bionics, and nanotechnology seem to be converging towards a goal of having mankind transcend human limits. "Director conducts his inquiry into the scientific, ethical and metaphysical dimensions of technological development. The film includes interviews by top experts and thinkers on the subject worldwide".

== Cast ==
Jay McMahon narrated the documentary that has following interviewees:

- Ian Buruma
- Jean-Jacques Cassiman
- L. Stephen Coles
- Sadaputa Dasa
- Hugo De Garis
- Aubrey de Grey
- Theodore John Kaczynski
- Raymond Kurzweil
- Jeffrey Lichtman
- Ralph C. Merkle
- Marvin Minsky
- Hans Moravec
- Max More
- David F. Noble
- Mark Pesce
- Joe Rosen
- Kirkpatrick Sale
- Anders Sandberg
- Richard Seed
- Bruce Sterling
- Gregory Stock
- Mark W. Tilden
- Frank Tipler
- Margaret Wertheim
- Robert J. White
- Robert Anton Wilson
- Terence McKenna
- Rael
- Osman Bakar
- Michel Baudry
- Ted Berger
- Yang Dan
- Thomas B. DeMarse
- Anne Foerst
- Erin D. Green
- Mark Humayun
- Hamada Kazuyuki
- Carlo Montemagno
- Natasha Vita-More
- Jim Yount

== Reception ==
H+ Magazine wrote that the film focuses "on the various emerging technologies that Transhumanism has coalesced around and feature illuminating (or potentially terrifying) interviews with scientists working in these fields", and Crónicas de Esperantia wrote that the film was an excellent documentary that shares some future keys. Christopher Webster of Quiet Earth reviewed the documentary and wrote that it "is a really smart look at humanity's quest for immortality through science" and how with its focus on hard science "gets into how this quest effects art and culture and how the whole mess intersects to form the very fabric of who we are."

== See also ==
- Existential risk from artificial general intelligence
- Ancient astronauts
- Building Gods (documentary)
- Effective altruism
- Global catastrophic risk#Anthropogenic
