= Frank Theys =

Frank Theys (born 1963 in Uccle, Belgium) is a Belgian filmmaker and visual artist. Theys lives in Brussels and Amsterdam.

Theys' video and interactive installations to experimental film, documentary, and theater performance have been placed into collections at the MOMA in New York, the Centre National de la Cinématographie in Paris, SMAK Ghent, and the Museum for the Moving Image in New York.

In 2006 Theys collaborated with Michel Bauwens to create a three-part documentary film named TechnoCalyps.
