= Fab Lab =

British children's television series

Fab Lab is a British television programme designed for pre-school children. The show was jointly produced by the BBC and Initial Kids in 2001, and was aired on the CBeebies channel from June 2002 until 15 October 2006, as well as CBeebies on BBC Two, although repeats were put on hiatus between 19 December 2004 and 3 September 2005. It is an introduction to science, nature and technology for young children.

The program features two pixies named "Trixi" and "Dixi" and a dog (male, breed unspecified) called "Prof". Trixi and Dixi are puppets while Prof is played by a human in a whole-body dog suit.

The two pixies live under the floor of a large garden shed known as the "Fab Lab". The shed is used as a laboratory by Prof who investigates various phenomena such as shadows, rainfall or the germination of plants. He explains features of the physical and natural world to the pixies, sometimes with the aid of a personal computer which Prof uses to show video sequences. Prof is very partial to green biscuits called "Pixiebicks" with which the pixies sometimes bribe Prof to expand his explanations.

At the end of the programme a whistle is heard, upon which Prof says that "Mrs Whistle" (presumably his owner) is calling, and leaves the shed.

Some episodes are now lost as the show has never been released on DVD or VHS.

== Cast ==
- Dixi: Simon Buckley
- Trixi: Kathy Smee
- Prof: Siân Richardson (voiced by Jim Dunk)
- Assistant Puppeteers:

Judith Bucklow
Hannah Proops

- Animatronics Operator:

Daniel Carlisle

Writer & Creator Robyn Charteris

- Writer

Christopher Lillicrap
