= Michel Bauwens =

Belgian activist (born 1958)

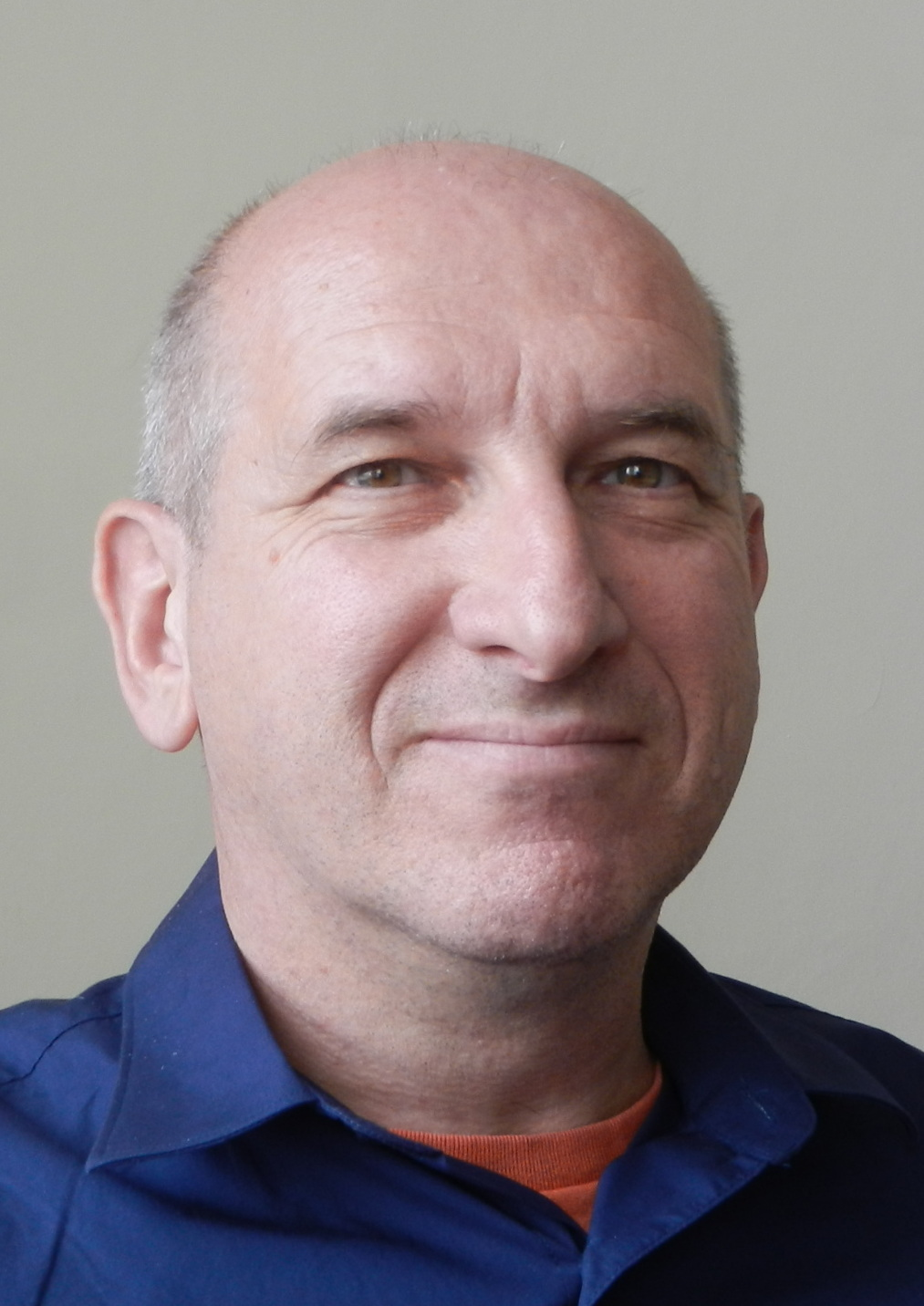
- Michel Bauwens in 2013
- Born: March 21, 1958 (age 68); Belgium
- Occupations: Activist; Founder and director of the P2P Foundation
- Website: http://p2pfoundation.net

Michel Bauwens (born 21 March 1958) is a Belgian political theorist, writer, and conference speaker on the subjects of technology, culture and business innovation. A leading thinker in the emerging field of peer-to-peer (P2P) theory, Bauwens founded the P2P Foundation, a global organization of researchers working in open collaboration in the exploration of peer production, governance, and property. He has authored a number of essays, including his thesis The Political Economy of Peer Production.

== Biography ==
Bauwens regularly lectures internationally on P2P theory, the commons, and the potential for social change. His contributions to the field were detailed by George Dafermos in chapter 7 named Prophets and Advocates of Peer Production of The Handbook of Peer Production.

In 2014, Bauwens was the research director with the FLOK Society (Free Libre Open Knowledge) at the National Institute of Advanced Studies of Ecuador (IAEN). The FLOK Society developed a first of its kind Commons Transition Plan for the Ecuadorian government. Over fifteen policy papers, the plan outlines policy proposals for transitioning Ecuador to what is described as a social knowledge economy based on the creation and support of open knowledge commons. One version of the plan is available online.

In the spring of 2017, Bauwens advised the city of Ghent, in northern Belgium (Flanders), on a similar Commons Transition Plan. Over 500 commons initiatives were mapped, 80 founders and leaders of such communities were interviewed, and 9 thematic workshops were held to coalesce their proposals in an integrated plan.

Bauwens developed "Ron Paul Maoism", a theory that builds upon the ideas of Infrared-affiliated Frogtwitter user Logo Daedalus and asserts that propertarian libertarians are carrying out Karl Marx's program of societal transformation.

He currently lives in Chiang Mai, Thailand.

== P2P theory ==
In The Political Economy of Peer Production Bauwens regards P2P phenomena as an emerging alternative to capitalism, although he argues that "peer production is highly dependent on the market, for peer production produces use-value through mostly immaterial production, without directly providing an income for its producers." However, Bauwens goes on to argue that the interdependence is mutual: the capitalist system and market economies are also dependent on P2P production, particularly on distributed networks of information processing and production. Consequently, P2P economy may be seen as extending or already existing outside the sphere of free/open source software production and other non-rival immaterial goods.

This idea is explored also in the essay Peer to Peer and Human Evolution that expands the P2P meme beyond computer technology. It argues that egalitarian networking is a new form of relationship that is emerging throughout society, and profoundly transforming the way in which society and human civilization is organised. The essay argues that new forms of non-representational politics are a crucial ingredient in finding the solutions to current global challenges; as well as a new and progressive ethos representing the highest aspirations of the new generations.

== Honors and awards ==
- USIA Meritorious Honor Award, July 1990
- BP Information Star Prize for Innovative Applications of Information Technology: "For the concept and creation of a total electronic information environment for the provision of business intelligence to senior management", January 1993
- European Special Librarian of the Year award, "For outstanding role in redefining the profession in harmony with the advances in technology", December 1993
- 2012 - Bauwens was nominated and included on the Post Growth Institute Enrich List – a parody of the Forbes List of Billionaires that aims to highlight influential post-growth thinkers "whose collective contributions enrich paths to sustainable futures".

== Controversy ==
Bauwens has repeatedly spoken out against identity politics, claiming it as antithetical to egalitarian participation within a post-racial community. This perspective was criticized as being a form of racial color blindness. In response, numerous contributors to the P2P Forum chose to officially distance themselves from him and his views. In May 2021, Bauwens allegedly removed several signatories of the disassociation statement from the P2P Foundation wiki. Since it is a community-maintained wiki, this raised further controversy. Two weeks later, Bauwens also edited the P2PF wiki article of P2P Lab (where several signatories belonged) diminishing its role. The wiki entries have been restored by other wiki editors.

== Works ==
Bauwens has written for Open Democracy and Al Jazeera and has been mentioned by The New York Times, De Morgen, and Living Green Magazine.

=== Books ===
- 2013, "De wereld redden Met peer-to-peer naar een postkapitalistische samenleving", by Michel Bauwens and Jean Lievens, Houtekiet, ISBN 9789089242549
- 2014, "Network Society and Future Scenarios for a Collaborative Economy", by Vasilis Kostakis and Michel Bauwens, Palgrave Macmillan, ISBN 9781137415066
- 2015, "Sauver le monde, Vers une société post-capitaliste avec le peer-to-peer", by Michel Bauwens and Jean Lievens, Les liens qui libèrent preface by Bernard Stiegler (at editionslesliensquiliberent), ISBN 979-10-209-0183-5
- 2019, "Peer to Peer: The Commons Manifesto", by Michel Bauwens, Vasilis Kostakis and Alex Pazaitis, University of Westminster Press, ISBN 978-1-911534-77-8

=== Essays ===
- Peer-to-Peer Relationality by Michel Bauwens, 4 March 2012, published on blog.p2pfoundation.net
- 2014, "From the Communism of Capital to Capital for the Commons: Towards an Open Co-operativism", Bauwens, Michel and Vasilis Kostakis, Triple-C: Communication, Capitalism & Critique, 12(1)

=== Reports ===
- A Synthetic Overview of the Collaborative Economy. By Michel Bauwens, Nicolas Mendoza and Franco Iacomella, et al. Orange Labs and P2P Foundation, 2012.

=== Documentaries ===
- With Frank Theys, Bauwens is the co-creator of the 2006 documentary TechnoCalyps, an examination of transhumanism and the 'metaphysics of technology'.

=== Speeches ===
- In September 2014 he gave a keynote at the Degrowth Conferences in Leipzig, Germany on "The Transition to a Sustainable Commons Society in Ecuador and beyond".

== See also ==
- Adhocracy
- Commons-based peer production
- Digital revolution
- Distributed economy
- Knowledge commons
- Network economy
- Open design
- Open Source Ecology
- Open source hardware
- Open-source movement
- P2P economic system
- Post-scarcity economy
- Sharing economy
