= Platform capitalism =

Business model of technological platforms

Platform capitalism refers to the activities of companies such as Google, Facebook, Apple, Microsoft, Uber, Airbnb, Amazon and others to operate as platforms. In this business model both hardware and software are used as a foundation (platform) for other actors to conduct their own business. The term was coined by Nick Srnicek, who wrote a book of the same name.

Platform capitalism has been both heralded as beneficial and denounced as detrimental by various authors. The trends identified in platform capitalism have similarities with those described under the heading of surveillance capitalism. Technology companies build platforms that entire industries rely on, and those industries can easily collapse due to the decisions of those technology companies.

The possible effect of platform capitalism on open science has been discussed.

Platform capitalism has been contrasted with platform cooperativism. Companies that try to focus on fairness and sharing, instead of just profit motive, are described as cooperatives, whereas more traditional and common companies that focus solely on profit, like Airbnb and Uber, are platform capitalists (or cooperativist platforms vs capitalist platforms). In turn, projects like Wikipedia, which rely on unpaid labor of volunteers, can be classified as commons-based peer-production initiatives.

== See also ==
- Enshittification
- Platform economy
