= Full Belly Project =

US-based non-profit organization

The Full Belly Project Ltd is a non-profit organization based out of Wilmington, North Carolina, which designs labor-saving devices to improve the lives of people in developing communities. It was founded by Jock Brandis. Their main devices are the Universal Nut Sheller (UNS) and the Rocker Water Pump. The first device they designed, the UNS, started as a peanut sheller but was eventually used with other crops as well. It is now used for coffee, jatropha, neem, and shea in 35 countries in Africa, Asia and Latin America. From 2009 onwards, their research was focused on designing a water pump. The organization was dissolved in December 2020.

== Universal Nut Sheller ==
Their primary objective was to increase the cost effectiveness of peanut agriculture as a means of sustainable development in those countries, through the development of affordable appropriate technology. There are an estimated half billion people across the globe in over 100 countries, primarily in the equatorial regions and particularly in Africa, dependent upon peanuts as their primary source of protein.

The major limiting factor for growing peanuts has always been the time- and labor-intensive process of hand-shelling peanuts, a job usually relegated to women and children. Overcoming this technical obstacle has been a goal of agricultural research for some years. When Dr. T. Williams, senior research scientist at University of Georgia and an expert on all 15,000 cultivars of peanuts, was first approached by Jock Brandis, the project's engineer, he stated that an affordable peanut sheller is considered the "holy grail of sustainable development".

The final design for the machine was completed in January 2005, and has come to be known as the Universal Nut Sheller. This relatively small, hand-powered device made from two pieces of concrete and a handful of metal pieces is able to shell at a rate of 50 kg of peanuts an hour. On average, an individual woman or child can hand shell 1.5 kg of peanuts in a single hour. Furthermore, one set of fiberglass molds can reproduce an indefinite number of machines. Raw materials for the machine include only half a sack of concrete and a few metal parts, which cost less than $50 US per machine. Maintenance is nearly zero, and a machine's lifespan is estimated at twenty years.

Other versions of the UNS have been designed:

- An "electrical powered sheller" has been designed in 2008 after a request from an orphanage in Haiti and is also distributed in Guyana.
- A "pedal powered sheller" was designed in 2009 to shell faster. It has been distributed in the Philippines, in Guyana, and in Guatemala.

== Soap for Hope ==
In keeping with their mission of changing the world for the "bottom billion" through production of self-sustainable technologies, the Full Belly Project and partners at Diversey introduced the soap press in 2013. Known as Soap for Hope, this project reuses a portion the millions of pounds of soap that are thrown away annually by local hotels and resorts. The soap press allows communities to produce and distribute recycled soap products to fend off disease, promote better health, and generate income for impoverished communities around the world. The Full Belly Project developed a "soap press in a box" micro-factory to ship abroad for assembly, granting entrepreneurial opportunity to those with less access to proper sanitation and resources.

The soap press is now in 18 countries around the world providing over 41,000 people with soap.

== Distributing technology ==
The organization collaborated with like-minded development organizations in an effort to target areas most in need of this sustainable technology. Since finishing the final design of the Universal Nut Sheller, The Full Belly Project has distributed machines in The Bahamas, Uganda, Liberia, Côte d'Ivoire, Ghana, Gambia, Zambia, The Philippines, Haiti, Guyana, India, Jamaica, Kenya, Mali, Nigeria, Sudan, The Democratic Republic of Congo, Senegal, Guatemala, Tajikistan, Sierra Leone, Zimbabwe, and Malawi.

With a few manual adjustments the machine is also capable of shelling winged beans, neem seeds (from neem trees, also known as margosa), Jatropha curcas, wet and dried coffee, and shea. All of these seeds/nuts are lucrative once they have been processed. Most cultivation of these crops occurs in developing countries. Machines like the Universal Nut Sheller add value to these crops and instantly improve the lives of those who use these labor-saving devices.

== Impact on women ==
This technology is particularly empowering for women in that it relieves them of the burden of hand-shelling Jatropha curcas, shea, coffee and peanuts. Women provide the majority of agricultural labor, and with the time saved by this machine, would have the opportunity to dedicate themselves to other obligations. Collection of firewood, a chore often left to children, can be greatly reduced by the simple processing of shelled peanut hulls into fuel briquette.

== Awards ==
- MIT Ideas (2006)
- Popular Mechanics Magazine – Breakthrough Award (2006)
- Carolina Challenge – Business Plan
- CNN Heroes – Jock Brandis (2008)
- Tech Awards Laureate (2008)
- Purpose Prize – Jock Brandis (2008)

== See also ==
- Appropriate technology
