= Appropriate technology =

Concept in the philosophy and politics of technology

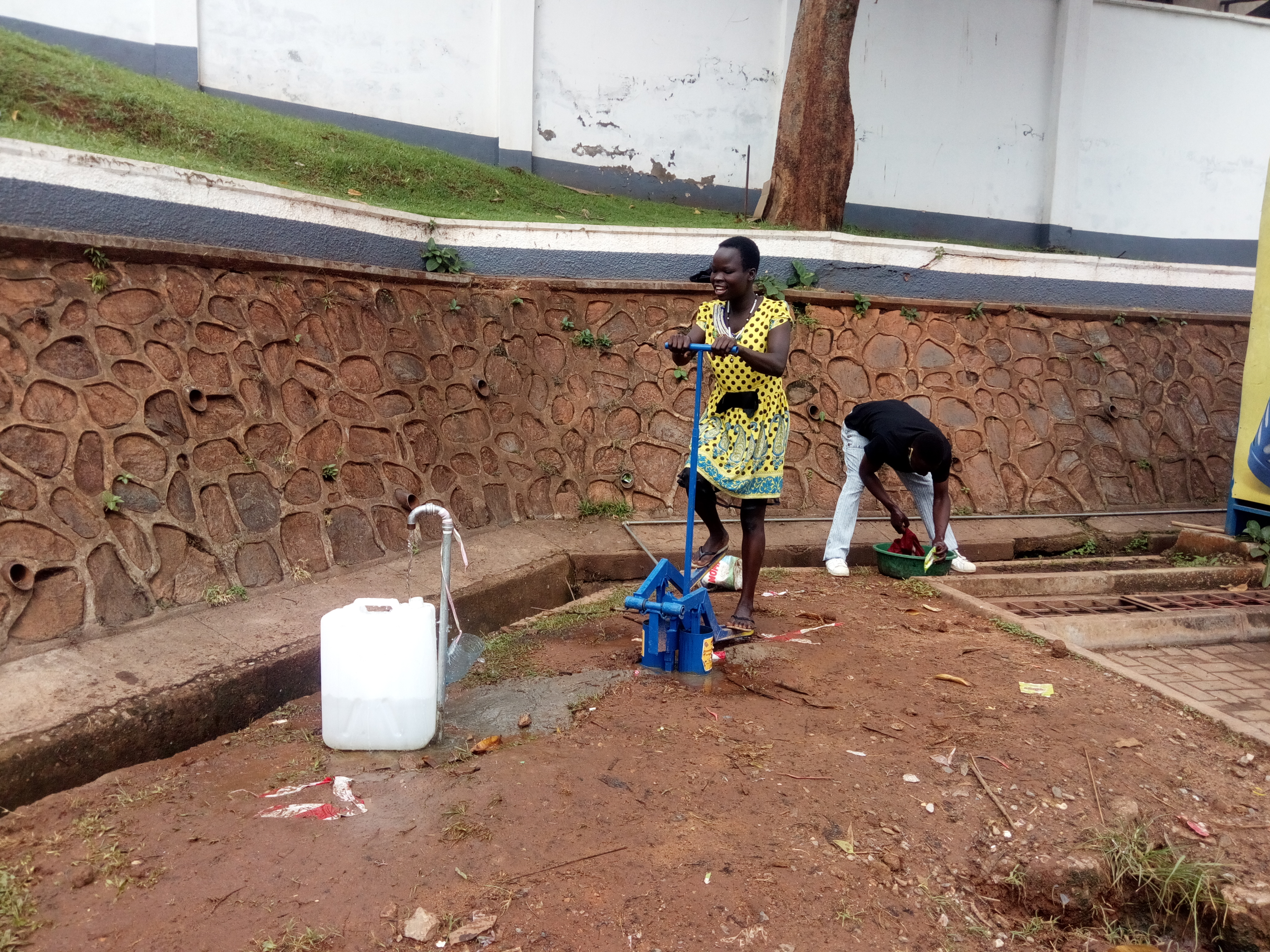
Pedal-powered water pump in Uganda

Appropriate technology is a movement (and its manifestations) encompassing technological choice and application that is small-scale, affordable by its users, labor-intensive, energy-efficient, environmentally sustainable, and locally autonomous. It was originally articulated as intermediate technology by the economist Ernst Friedrich "Fritz" Schumacher in his work Small Is Beautiful. Both Schumacher and many modern-day proponents of appropriate technology also emphasize the technology as people-centered.

Appropriate technology has been used to address issues in a wide range of fields. Well-known examples of appropriate technology applications include: bike- and hand-powered water pumps (and other self-powered equipment), the bicycle, the universal nut sheller, self-contained solar lamps and streetlights, and passive solar building designs. Today appropriate technology is often developed using open source principles, which have led to open-source appropriate technology (OSAT) and thus many of the plans of the technology can be freely found on the Internet. OSAT has been proposed as a new model of enabling innovation for sustainable development.

Appropriate technology is most commonly discussed in its relationship to economic development and as an alternative to technology transfer of more capital-intensive technology from industrialized nations to developing countries. However, appropriate technology movements can be found in both developing and developed countries. In developed countries, the appropriate technology movement grew out of the energy crisis of the 1970s and focuses mainly on environmental and sustainability issues. Today the idea is multifaceted; in some contexts, appropriate technology can be described as the simplest level of technology that can achieve the intended purpose, whereas in others, it can refer to engineering that takes adequate consideration of social and environmental ramifications. The facets are connected through robustness and sustainable living.

== History ==
=== Predecessors ===
Indian ideological leader Mahatma Gandhi is often cited as the "father" of the appropriate technology movement. Though the concept had not been given a name, Gandhi advocated for small, local and predominantly village-based technology to help India's villages become self-reliant. He disagreed with the idea of technology that benefited a minority of people at the expense of the majority or that put people out of work to increase profit. In 1925 Gandhi founded the All-India Spinners Association and in 1935 he retired from politics to form the All-India Village Industries Association. Both organizations focused on village-based technology similar to the future appropriate technology movement.

China also implemented policies similar to appropriate technology during the reign of Mao Zedong and the following Cultural Revolution. During the Cultural Revolution, development policies based on the idea of "walking on two legs" advocated the development of both large-scale factories and small-scale village industries.

=== E. F. Schumacher ===
Despite these early examples, Dr. Ernst Friedrich "Fritz" Schumacher is credited as the founder of the appropriate technology movement. A well-known economist, Schumacher worked for the British National Coal Board for more than 20 years, where he blamed the size of the industry's operations for its uncaring response to the harm black-lung disease inflicted on the miners. However it was his work with developing countries, such as India and Burma, which helped Schumacher form the underlying principles of appropriate technology.

Schumacher first articulated the idea of "intermediate technology," now known as appropriate technology, in a 1962 report to the Indian Planning Commission in which he described India as long in labor and short in capital, calling for an "intermediate industrial technology" that harnessed India's labor surplus. Schumacher had been developing the idea of intermediate technology for several years prior to the Planning Commission report. In 1955, following a stint as an economic advisor to the government of Burma, he published the short paper "Economics in a Buddhist Country," his first known critique of the effects of Western economics on developing countries. In addition to Buddhism, Schumacher also credited his ideas to Gandhi.

Initially, Schumacher's ideas were rejected by both the Indian government and leading development economists. Spurred to action over concern the idea of intermediate technology would languish, Schumacher, George McRobie, Mansur Hoda and Julia Porter brought together a group of approximately 20 people to form the Intermediate Technology Development Group (ITDG) in May 1965. Later that year, a Schumacher article published in The Observer garnered significant attention and support for the group. In 1967, the group published the Tools for Progress: A Guide to Small-scale Equipment for Rural Development and sold 7,000 copies. ITDG also formed panels of experts and practitioners around specific technological needs (such as building construction, energy and water) to develop intermediate technologies to address those needs. At a conference hosted by the ITDG in 1968 the term "intermediate technology" was discarded in favor of the term "appropriate technology" used today. Intermediate technology had been criticized as suggesting the technology was inferior to advanced (or high) technology and not including the social and political factors included in the concept put forth by the proponents. In 1973, Schumacher described the concept of appropriate technology to a mass audience in his influential work Small Is Beautiful: A Study of Economics As If People Mattered.

=== Growing trend ===
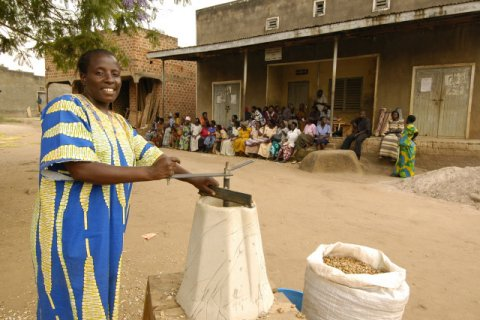
The universal nut sheller in use in Uganda, an example of appropriate technology

Between 1966 and 1975 the number of new appropriate technology organizations founded each year was three times greater than the previous nine years. There was also an increase in organizations focusing on applying appropriate technology to the problems of industrialized nations, particularly issues related to energy and the environment. In 1977, the OECD identified in its Appropriate Technology Directory 680 organizations involved in the development and promotion of appropriate technology. By 1980, this number had grown to more than 1,000. International agencies and government departments were also emerging as major innovators in appropriate technology, indicating its progression from a small movement fighting against the established norms to a legitimate technological choice supported by the establishment. For example, the Inter-American Development Bank created a Committee for the Application of Intermediate Technology in 1976 and the World Health Organization established the Appropriate Technology for Health Program in 1977.

Appropriate technology was also increasingly applied in developed countries. For example, the energy crisis of the mid-1970s led to the creation of the National Center for Appropriate Technology (NCAT) in 1977 with an initial appropriation of 3 million dollars from the U.S. Congress. The Center sponsored appropriate technology demonstrations to "help low-income communities find better ways to do things that will improve the quality of life, and that will be doable with the skills and resources at hand." However, by 1981 the NCAT's funding agency, Community Services Administration, had been abolished. For several decades NCAT worked with the US departments of Energy and Agriculture on contract to develop appropriate technology programs. Since 2005, NCAT's informational web site is no longer funded by the US government.

=== Decline ===
In more recent years, the appropriate technology movement has continued to decline in prominence. The German Appropriate Technology Exchange (GATE) and the Netherlands' Technology Transfer for Development (TOOL) are examples of organizations no longer in operation. Recently, a study looked at the continued barriers to AT deployment despite the relatively low cost of transferring information in the internet age. The barriers have been identified as: AT seen as inferior or "poor person's" technology, technical transferability and robustness of AT, insufficient funding, weak institutional support, and the challenges of distance and time in tackling rural poverty.

A more free market-centric view has also begun to dominate the field. For example, Paul Polak, founder of International Development Enterprises (an organization that designs and manufactures products that follow the ideals of appropriate technology), declared appropriate technology dead in a 2010 blog post.

Polak argues the "design for the other 90 percent" movement has replaced appropriate technology. Growing out of the appropriate technology movement, designing for the other 90 percent advocates the creation of low-cost solutions for the 5.8 billion of the world's 6.8 billion population "who have little or no access to most of the products and services many of us take for granted."

Many of the ideas integral to appropriate technology can now be found in the increasingly popular "sustainable development" movement, which among many tenets advocates technological choice that meets human needs while preserving the environment for future generations. In 1983, the OECD published the results of an extensive survey of appropriate technology organizations titled, The World of Appropriate Technology, in which it defined appropriate technology as characterized by "low investment cost per work-place, low capital investment per unit of output, organizational simplicity, high adaptability to a particular social or cultural environment, sparing use of natural resources, low cost of final product or high potential for employment." Today, the OECD web site redirects from the "Glossary of Statistical Terms" entry on "appropriate technology" to "environmentally sound technologies." The United Nations' "Index to Economic and Social Development" also redirects from the "appropriate technology" entry to "sustainable development."

=== Potential resurgence ===
Despite the decline, several appropriate technology organizations are still in existence, including the ITDG which became Practical Action after a name change in 2005. Skat (Schweizerische Kontaktstelle für Angepasste Technology) adapted by becoming a private consultancy in 1998, though some Intermediate Technology activities are continued by Skat Foundation through the Rural Water Supply Network (RWSN). Another actor still very active is the charity CEAS (Centre Ecologique Albert Schweitzer). A pioneer in food transformation and solar heaters, it offers vocational training in West Africa and Madagascar. There is also currently a notable resurgence as viewed by the number of groups adopting open source appropriate technology (OSAT) because of the enabling technology of the Internet. These OSAT groups include: Akvo Foundation, Appropedia, The Appropriate Technology Collaborative, Catalytic Communities, Centre for Alternative Technology, Center For Development Alternatives, Engineers Without Borders, Low-tech Magazine, Open Source Ecology, Practical Action, and Village Earth. Most recently ASME, Engineers Without Borders (USA) and the IEEE have joined to produce Engineering for Change, which facilitates the development of affordable, locally appropriate and sustainable solutions to the most pressing humanitarian challenges.

== Terminology ==
Appropriate technology frequently serves as an umbrella term for a variety names for this type of technology. Frequently these terms are used interchangeably; however, the use of one term over another can indicate the specific focus, bias or agenda of the technological choice in question. Though the original name for the concept now known as appropriate technology, "intermediate technology" is now often considered a subset of appropriate technology that focuses on technology that is more productive than "inefficient" traditional technologies, but less costly than the technology of industrialized societies. Other types of technology under the appropriate technology umbrella include:

- Capital-saving technology
- Mid-tech
- Labor-intensive technology
- Alternate technology
- Self-help technology
- Village-level technology
- Community technology
- Progressive technology
- Indigenous technology
- People's technology
- Light-engineering technology
- Adaptive technology
- Light-capital technology
- Soft technology

A variety of competing definitions exist in academic literature and organization and government policy papers for each of these terms. However, the general consensus is appropriate technology encompasses the ideas represented by the above list. Furthermore, the use of one term over another in referring to an appropriate technology can indicate ideological bias or emphasis on particular economic or social variables. Some terms inherently emphasize the importance of increased employment and labor utilization (such as labor-intensive or capital-saving technology), while others may emphasize the importance of human development (such as self-help and people's technology).

It is also possible to distinguish between hard and soft technologies. According to Dr. Maurice Albertson and Audrey Faulkner, appropriate hard technology is "engineering techniques, physical structures, and machinery that meet a need defined by a community, and utilize the material at hand or readily available. It can be built, operated and maintained by the local people with very limited outside assistance (e.g., technical, material, or financial). it is usually related to an economic goal."

Albertson and Faulkner consider appropriate soft technology as technology that deals with "the social structures, human interactive processes, and motivation techniques. It is the structure and process for social participation and action by individuals and groups in analyzing situations, making choices and engaging in choice-implementing behaviors that bring about change."

A closely related concept is social technology, defined as "products, techniques and/or re-applicable methodologies developed in the interaction with the community and that must represent effective solution in terms of social transformation". Further, Kostakis et al. propose a mid-tech approach to distinguish between low-tech and hi-tech polarities. Inspired by E.F. Schumacher, they argue that mid-tech could be understood as an inclusive middle that may go beyond the two polarities, combining the efficiency and versatility of digital/automated technology with low-tech's potential for autonomy and resilience.

== Practitioners ==
Some of the well known practitioners of the appropriate technology sector include: B.V. Doshi, Buckminster Fuller, William Moyer (1933–2002), Amory Lovins, Sanoussi Diakité, Albert Bates, Victor Papanek, Giorgio Ceragioli (1930–2008), Frithjof Bergmann, Arne Næss, (1912–2009), Mansur Hoda, and Laurie Baker.

== Development ==
Schumacher's initial concept of intermediate technology was created as a critique of the currently prevailing development strategies which focused on maximizing aggregate economic growth through increases to overall measurements of a country's economy, such as gross domestic product (GDP). Developed countries became aware of the situation of developing countries during and in the years following World War II. Based on the continuing rise in income levels in Western countries since the Industrial Revolution, developed countries embarked on a campaign of massive transfers of capital and technology to developing countries in order to force a rapid industrialization intended to result in an economic "take-off" in the developing countries.

However, by the late 1960s it was becoming clear this development method had not worked as expected and a growing number of development experts and national policy makers were recognizing it as a potential cause of increasing poverty and income inequality in developing countries. In many countries, this influx of technology had increased the overall economic capacity of the country. However, it had created a dual or two-tiered economy with pronounced division between the classes. The foreign technology imports were only benefiting a small minority of urban elites. This was also increasing urbanization with the rural poor moving to urban cities in hope of more financial opportunities. The increased strain on urban infrastructures and public services led to "increasing squalor, severe impacts on public health and distortions in the social structure."

Appropriate technology was meant to address four problems: extreme poverty, starvation, unemployment and urban migration. Schumacher saw the main purpose for economic development programs was the eradication of extreme poverty and he saw a clear connection between mass unemployment and extreme poverty. Schumacher sought to shift development efforts from a bias towards urban areas and on increasing the output per laborer to focusing on rural areas (where a majority of the population still lived) and on increasing employment.

== In developed countries ==
The term appropriate technology is also used in developed nations to describe the use of technology and engineering that result in less negative impacts on the environment and society, i.e., technology should be both environmentally sustainable and socially appropriate. E. F. Schumacher asserts that such technology, described in the book Small Is Beautiful, tends to promote values such as health, beauty and permanence, in that order.

Often the type of appropriate technology that is used in developed countries is "appropriate and sustainable technology" (AST), appropriate technology that, besides being functional and relatively cheap (though often more expensive than true AT), is durable and employs renewable resources. AT does not include this (see Sustainable design).

== Applications ==
Appropriate technologies find many applications in building and construction, agriculture, water and sanitation, energy generation and uses, transportation, health care, food preparation and storage, information and communication technologies, as well as finance.

== Determining a sustainable approach ==
Features such as low cost, low usage of fossil fuels and use of locally available resources can give some advantages in terms of sustainability. For that reason, these technologies are sometimes used and promoted by advocates of sustainability and alternative technology.

Besides using natural, locally available resources (e.g., wood or adobe), waste materials imported from cities using conventional (and inefficient) waste management may be gathered and re-used to build a sustainable living environment. Use of these cities' waste material allows the gathering of a huge amount of building material at a low cost. When obtained, the materials may be recycled over and over in the own city/community, using the cradle to cradle design method. Locations where waste can be found include landfills, junkyards, on water surfaces and anywhere around towns or near highways. Organic waste that can be reused to fertilise plants can be found in sewages. Also, town districts and other places (e.g., cemeteries) that are subject of undergoing renovation or removal can be used for gathering materials as stone, concrete, or potassium.

== Related social movements ==
- Community-based economics
- Cosmopolitan localism
- Campus Center for Appropriate Technology (CCAT)
- National Center for Appropriate Technology
- Alternative propulsion
- Alternative technology
- DIY culture
- Eco-village
- Frugal innovation
- Jugaad
- Low technology
- Maker Movement
- Myth of Progress
- Open Source Appropriate Technology
- Permaculture
- Practical Action (charity formerly known as Intermediate Technology)
- Principles of Intelligent Urbanism
- Social entrepreneurship
- Sustainable development
- Tools for Conviviality
- Green syndicalism
- Lifehacking
- Small Is Beautiful
- The Appropriate Technology Collaborative

== See also ==
- Amish way of life § Use of modern technology
- Bush Pump
- Cradle to Cradle Design
- Critique of technology
- Deindustrialization
- List of environment topics
- Family planning
- No innovation without representation
- Old Order Mennonite
- Productivity improving technologies (historical)
- Schumacher Center for a New Economics
- Russian Mennonite
- Social innovation
- Source reduction
- Synthetic biology
- Technology and society
- Zero emission
- Whole Earth Catalog
