= Open-source appropriate technology =

Appropriate technology from the open-design movement

Open-source appropriate technology (OSAT) is appropriate technology developed through the principles of the open-design movement. Appropriate technology is technology designed with special consideration for the environmental, ethical, cultural, social, political, and economic aspects of the community it is intended for. Open design is public and licensed to allow it to be used, modified, and distributed freely.

== Benefits ==
Open source is a development method for appropriate technology that utilizes distributed peer review and transparency of the process.

- Open-source-appropriate technology has the potential to drive applied sustainability.
- The built-in continuous peer review can result in better quality, higher reliability, and more flexibility than conventional design or patenting of technologies.
- The accessible nature of the knowledge provides lower costs, particularly for those technologies that benefit little from the scale of manufacture.
- OSAT enables the end of predatory intellectual property lock-in. This is important for relieving suffering and saving lives in the developing world.

In an article published on Harvard Business Review, Vasilis Kostakis and Andreas Roos argue that the "open-source" model can act as a driver of sustainable development since it enables localization for communities that do not have the resources to tempt commercial developers to provide local versions of their products, minimizing the need to ship materials over long distances and organizing material activities accordingly. Local manufacturing would also make maintenance easier and encourage manufacturers to design products to last as long as possible. The technology can be both "gratis" and "libre," i.e., free of both the monetary cost and contractual restrictions often associated with commercial technologies and patents. That freedom can be an important consideration for developing communities. According to the concepts of Jeremy Rifkin, it thus optimizes the sharing of knowledge and design as there are no patent costs to pay for.

== Ethical considerations ==
For solutions, many researchers, companies, and academics work on products meant to assist sustainable development. The ethics of information sharing in this context have been explored in depth.

== Support in the literature ==
- It has been investigated how open sharing of designs, specifications, and technical information can enhance effectiveness, widespread use, and innovation of appropriate technology.
- OSAT has been proposed as a new model of enabling innovation for sustainable development.
- OSAT has been claimed to assist in development of medical technology particularly for the developing world.
- It has been claimed that the sharing of design processes, appropriate tools, and technical information enables more effective and rapid development of appropriate technologies for both industrialized and non-industrialized regions. In addition, it is claimed that this sharing will require the appropriate-technology community to adopt open standards/licenses, document knowledge, and build on previous work.
- OSAT can be used to generate renewable energy
- OSAT in ICT
- OSAT and peer production

== In education ==
The Appropedia Foundation is a non-profit organization running Appropedia, the largest wiki documenting schematics, ideas, observations, experimental data, deployment logs etc. about patent-free appropriate technology, permaculture and related subjects.

At the university level, the use of open-source-appropriate technology classroom projects has been shown to be successful in forging the connection between physics and social benefit. This approach has the potential to use students' access to resources and testing equipment in furthering the development of appropriate technology. Similarly, OSAT has been used for improving service learning. MIT studied the usefulness of appropriate technology in education and its relation to OSAT.

It has been proposed that the evolution of the open-source 3D printers can enable a new method of development for OSAT.

To create new and improved products factors a number of factors must be considered, such as fracture mechanics, ergonomics, and user centered design. In addition the use of smart materials like graphene maybe considered for overall improvement of the product.

== Evaluation ==
Appropriate technology is designed to promote decentralized, labor-intensive, energy-efficient and environmentally sound businesses. Carroll Pursell says that the movement declined from 1965 to 1985, due to an inability to counter advocates of agribusiness, large private utilities, and multinational construction companies. Recently (2011), several barriers to OSAT deployment have been identified:

- AT seen as inferior or "poor person's" technology
- Technical transferability and robustness of AT
- Insufficient funding
- Weak institutional support
- The challenges of distance and time in tackling rural poverty

== See also ==
- Applied sustainability
- Appropriate technology
- Engineering for Change
- Open design
- Open manufacturing
- Sustainable development
- Ethics of technology
- Open source technology
- Digital public goods
