= Engineers Without Borders (Ireland) =

Irish international development organization

Engineers Without Borders Ireland is an international development organisation for students and professionals from Ireland who share a common interest in sustainable development through engineering and appropriate technologies.

The organisation was initially founded in 2007, and partook in a two-week project in the Sonairte: The National Ecology Centre in Co. Meath, Ireland. After a lull in activities, a small group of engineers began discussions on reviving EWB-Ireland in 2009. These discussions led to the formation of EWB-Ireland's first ever national committee in January 2010. The committee is a small group of engineers from numerous disciplines, located throughout the country.

Currently, EWB-Ireland has branches in University College Dublin and Queen's University Belfast.
