= NCAT =

NCAT is an acronym for:

- National Center for Appropriate Technology, an American organisation dedicated to technology and sustainability
- National Center for Aviation Training, Wichita Area Technical College
- New South Wales Civil and Administrative Tribunal, an agency of the Government of New South Wales
- North Carolina A&T State University, a historically black university in Greensboro, North Carolina
- National Center for Asphalt Technology at Auburn University in Auburn, AL 86830
- Nigerian College of Aviation Technology higher education institute in Zaria, Kaduna State, Nigeria
- National Cultural Association of Taiwan, an organization in Taiwan
