= Applied sustainability =

Sustainability with social justice

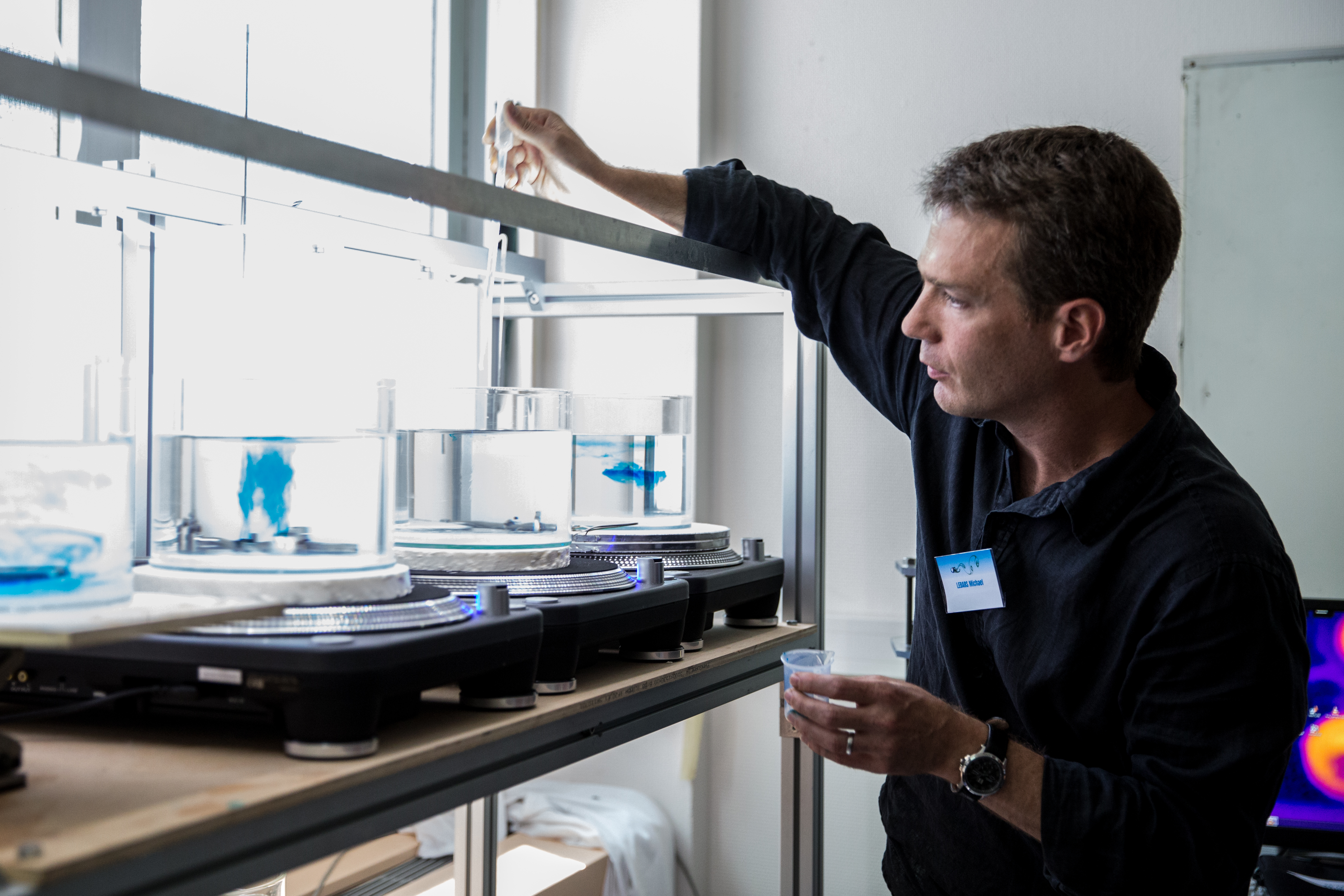
Lecture workshop showcasing fluid dynamics to be applied towards sustainable solutions.

Applied sustainability is the application of science and innovation, including the insights of the social sciences, to meet human needs while indefinitely preserving the life support systems of the planet.

Note that this is a significant difference from the standard definition of sustainability that normally is encapsulated by some version of the Brundtland Commission's concept: “development that meets the needs and aspirations of the present without compromising the ability of future generations to meet their own needs”

== Just applied sustainability ==
A more refined definition would be called "just applied sustainability": the just and equitable application of science and innovation, including the social sciences, to ensure a better quality of life for all, now and into the future whilst living within the limits of supporting ecosystems. This comes from the definition of Just Sustainability, which is "the egalitarian conception of sustainable development". It generates an improved definition of sustainable development as "the need to ensure a better quality of life for all, now and into the future, in a just and equitable manner, whilst living within the limits of supporting ecosystems". This new form of sustainable development prioritizes justice and equity, while maintaining the importance of the environment and the global life support system.

== Synonymous with applied science ==
The relationship between "applied sustainability" and sustainability (or sustainability science) is analogous to the relationship between applied science (engineering) and basic science. Whereas science is the effort to discover, understand, or to understand better, how the physical world works, with observable physical evidence as the basis of that understanding. Applied science is the application of knowledge from one or more natural scientific fields to solve practical problems.

== Sustainable engineering ==
Applied sustainability is essentially sustainable engineering – by utilizing natural laws and physical resources in order to design and implement materials, structures, machines, devices, systems, and processes that meets human need while preserving the environment forever. Applied sustainability is made up of work in engineering, policy, and education – whatever methods are necessary to conserve the world for our children. A recent study has shown that open source principles can be used to accelerate deployment of sustainable technologies such as open source appropriate technologies.

== Clarification regarding terminology ==
Sustainability, itself, is a term that is often confused because in its most basic form it is a characteristic of a process or state that can be maintained at a certain level indefinitely. When used in the context of development, as sustainable development, it is a pattern of resource use that aims to meet human needs while preserving the environment so that these needs can be met not only in the present, but in the indefinite future. The most evolved definition of sustainability is that of just sustainability, proposed by Julian Agyeman – "the need to ensure a better quality of life for all, now and into the future, in a just and equitable manner, whilst living within the limits of supporting ecosystems".

== See also ==
- Circles of Sustainability
- Engaged Research
- Digital public goods
