= Mansur Hoda =

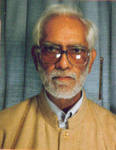
- Mansur Hoda
- Born: 22 April 1930; Chhapra, India
- Died: 10 February 2001 (aged 70); London
- Education: Aligarh Muslim University and Surrey University
- Occupation: Technologist

Mansur Hoda (1930–2001) was born in a middle-class Muslim family in the Indian city of Chhapra, Bihar. Mansur Hoda as a student, had worked as a research volunteer for the Intermediate Technology Group. After working for Indian Railways for ten years, he joined Bihar government as Inspector of Factories.

Mansur Hoda was greatly influenced by E. F. Schumacher of Small Is Beautiful fame. Mansur Hoda was absolutely convinced by the Schumacher's concept of intermediate technology or appropriate technology – something between the sickle and the combine harvester, the hoe and the tractor – as the only feasible solution to the problems of massive unemployment that haunted India and other developing countries.

In an article published in The Observer, E. F. Schumacher had strongly advocated for the "intermediate technologies" focusing on the need and skills possessed by the people of developing countries. He rejected the conventional aid policies which were based on transfer of modern large-scale technologies to poor countries lacking technical skills and mass market for them. This article aroused much interest and encouraged a few enthusiasts like George McRobie, Alfred Latham-Koenig and Mansur Hoda along with E. F Schumacher to create an advisory centre to promote the use of labour-intensive technologies. In 1966, the Intermediate Technology Development Group (ITDG) – now known as Practical Action – was born.

In 1968, along with his brother Surur Hoda, and helped by Schumacher, he formed the India Development Group UK, which runs rural development programmes in India with the help of the Indian business community in Britain.

In 1972, he left his higher studies MSc in Nuclear Science, Surrey University and a lucrative career to establish and run the Appropriate Technology unit at the Gandhian Institute in Varanasi, India on request of Jayaprakash Narayan, the leading Gandhian in India. During his visit to India Development Group, UK, Jayaprakash Narayan met Mansur Hoda and persuaded him to return to India and carry out the work, which could help millions of poor Indians. Schumacher travelled with him to deliver a series of lectures. 1976, encourage with responses, an enlarged unit was established in Lucknow and named Appropriate Technology Development Association,(ATDA) with Mansur Hoda as its first director.

It worked on improving and inventing number of rural and green technologies, including cotton spinning, renewable energy (solar cooker and biogas) and cycle rickshaw transport. Development of improved mini sugar factories, and an efficient 20-ton-a-day cement plant, using local raw material and making high-quality Portland cement brought international fame.

Mansur Hoda was a strong advocate of "Production by masses instead of Mass Production". In his address to the International Conference on the Indian Government's document, Approach to the Five Year Plan 1974–79, held at the Imperial College, London, Mansur Hoda pointed out, "Development does not only mean increased production of goods- but also the development of people – the stimulation of their innate abilities, giving them a feeling of self-determination, self-respect, self-reliance and enthusiasm. Unless people are involved in the process of development and are given a chance to do something worthwhile, to grasp new ideas, acquire new skills and develop a sense of their own worth, no society can move out of misery and poverty"

"Indeed, development is almost a meaningless word when a large percentage of the population can neither contribute to the nation's progress nor benefit from it".

In 1983, Mansur Hoda help set up the Gandhi Foundation in London. He returned to India to set up the Schumacher Institute of Appropriate Technology (SIAT) in Lucknow. This institute trained young villagers in micro enterprises and rural skills. It included repairing of farm equipment, pumps, and scooters. It also contributed to health sector by training for primary healthcare. Under Mansur, SIAT also pioneered in the education and development of entrepreneurial skills of specially women and girls to make them financially independent. This work continues to be supported by British and European Union aid.

== Books ==
Problems of Unemployment in India India Development Group
