= No innovation without representation =

Ideal

No innovation without representation is a democratic ideal of ensuring that everyone involved gets a chance to be represented fairly in technological developments. Political philosopher of technology Langdon Winner states that groups and social interests likely to be affected by a particular kind of technological change ought to be represented at an early stage in defining exactly what that technology will be. It is the idea that relevant parties have a say in technological developments and are not left in the dark. It has been spoken about by political scientist Massimiano Bucchi. This ideal does not require the public to become experts on the topics of science and engineering, it only asks that the opinions and ideas be heard before making drastic decisions, as talked about by Steven L. Goldman.

== Arguments for no innovation without representation ==
Arguments for no innovation without representation stated by Carl Mitcham:

1. Experts cannot escape public influence. There will always be influence from corporations or outside sources. "Technoscientific decision making is never neutral or objective."
2. Public participation will have a more beneficial long-term effect than no participation. "Without public participation nothing will get done"
3. Experts promote their own self-interest at the expense of the public. Justification of modern technology is that it is designed to promote human welfare.
4. Those that are affected by technological decisions should have a say in what affects them.
5. Moral autonomy is necessary. This is when "persons find their moral agency abridged when decisions that affect their lives are made heteronomously by others."
6. Public participation will lead to better outcomes. The idea that the majority will make the decision that has the most positive impact on technology or themselves.
7. Education through participation is necessary. Individuals will only become more intelligent through participation.
8. Currently there is a lack of strong moral consensus. People have different feelings and different opinions and participation of a greater population will have the greatest positive effect on society.

== Examples of when innovation without representation was unnecessary ==
Not all technology needs equal structural influence. Giving weight to the fact that one should not have to defend every decision they make to a large committee or formalized group (“Every time someone is moved to buy a fork or to sell a pencil sharpener"), it would be a distraction from important technological advances, as well as a misuse of resources, to poll everyone involved. Technology that is already developed without controversy is part of our social principle and not something where it is democratically necessary to go about evaluation for use in general life. The primary consideration of democratic innovation is for those instances that affect a large level and hold influences beyond ethnic value.

"Rule by democratic elites is more democratic than thick democratic participation – in the sense that it is more likely, at least in theory, to protect civil liberties and minority rights." A great example is that the American Bill of Rights was developed by a group of experts who were looking out for the common goal of the majority population. A participatory democracy involving the consideration and opinions of everyone involved could have taken years to implement.

== Examples of when it was implemented ==
In 1970, Northwest Canada was found to have an abundance of natural gas. Rather than allowing pipelines to be built with no regard to the Indigenous peoples living there, the Canadian Supreme Court justice Thomas Burger, arranged community hearings. These hearings took place to allow both investors of the pipeline as well as the Indigenous people who would be directly affected by its construction to come forward with their concerns and evidence for their reasonings. The judge believed that everyone's point should be respectfully considered, and to further prove this he arranged over 30 meetings in remote settings and provided transportation to those interested in attending. In addition, media radio coverage was provided in French, English, and Native languages, which allowed people to understand multiple sides of concerns and the process that was taking place. Ultimately it was decided to reroute the pipeline to follow existing highways rather than cutting through Native lands.

== Future changes ==
According to Richard Sclove, there are two main reasons for why the democratic system will be most effective when cultural pluralism is seen as an important factor in community success. "First, equal respect for people entails respecting their cultural heritage. To undermine a culture corrodes the social bases of its members’ sense of self and purpose. Second, all people share an interest in living in a society and a world comprised of many cultures."

== See also ==
- Amish life in the modern world § Use of modern technology
- Appropriate technology
