= Maurice L. Albertson =

- Born: Maurice Lee Albertson; August 30, 1918; Hays, Kansas, U.S.
- Died: January 11, 2009 (aged 90); Fort Collins, Colorado, U.S.
- Education: Iowa State University (BS, 1941); University of Iowa (MS, 1942; PhD, 1948)
- Known for: Co-founding the Peace Corps, Diffusion of submerged jets, International development education
- Title: Professor Emeritus, Colorado State University
- Awards: ASCE Norman Medal (1950); Peace Corps Paul Rice Award
- Scientific career
- Fields: Civil engineering, Fluid mechanics, International development
- Workplaces: Colorado State University

Maurice Lee "Quickshot" Albertson (August 30, 1918 – January 11, 2009), was a civil engineer, a teacher of water resources management over a long career (starting in 1947) at Colorado State University in Fort Collins, Colorado and former head of the Colorado State University Research Foundation.

== Biography ==
He was born and grew up in Hays, Kansas. There he learned from his father about helping others in a rural environment and living a life based on the Sermon on the Mount. Having witnessed economic hardship at the time of the Great Depression and seeing the effect of prolonged drought, he was inspired to focus on water resources. Albertson eventually headed all research projects at CSU. He received a B.S. degree at Iowa State University, an M.S. and Ph.D. degrees in mechanics and hydraulics at the University of Iowa, and a D.Phys.Sc. degree at the University of Grenoble, France. His first wife, Dolly (Myrtle Marie Campbell originally of Waterloo, IA), the mother of his two daughters, Kay and Sarah, died in 1976. His second wife, Audrey Faulkner, who survived him, is co-author on some of his publications.

Albertson has been credited with changing the face of U.S. volunteerism. He recalled that the phone rang at two o'clock in the morning in 1961, and that when he answered he found himself talking to Sargent Shriver, first director of the Peace Corps. Shriver was calling to ask him about a CSURF study on creating a youth volunteer group. Shriver apologized for the hour, but said he'd been working on the program all night and had worked his way to Albertson on his list of people to call. He wanted Albertson to come to Washington immediately. The CSURF research Albertson oversaw was used in setting up the Peace Corps. The Peace Corps remained true to the original vision in Albertson's opinion.

Albertson served as a consultant to the World Bank, the United Nations Development Programme, USAID, UNESCO, and other agencies. His focuses have included water resource development, environmental engineering, water and sanitation, on-farm water management, village development, appropriate technology, and small industry development. Climate change has recently been one of his concerns.[4] His honors include: American Society of Civil Engineers, J. C. Stevens Award; Emil Hilgard Prize; Croes Medal; CSU Centennial Professor and Public Service Award; Peshawar University of Pakistan, Honorary Doctor of Laws; Asian Institute of Technology, Honorary Doctor of Technology; Honorary Doctor of Humane Letters, Lowell University; Colorado Governor’s Award of Merit for Science and Technology; honorary doctorate from Colorado State University; National Society of Professional Engineers Engineer of the Year; Iowa State University Professional Achievement Award. Albertson also received the E-chievement Award from etown, a weekly NPR radio broadcast. The award honors noteworthy individuals who are working hard to make a positive difference in their communities and beyond. He was president and co-founder of Village Earth, the Consortium for Sustainable Village-Based Development, and worked almost until the moment of his death on plans for the organization. He has more than 200 publications. He was honored in the U.S. Senate on the occasion of his 90th birthday.

== See also ==
- Appropriate Technology
- Local food
- Sustainable agriculture
- Sustainable food system
- Volunteerism
- Civil engineering
- Peace Corps
- Colorado State University
- Water resources
- Land-grant universities
- Village Earth
