= Death Bed: The Bed That Eats =

1977 film

- Official Cult Epics Blu-ray artwork, 2013
- Directed by: George Barry
- Written by: George Barry
- Produced by: George Barry; Maureen Petrucci
- Starring: Demene Hall; William Russ; Dave Marsh
- Cinematography: Robert Fresco
- Edited by: Ron Medico
- Music by: Mike McCoy (original cut); Cyclobe (2003 release)
- Distributed by: Cult Epics (home media)
- Release date: February 15, 2003 (IndieFest)
- Running time: 77 minutes
- Country: United States
- Language: English
- Budget: $30,000

Death Bed: The Bed That Eats is a 1977 American surrealist folk horror film written, produced, and directed by George Barry in his only feature film, and starring Demene Hall, William Russ, Julie Ritter, and Dave Marsh. The plot centers on a demon-possessed bed that is passed on through generations, bringing tragedy upon those who come across it.

Filmed in Detroit in the early 1970s on a budget of $30,000, Death Bed underwent approximately four years' worth of post-production by Barry, and did not receive distribution upon completion. Despite this, the film garnered a minor cult following in Europe after it was made available via bootlegged VHS editions, initially through the United Kingdom-based label Portland Films. Barry was unaware of these unofficial releases until 2001 when he came across a review of the film on an online forum.

The film was championed by British film critic, writer, and musician Stephen Thrower, whose musical group, Cyclobe, composed a new musical theme for the film with Barry's approval. Cyclobe's music was integrated into the film before it had its first official theatrical premiere at the San Francisco Independent Film Festival in February 2003. The U.S. home media label Cult Epics released the film on DVD the same year, and a Blu-ray edition followed in 2013.

== Plot ==
In 1897, a demon fell in love with a woman and conjured up a bed on which to make love to her. The woman died during the act, and, in his grief, the demon wept tears of blood which fell on the bed and brought it to life. When the demon is awake, the bed's evil runs rampant as it physically eats human beings. Every ten years, when the demon sleeps, it is left dormant until it wakes once more. Only one man, an artist identified as Aubrey Beardsley, was spared, as the bed condemned him to immortality behind a painting, where he must forever witness the bed taking victims. The bed passed from owner to owner until the present day, and consumes a series of victims in divided vignettes:

Breakfast

A young couple trespass into the abandoned mansion where the bed is housed. They make love on the bed, and the bed devours them. The artist mocks the bed for its stupidity. Enraged, the bed telekinetically destroys most of the house except for the room it is in.

Lunch

Three women—Diane, Sharon, and Suzan—discover the remnants of the now-destroyed house while traveling in the countryside. The bed strangles Suzan with her crucifix necklace before devouring her, but reacts to one of the other women by bleeding in agony. The artist realizes that the bed reacts with pain to the woman because she resembles its "mother" (the woman whose death caused the bed's creation). Elsewhere, Suzan's brother goes out looking for her.

Dinner

One of the two remaining women sleeps on the bed. She wakes as the bed begins eating her, but as she tries to escape, the bed snares her in its sheets and drags her back to be eaten. The last woman unsuccessfully tries to save her. The brother locates the surviving woman, only to have the bed trap them both. The brother attempts to rescue the previously eaten woman, only to have his hands eaten to the bone by the bed.

Just Desserts

The demon that created the bed falls asleep, which renders the bed powerless and allows the artist to communicate with the woman. The artist describes a ritual that will destroy the bed. The woman carries out the ritual, which teleports the bed out of the room and revives the bed's real "mother," but at the cost of killing the surviving woman. The bed's mother completes the ritual by having sex with the brother, causing the bed to burst into flames and die, allowing the artist to finally pass on.

== Cast ==
- Demene Hall as Diane
- William Russ as Sharon's Brother
- Julie Ritter as Suzan
- Linda Bond as The Resurrected
- Rosa Luxemburg as Sharon
- Dave Marsh as the Artist
  - Patrick Spence-Thomas as voice of the Artist
- Ed Oldani as First Male Victim
- Dessa Stone as First Female Victim
- Samir Eid as Gangster
- Fred Abdenour as Gangster
- Jock Brandis as The Priest
  - Ron Medico as voice of The Priest

== Production ==
=== Development ===
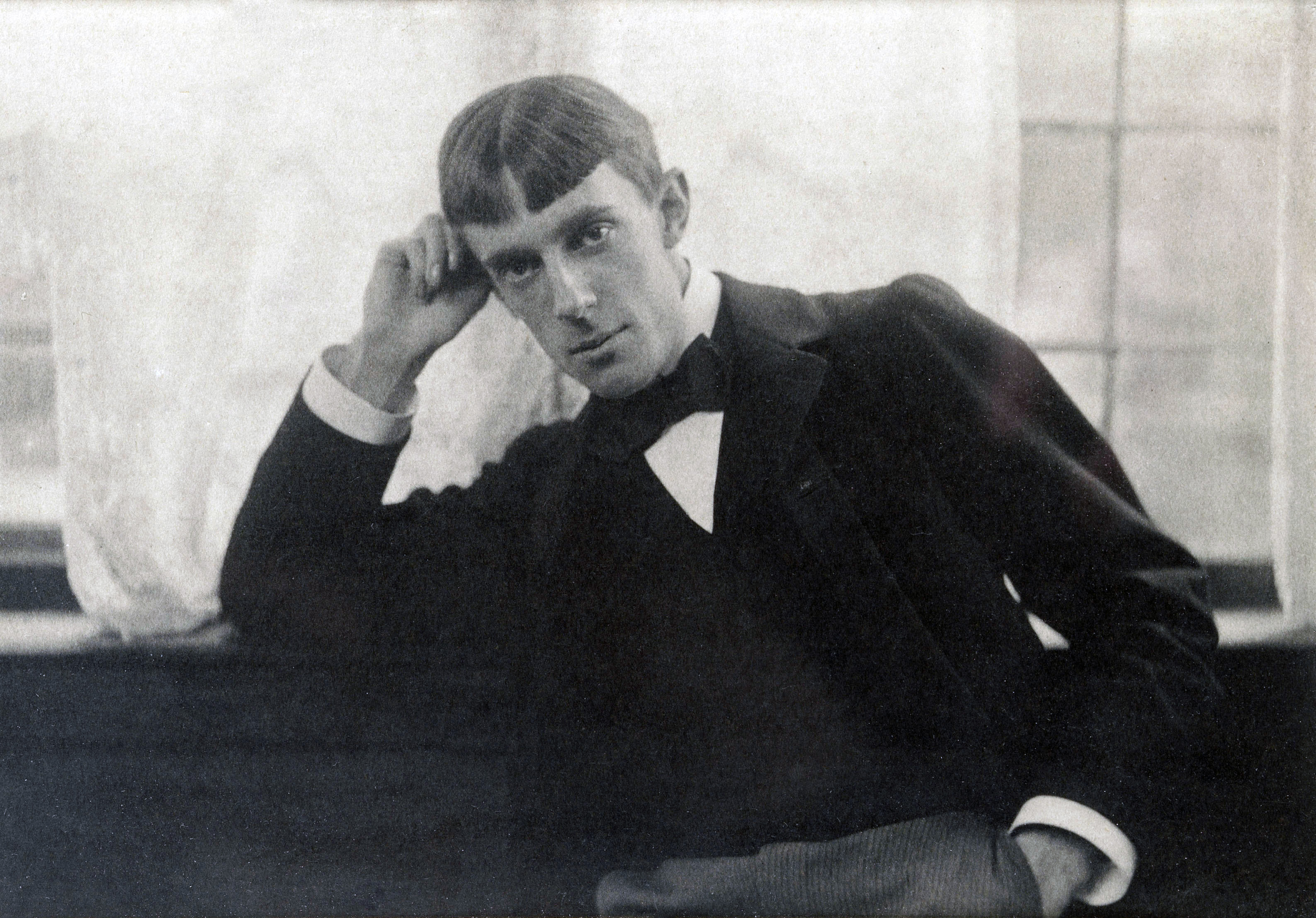
The film depicts the spirit of artist Aubrey Beardsley, who is spared by the bed and damned to oversee it from behind a painting

Writer-director George Barry, a native of Royal Oak, Michigan, based the idea for the film on a nightmare he had about a bed consuming human beings. Recounting the dream, Barry said: "I don't even remember if I was the subject of the dream or if I was an observer, but it was just this bed that was engulfing. There was nothing that I remember that was specific, but it was the engulfing bed. There wasn't any digestion; it was just the bed coming in, over. I wrote from there." Barry has said he was inspired by exploitation filmmakers such as Roger Corman and Jack Smith, as well as European arthouse films shown at local drive-in theaters.

The film depicts the spirit of the visual artist Aubrey Beardsley as a character (credited as "the Artist") damned to bear witness to the bed's devouring of humans from behind a painting. Barry characterized Beardsley's inclusion in the film as not literal, but rather "sort of like Beardsley by way of having a dream about Beardsley. If you dreamt about Beardsley in a dream, and he was riding a bicycle and selling you soft drinks—that's the Aubrey Beardsley that's in the movie."

=== Casting ===
Dave Marsh, a journalist and editor of Creem magazine, appears in the film as the Artist. Barry's grandmother appears briefly in the film in a flashback sequence as one of the bed's victims throughout the decades since its genesis. In the primary role of Diane, Barry cast Demene Hall, a film and stage actress who later went on to have a long-running career in theater productions in Seattle.

=== Filming ===
The film was shot in and around Detroit, Michigan in 1972 on a budget of $30,000. To avoid paying union fees, many of the cast and crew members were hired from Canada. Among them were Canadian cinematographer and documentary filmmaker Robert Fresco, who later worked as a camera operator on Prom Night (1980). Some filming took place at the historic Gar Wood Mansion on Grayhaven Island, which was leased for the production from a rock music group who was staying in the home. The sequences filmed in the stone chamber room where the bed is contained were shot in a makeshift studio.

After the principal photography, a process completed within two weeks, Barry spent four subsequent years editing the film. A mural by the English occultist Austin Osman Spare appears in the film.

== Release ==
=== Availability ===
Following the film's completion in 1977, Barry sought a theatrical release for Death Bed but failed to find a willing distributor. Later on, Barry received an offer from a Los Angeles-based distributor to release the film on VHS in the United Kingdom, after they had seen Barry's answer print of the film. The distributor offered to pay Barry $1,000 for a VHS release if he could supply them with a print of the film, complete with credits. Barry, unable to afford the $3,000 that credits would have cost, declined, and the print was sent back to him. Despite this, Portland Films, an obscure British label, released a bootleg VHS of the film in the United Kingdom circa 1983 without Barry's knowledge, with the film eventually receiving further VHS releases in Australia, New Zealand and Spain. The film garnered an underground cult following in Europe due to this release. The Spanish release is dubbed into Spanish and is considered quite rare.

Despite its pirated VHS releases outside of the United States, Barry remained unaware that the film had received any sort of release until 2001, when he discovered a forum post about the film by French film journalist Jean-Claude Michel on the website "Scarlet Street." This led to interviews with Barry by Daniel Craddock, who had written a review of the film, and, in turn, author Stephen Thrower, for his book Nightmare USA (2007).

The film was given its first official theatrical exhibition on February 15, 2003 at the San Francisco Independent Film Festival. For this release, Barry incorporated new theme music to the opening and closing credits, performed by Thrower's band Cyclobe, as he was never satisfied with the original theme composed by Mike McCoy.

=== Home media ===
Following Barry's discovery of the film's bootlegged releases, Death Bed received its first official home media release in the United States in 2003, through the independent home media distributor Cult Epics. In 2013, they released the film for the first time on Blu-ray, which included a new HD transfer of the film, as well as both the original mono and new 5.1 soundtracks. Also included was a new introduction by Thrower (in addition to the original one by Barry from the DVD release), an audio commentary with both Thrower and Barry, a conversation between the two, a behind-the-scenes featurette, and the original musical theme by Mike McCoy.

== Reception ==
Death Bed has received little attention from mainstream critics due to its lack of distribution. Reactions to the film during its first official release have been mixed to positive, with some characterizing it as "so bad it's good", highlighting its inherent oddness, along with its surreal and absurdist atmosphere; others have criticized these same merits along with its lack of characterizations and pacing. Dennis Harvey from Variety wrote, "Death Bed is a horror flick destined for some small place in the hearts of psychotronic fans who already treasure such extreme oddities as Blood Freak, not to mention Andy Milligan's entire ouevre." Barry Meyer from Film Monthly gave the film a slightly positive review, writing, "Death Bed is such a true original that you have to overlook all its faults and just go with it and enjoy this whimsical drug induced nightmare." Brian J. Dillard from AllMovie called it "a major classic in the what-were-they-thinking school of horror".

Joseph A. Ziemba from Bleeding Skull! gave the film a positive review, stating that the film "goes toe to toe with Doris Wishman's A Night to Dismember as one of the most disconnected and impressive low budget horror films of all time." Ain't It Cool News liked the film, calling it "a nightmarish dream existence", and compared the film's oddness to Quentin Dupieux's Rubber. John Staton of StarNews referred to the film as an utterly enjoyable "Z-grade horror movie"; highlighting its acting, premise, story line, special effects, as comparable to camp classics like Troll 2, and Plan 9 from Outer Space.

HorrorNews.net gave the film a negative review, calling it "curious but nothing more than the kind of film that you'd see lumped together on a budget 50-title film set". Adam Tyner from DVD Talk criticized the film's erratic pacing, and minimal characterization. Tyner also wrote, "On the other hand, Death Bed wields a strange and unique charm that kept entrancing me even when I was bored stiff. I'll always take an interesting failure over some uninspired, by-the-numbers horror flick."

== Legacy ==
Death Bed has gained a minor cult following over the years and is now considered a cult classic. Death Bed has been included in multiple lists at various media outlets. In 2014, Paste Magazine ranked the film at #92 in its The 100 Best "B Movies" of All Time, summarizing, "This is one of those great, lost films that finally found its way onto DVD a few years ago and was embraced by bad movie lovers around the world." PopMatters placed the film at #2 in their list of The 10 Weirdest Horror Movies of All Time, calling it "too insane for words".

In October 2014, a stage adaptation by playwright Gwenyfar Rohler was held at the Halloween Horror Theatre Festival in Wilmington, North Carolina.

Comedian Patton Oswalt included a routine about the film on his 2007 album Werewolves and Lollipops, in which he erroneously refers to the film as Death Bed: The Bed That Eats People.

== Sources ==
- Albright, Brian (2012). Regional Horror Films, 1958-1990: A State-by-State Guide with Interviews. Jefferson, North Carolina: McFarland. ISBN 978-1-476-60042-0.
- The A.V. Club (2009). Inventory: 16 Films Featuring Manic Pixie Dream Girls, 10 Great Songs Nearly Ruined by Saxophone, and 100 More Obsessively Specific Pop-Culture Lists. New York City, New York: Simon and Schuster. ISBN 978-1-439-10989-2.
- Barry, George; Thrower, Stephen (2013). Death Bed: The Bed That Eats (Blu-ray audio commentary). Cult Epics.
- Olivier, Marc (2020). Household Horror: Cinematic Fear and the Secret Life of Everyday Objects. Bloomington, Indiana: Indiana University Press. ISBN 978-0-253-04659-8.
- Thrower, Stephen (2007). Nightmare USA. London, England: FAB Press. ISBN 978-1-903-25446-2.
