= Universal nut sheller =

Hand-operated machine capable of shelling peanuts

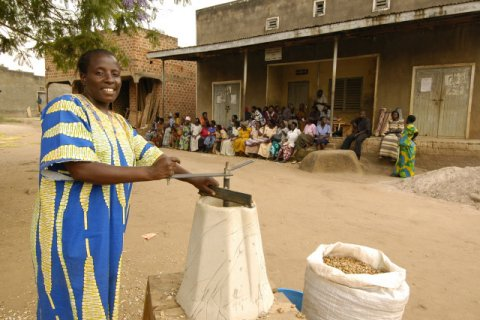
The Universal Nut sheller in Uganda, 2005

The universal nut sheller (UNS; formerly called the Malian peanut sheller) is a hand-operated machine capable of shelling raw peanuts.

It is made of concrete poured into two fibreglass molds, metal parts, one wrench, and any piece of rock or wood that can serve as a hammer. It accepts a wide range of nut sizes without adjustment. Operators can make necessary adjustments. The life expectancy of the machine is around 25 years.

The Full Belly Project is working to establish businesses that manufacture and distribute appropriate technologies such as the Universal Nut Sheller.

== History ==
In 2001, Jock Brandis traveled to Mali to fix a small village's water treatment system. While there he met a woman who informed him that it would be of great service to her village if he could find an affordable peanut sheller for them. Upon returning to the United States he contacted peanut authority Dr. Tim Williams of UGA, who told Brandis of a Bulgarian peanut shelling design. Jock adapted the design with help from a friend, Wes Perry. Jock went through several iterations of a redesign and one year later he completed the machine which is now called the Universal Nut Sheller.

In 2003, Brandis teamed up with a group of returned Peace Corps volunteers from Wilmington, North Carolina, to form the Full Belly Project, dedicated to designing and distributing unique appropriate technologies in developing countries.

== Operation ==
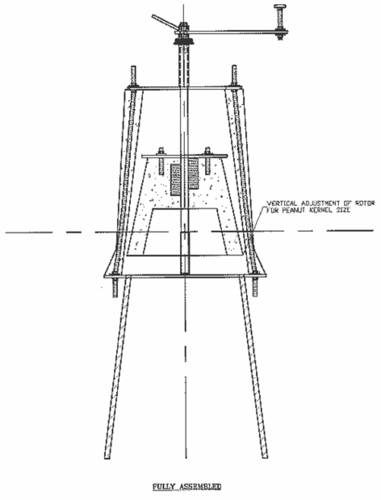
Diagram of the shelling machine

The user loads the desired crop in the space at the top. The user turns the handle, which rotates the rotor. This movement facilitates the nuts falling down the gradually narrowing gap. The shell of each nut is broken at the point where the gap is sufficiently narrow and the rotor motion causes sufficient friction to crack open the shell. The adjustable minimum width of the gap allows a range of nut sizes to be shelled. The kernels and shell fragments fall into a basket and are later separated by winnowing.

The Full Belly Project has developed a pedal powered agricultural processor, which places the universal nut sheller onto a pedaling chassis. In addition to the shelling method described, the pedaling apparatus is connected to a fan. The fan automatically winnows the harvest (separates the shells from the nuts). The pedal powered versions are capable of shelling the same variety of crops as the hand crank powered versions. The processor also provides access for the winnowing section to be used independently from the sheller. This allows winnowing of crops that are not shelled, including rice, maize, and sorghum.

== Problems ==
The Universal Nut Sheller proved incapable of shelling shea nuts in a manner useful for shea butter extraction for the shea nuts of Ghana. However, there are reports that it works for shea nuts from trees in Uganda.

== Awards ==
- 1st place - Popular Mechanics 2006 Breakthrough Awards.

== See also ==
- Food technology
- Sanoussi Diakité
