= Demene Hall =

American actress

- Born: November 4, 1949; Saginaw, Michigan, U.S.
- Died: June 27, 2018 (aged 68); Seattle, Washington, U.S.
- Occupation: Actress

Demene Hall (November 4, 1949—June 27, 2018) was an American actress. She is known for her performance in the 1977 horror film Death Bed: The Bed That Eats. In addition to her screen work, Hall was a prolific stage actress in the Seattle area for over several decades.

== Filmography ==
=== Film ===
Year	Title	Role	Notes	Ref.
1977	Death Bed: The Bed That Eats	Diane		
1983	My Brother's Wedding	Sister		
1993	The Temp	Marla Higgins		
2000	Men of Honor	Mrs. Biddle		
2006	Boy Culture	Zelma		
2009	Crimes of the Past	Judge Jonas		

=== Television ===
Year	Title	Role	Notes	Ref.
1992	Northern Exposure	Singer	Episode: "Heroes"	
1995	Under One Roof	Dr. Gavin	Pilot episode	
1997	Frasier	Conductor	Episode: "The 1000th Show"	
2014	Grimm	Miss Mary	Episode: "The Good Soldier"	
2015	Chaldea	Voidant	2 episodes	
