= Grassroots Support Organization =

Subset of INGOs

Grassroots Support Organizations (GSOs) are a specialized subset of Intermediate Non-Governmental Organizations (INGOs) that provides services and support to local groups of disadvantaged rural or urban households and individuals.

In its capacity as an intermediary institution, a GSO forges links between beneficiaries and the often remote levels of government, donor, and financial institutions. It may also provide services indirectly to other organizations that support the poor or perform coordinating or networking functions.

Martinez (2008) defines GSOs as development NGOs providing services and resources that enhance the capacity of impoverished communities and their organizations to build sustainable alternatives to their challenging life conditions.

== See also ==
- Village Earth
