= Practical Action =

UK-based charity

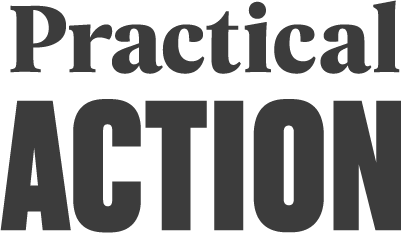
- Type: INGO
- Headquarters: The Robbins Building, Albert Street, Rugby, Warwickshire
- Location: UK
- Region served: International
- Website: practicalaction.org

Practical Action (previously known as the Intermediate Technology Development Group, ITDG) is a development charity registered in the United Kingdom which works directly in four regions of the developing world – Latin America, East Africa, Southern Africa and South Asia, with particular concentration on Peru, Bolivia, Kenya, Sudan, Zimbabwe, Bangladesh and Nepal.

In these countries, Practical Action works with poor communities to develop appropriate technologies in renewable energy, food production, agro-processing, water, sanitation, small enterprise development, building and shelter, climate change adaptation and disaster risk reduction.

== History ==
In 1965, economist and philosopher E. F. Schumacher had an article published in The Observer, pointing out the limitations of aid based on the transfer of large-scale technologies to developing countries which did not have the resources to accommodate them. He argued that there should be a shift in emphasis towards intermediate technologies based on the needs and skills possessed by the people of developing countries.

Schumacher and a few of his associates, including George McRobie, Julia Porter, Alfred Latham-Koenig and Professor Mansur Hoda, decided to create an "advisory centre" to promote the use of efficient labour-intensive techniques, and in 1966 the Intermediate Technology Development Group (ITDG) was born.

From its origins as a technical enquiry service, ITDG began to take a greater direct involvement in local projects. Following initial successes in farming, it developed working groups on energy, building materials and rural health, and soon grew to become an international organisation. The group now has seven regional offices, working on over 100 projects around the world, with a head office in the UK.

In July 2005, ITDG changed its working name to Practical Action, and since 2008 this has been its legal name. The organisation produces a triannual magazine entitled Small World.

== See also ==
- Small Is Beautiful – a book by Schumacher
- Tools for Self Reliance
