= Surur Hoda =

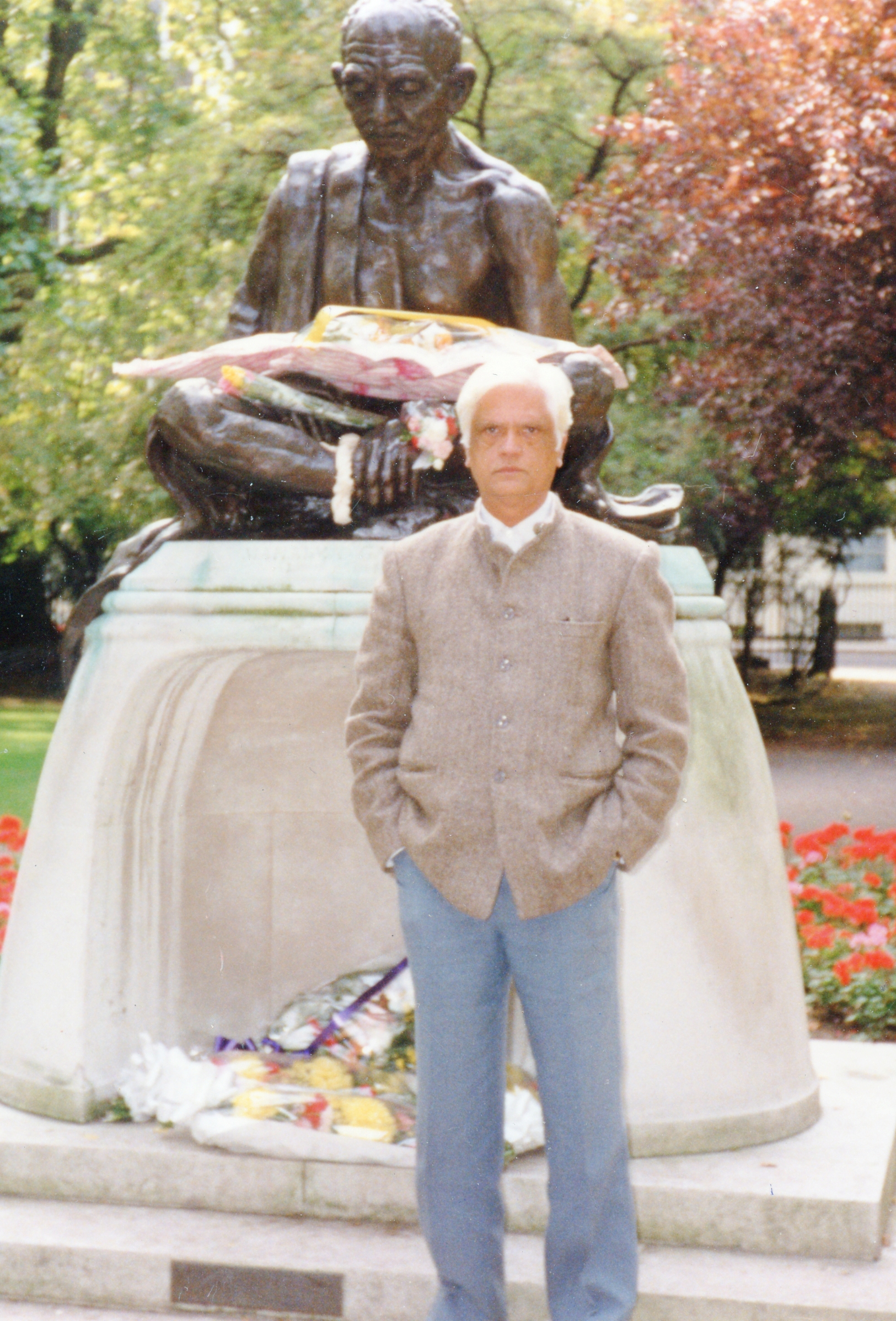
- Hoda in front of the Gandhi Statue in Tavistock Square, London
- Born: 5 May 1928; Chhapra, Bihar, India
- Died: 2 June 2003 (aged 75); London, UK
- Occupation: Socialist Leader

Surur Hoda (1928-2003), also known as M. S. Hoda, was a socialist, politician and trade unionist who believed in the ideals promoted by Mahatma Gandhi.

== Life ==
Hoda was born in Chhapra in India, on 5 May 1928 into a Muslim family. He obtained an engineering degree. He then worked in the railway industry and then became active in trade union affairs, to such an extent that he found it necessary to leave the country and move to London in 1962.

In the UK he was employed in the railways and civil aviation section of the International Transport Workers' Federation (ITF).

Hoda was also active in the Campaign for Nuclear Disarmament. He expressed his concern regarding the nuclear testing performed by India and Pakistan in 1998.

He was an associate of Jai Prakash Narayan, who had founded the Indian Socialist Party shortly after the independence. Hoda also enjoyed a long friendship with George Fernandes, who had been president of the All India Railway men's Federation before becoming the leader of Indian Socialist Party in the early 1970s. Surur Hoda was appointed as the Indian Socialist Party's European representative, and it was on that position he met many people. This was at the time when Mrs. Indira Gandhi imposed emergency rule in India. Jai Prakash Narayan was jailed by the then Indian prime minister Indira Gandhi during emergency’, Noel-Baker chaired Surur's Free JP campaign, which contributed to the effort to restore democracy in India. Many opposition politicians, including George Fernandes, were held in prison during emergency. Surur Hoda played an active part in mobilizing public opinions outside India against imposition of emergency and suspension of civil liberties in India.

In the early 1970s, he and his younger brother Mansur Hoda collaborated with E. F. Schumacher, the author of the best-selling book Small Is Beautiful, to set up the Appropriate Technology Development Association in India, together with George McRobie. This in turn, led to the creation of the Schumacher Institute for Appropriate Technology and Rural Development near Lucknow. Hoda worked as the chief Executive of the India Development Group and which sought both to raise funds for the Schumacher Institute and to promote the ideas of Fritz Schumacher regarding sustainable Intermediate Technologies.

He was involved in issues relating to Bihari refugees in Bangladesh. The birth of independent Bangladesh out of East Pakistan in 1971 led to many Bihari Pakistanis being stranded in the new state. Surur organized a delegation, headed by Ennals and Ben Whitaker, which contributed to nearly 200,000 refugees returning to Pakistan. Hoda also worked to promote Tibetan self-determination and the restoration of Fiji's democratic government.

In 1983 Hoda created the Gandhi Foundation in Britain. For services to community relations in Britain and to international human rights, Hoda was awarded the Order of the British Empire in 2000.

Hoda's association with the European Institute for Asian Studies is almost as old as the Institute itself. Although not quite a Founder member, he was admitted to membership at the very first meeting of Administrative Board. He was very active on issues relating to South Asia.

He was awarded the Videsh Samman in London on 15 August 2000 by the High Commissioner of India.

Richard Attenborough wrote that

There would have been no Gandhi Foundation without Surur Hoda. The very concept was his and indeed the inspiration for its creation was his. During the 20 years of our existence there have been both successes and crises. He has always been steadfast believing passionately in the advocacy of all that Gandhiji stood for. Everyone here today will miss him greatly. We all owe him an incalculable gratitude. I knew Surur well, both as a colleague and friend and I shall miss him during the rest of my life.

== Writings ==
- Schumacher on Gandhi – by Surur Hoda
