= Engineering for Change =

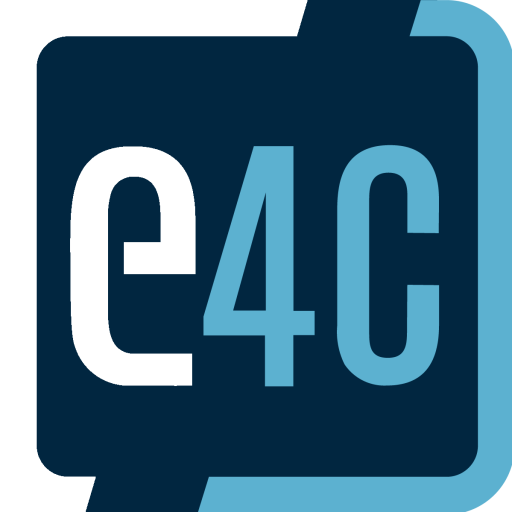
- Founded: 2009
- Founder: American Society of Mechanical Engineers, Institute of Electrical and Electronics Engineers, Engineers Without Borders
- Type: International development and education charity
- Purpose: International development, sustainable development, appropriate technology, open source, health, water, sanitation, architecture, aid, infrastructure and education
- Location: ASME headquarters, 2 Park Ave. New York City, U.S.
- Region served: International
- Method: Online collaboration and education
- Members: c. 70,000
- Key people: President Iana Aranda
- Employees: 11 staff, 200+ fellows
- Website: engineeringforchange.org

Engineering for Change (E4C) is an online platform and international community of engineers, scientists, non-governmental organizations, local community advocates and other innovators working to solve problems in sustainable global development. Their mission is to 'prepare, educate, and activate the international technical workforce to improve the quality of life of people and the planet.'

The organization's founding partners are the American Society of Mechanical Engineers, the Institute of Electrical and Electronics Engineers, and Engineers Without Borders USA. It is now under the umbrella of ASME's Engineering for Global Development program. Collaborators include Siemens Stiftung, The Level Market, Autodesk Foundation, Global Alliance for Clean Cookstoves, CAWST, WFEO, ITU, Institute of Food Technologists, and United Nations Major Group for Children and Youth. E4C facilitates the development of affordable, locally appropriate and sustainable solutions to the most pressing humanitarian challenges and shares them freely online as a form of open source appropriate technology.

Members of the E4C community use the platform's online tools to share knowledge, research global development issues, products and services, and deepen their professional development. The organization provides services through seven channels:

- The Solutions Library, a database of products that meet basic needs
- Monthly webinars and academic seminars
- Fellowship Program
- News and analysis
- Research in collaboration with external partners
- Online courses in global development engineering and design
- Jobs and volunteer opportunities board

Information about products and services fall into eight categories on the organization's Web site, and they can include big infrastructural projects such as community water purification and bridge building, or smaller, personal technologies such as bicycle-powered electricity generators and cellphone applications for healthcare.

== History ==
In 2009, the American Society of Mechanical Engineers created a website to pull together the disparate sources of information on appropriate technology and solutions in global development. The site aggregated information, hosted a library of often little-known technologies, and offered tools to enable collaboration among development teams worldwide. Throughout 2010, the site operated in alpha and then beta with a mostly closed group of users. A public site, at engineeringforchange.info, mirrored some of the content on the test site, but without all of its functionality. IEEE and EWB-USA signed on as partners in time for the public launch on January 4, 2011.

At present, the organization has more than 70,000 members and a social media following of more than one million.

== Fellowship Program ==
E4C trains and manages ~50 Fellows each year, working with businesses, universities, non-profits and government organizations around the world to improve their programs with technical expertise. Autodesk Foundation is an ongoing supporter of the fellowship, for example. Fellows research, optimize, and design projects that advance the United Nations' Sustainable Development Goals.

== Impact Projects ==
The organization trains and matches technical experts located in dozens of countries to support research, design and other short-term projects in collaboration with other organizations. Impact Projects fall into one of three categories: Design, Research or Workflows. E4C provides management, mentorship, training, and oversight through their Fellowship program.

== Solutions Library ==
The Solutions Library is a database of more than 1,000 products and services that meet basic needs in underserved communities. Entries are investigated and posted by the organization's staff and Fellows worldwide. The information on each entry is standardized to allow users to compare similar products to facilitate research and decision-making.

== Education ==
Education is an important part of Engineering for Change. The Web site provides educational webinars and research seminars, as well as news, analysis, expert opinion and materials on how to design and implement solutions.

== See also ==
- Appropriate technology
- Open source appropriate technology
