= Village Earth =

Village Earth: Consortium for Sustainable Village Based Development
- Founded: 1993
- Founders: Maurice L. Albertson; Edwin F. Shinn; Miriam Shinn
- Purpose: Rural and Indigenous Communities
- Location: Fort Collins, Colorado, US
- Region served: Worldwide
- Product: Appropriate Technology Library
- Method: Community-based Sustainable Development
- Website: villageearth.org

Village Earth: The Consortium for Sustainable Village-Based Development (CSVBD) DBA: Village Earth is a publicly supported 501(c)(3) non-profit, non-governmental organization (NGO) based in Fort Collins, Colorado, US. The organization works for the empowerment of rural and indigenous communities around the world with active projects with the Oglala Lakota on the Pine Ridge Indian Reservation in South Dakota, the Shipibo-Konibo of the Amazon region of Peru, India, Cambodia, and Guatemala. Village Earth is associated with the International Institute for Sustainable Development (IISD) at Colorado State University. Village Earth is also the publisher for The Appropriate Technology Library and The Appropriate Technology Sourcebook , a low-cost rural-development resource initiated by Volunteers in Asia in 1975 but transferred to Village Earth in 1995.

== Objectives ==
The roots of Village Earth's approach to community development grew from the reformist tradition of development which emerged in the 1970s as a reaction to liberal and neoliberal development policies which were blamed for increasing income gap and as well as increasing human migration from rural to urban areas around the globe. To address this situation, reformist approaches attempt to achieve greater equity, sustainability, and local self-reliance through an integrated multi-sector approach emphasizing the use of "appropriate technology" the creation of local participatory institutions.

While the roots of the Village Earth approach can be traced to reformist traditions of development, it combined many practices used in community development programs around the world in a new way. In particular these include:

1. A sustainable livelihoods approach which recognizes the multi-layered and interrelated survival strategies of rural families and communities and seeks to build on assets and eliminate underlying constraints through an ongoing process of participatory reflection and action.
2. The clustering and networking of local institutions to promote regional self-reliance without compromising local autonomy.
3. The development of multi-sector service centers to link local institutions to local, regional, and global resources.
4. The creation of mutual agreements and clarification of roles between internal and external activators (locals and outside community workers).

== Philosophy ==
Village Earth differs from many traditional development NGOs in the following ways:

1. At the heart of the Village Earth approach is the recognition that lack of access to resources, such as land, clean water and credit, is the fundamental issue faced by the majority of the world's poor. Ending global poverty is not as simple as just increasing people's income. Rather, to be sustainable, poverty alleviation programs must work to increase the fundamental rights of poor communities to access resources while building long-enduring and equitable institutions for their protection and management.
2. Influenced by the ideas and methods of Paulo Freire, Village Earth engages in a long-term dialog with communities to reveal and transform the underlying, and often inter-generational, causes of poverty. This approach differs from the approach used by many NGOs, which often define the problem, draft the proposal, and project a timeline prior to their engagement with communities.
3. Rather than focusing on problems impacting communities, Village Earth starts with a community's long-term vision for the future. According to the organization, if communities focus only on "fixing" problems, they may not actually be transforming the underlying structural contradictions causing their problems. By first clarifying a long-term and shared vision for the future, communities are free to imagine an entirely different future and begin working to create it . This principle goes against theories of development based on modernization which locate the concept of development in a continuum of progress, mostly based on Western cultural and economic concepts.
4. The necessity for the tandem use of appropriate hard and soft technology, a concept pioneered by Village Earth founder, Maurice L. Albertson. According to Albertson (1992) "It is the structure and process of social participation and action by individuals and groups in analyzing situations, making choices, and engaging in choice-implementing behaviors that bring about change. As with hard technology, the appropriate soft technology is related to the villages being able to organize, operate, and maintain the technology with a minimum of outside technical assistance (e.g., from professional social workers). It usually aims at changing the sociopolitical environment."

== Structure ==
Village Earth can be most closely classified within a specialized subset of Intermediate NGOs, referred to in the literature as "Grassroots Support Organizations" or GSOs. According to Carroll (1992): "A GSO is a civic development entity that provides services allied support to local groups of disadvantaged rural and urban households and individuals. In its capacity as an intermediate institution, a GSO forges links between beneficiaries and the often remote levels of government, donor and financial institutions. It may also provide services indirectly to other organizations that support the poor or perform coordinating or networking functions. It may also provide services indirectly to other organizations that support or perform coordinating or networking functions."

Village Earth advances its mission through the following means:

1. Providing grassroots support services to communities in the form of training, networking, research, and organizational sponsorship.
2. Training and consulting with other intermediate and resources organizations in our approach and methods.
3. Promoting the development and dissemination of appropriate technology information.

== History ==
The CSVBD was founded in 1993 as a result of a mandate on the part of participants at the International Conference on Sustainable Village-Based Development September 27-October 1, 1993, at Colorado State University. It was organized by Maurice L. Albertson, then president, Miriam Shinn, and Edwin F. Shinn, and attended by approximately 250 delegates from 40 different countries. The purpose of the conference was to find ways to cause sustainable-village-based development (SVBD) to occur in Third-World villages to help meet the needs of the world's rural poor.

The majority of those in attendance were from developing nations, and most of those individuals represented non-governmental organizations working in very grassroots and participatory projects around the world. More than 200 papers were submitted and formed five volumes of Proceedings. By the end of the conference it was agreed that the organizers should form a consortium made up of the participants. The purpose would be to launch several pilot projects, establish a newsletter to be sent to all conference participants and to find ways to make the proceedings generally available to attendees and the interested public. CSVBD was to serve as a sort of information hub for the different chapters, provide training in the methods discussed at the conference, provide monitoring and evaluation services and coordinate demonstration projects on the ground. According to Ed Shinn, "Perhaps one of the most important functions of [Village Earth] is to insure that the local NGO build teams with expertise in key development sectors that can interact with both the public and private sectors to secure needed resources."

The conference, as well as the roots of the Village Earth approach, were heavily influenced by Agenda 21 produced at the United Nations Earth Summit, held in Rio de Janeiro on June 14, 1992. In particular, its recognition that poverty is not the problem, rather, lack of access to resources is the primary obstacle to building a better life for the majority of the world's poor. As such, the Village Earth Approach was designed to transform the role of the NGO from being a service provider (health, irrigation, education, etc.) to functioning more as an "intermediary", working to mobilize village leadership and planning and from that, develop linkages to resources institutions such as governments, single sector NGO's, universities and the private sector. In development circles, an NGO that works in this capacity is referred to an "Intermediate" NGO.

== See also ==
- Bioregionalism
- Community-based economics
- Sustainable agriculture
- Rural community development
- Rural sociology
- Renewable resource
- Small Is Beautiful
- Swadeshi movement
