= Silver Bow County Poor Farm Hospital =

- U.S. National Register of Historic Places
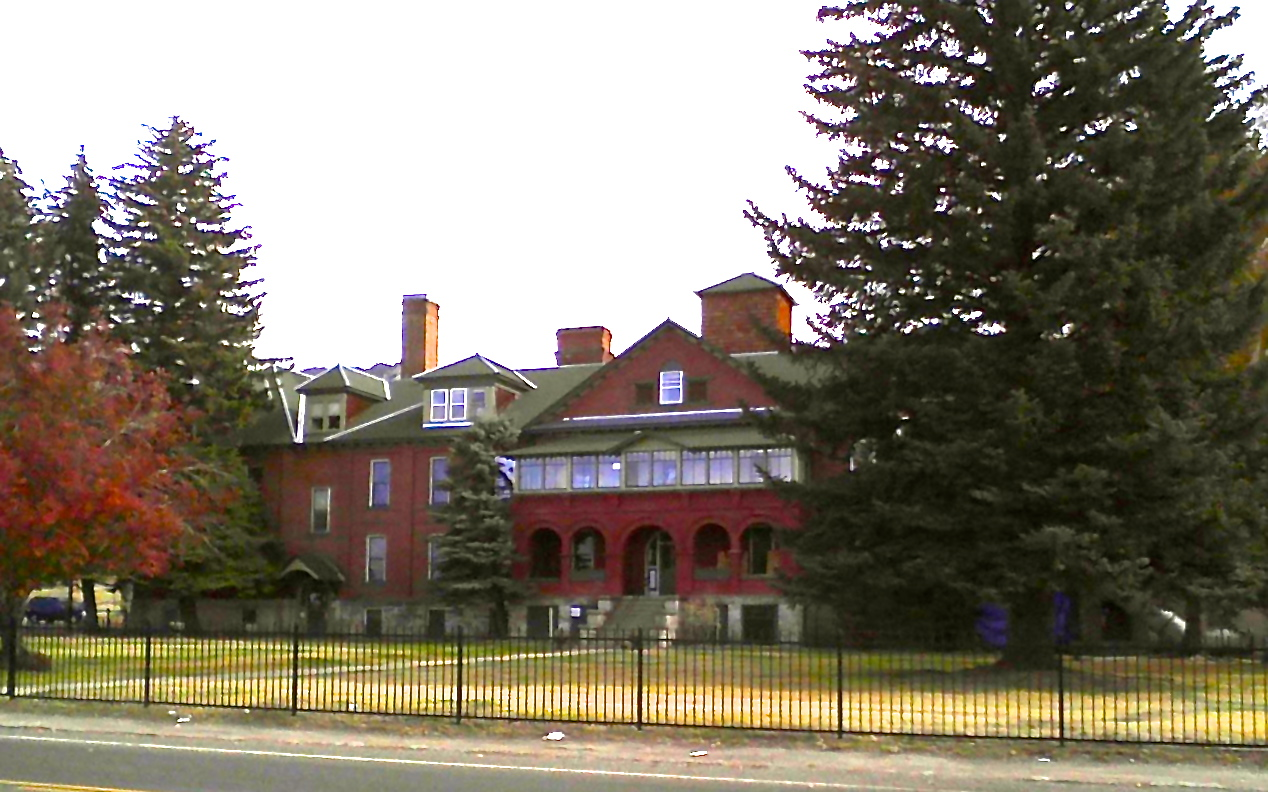

- Location within Montana Location within the United States
- Location: 3040 Continental Dr., Butte, Montana
- Coordinates: 45°59′4″N 112°29′9″W
- Area: 0.5 acres (0.20 ha)
- Built: 1902
- Architect: Charles S. Haire
- NRHP reference No.: 81000366
- Added to NRHP: July 16, 1981

The Silver Bow County Poor Farm Hospital at 3040 Continental Dr. in Butte, Montana was built in 1902. It includes design by architect Charles S. Haire. It was listed on the National Register of Historic Places in 1981.

It is now the headquarters building of the National Center for Appropriate Technology.
