= Akvo Foundation =

Not-for-profit internet and software development foundation

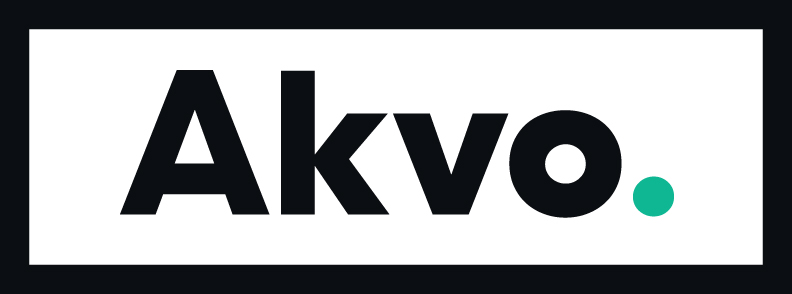
- Formation: October 2, 2008; 17 years ago
- Type: Nonprofit organisation
- Headquarters: Amsterdam, Netherlands
- Key people: Jeroen van der Sommen, Thomas Bjelkeman-Pettersson, Peter van der Linde, Kathelyne van der Berg
- Revenue: €5.4 million (2015)
- Staff: 95
- Website: https://akvo.org/

Akvo Foundation is a non-profit organization that develops internet and software systems, headquartered in Amsterdam, Netherlands. The foundation develops and maintains data collection and visualization systems for international development and aid programs. It began as a project under the Netherlands Water Partnership in 2006.

Akvo operates from eleven offices worldwide, including hub offices in Stockholm, London, Washington, DC, Nairobi, and New Delhi. As of 2017, Akvo operates in 93 countries and works with more than 1,800 organizations around the world (NGOs, national governments and multilateral aid organizations)

Akvo's tools are used to report, publish, monitor and evaluate works. Much of the foundation's work is concentrated within the water and sanitation sector, though since 2010 it has expanded into areas such as health, education, technology, agriculture, and economic development.

== History ==
Thomas Bjelkeman-Pettersson and Jeroen van der Sommen met at the Stockholm World Water Week in 2006. The project aimed to support the Millennium Development Goals by using open-source software and open data within the development sector. Consequently, in 2008, the Akvo Foundation was formed by the Netherlands Water Partnership and several other co founders, including Bjelkeman-Pettersson and van der Sommen as well as Mark Nitzberg, Mark Charmer, Gabriel von Heijne, and Peter van der Linde. The Foundation was co-directed by Thomas and Peter.

=== Early timeline ===
September 2006 - Seed funding is provided by the Netherlands Water Partnership (NWP). The partner organizations that participate in brainstorming about what Akvo should become are UNESCO-IHE, IRC International Resource Centre for Water and Sanitation (IRC) and the Movement Design Bureau.

April 2007 – Partners for Water and NWP provide the first batch of funding.

August 2007 – Akvopedia is shown for the first time at World Water Week.

In 2015, Akvo was named as the winner of the Water and Sanitation Award. The award was given for sanitation projects in Latin America. In November 2015, Akvo received the Dutch Water Innovation Prize for developing an irrigation inlet sensor that measures surface water salinity.

=== Projects and Partnerships ===
In 2015, Akvopedia began transferring content to Wikiversity. Akvopedia has served as source content for the Wikiversity portal and the Rainwater harvesting portal.

In 2016, Akvo worked with UNICEF to collect data during a severe drought in Ethiopia. The organization recorded over 80,000 survey responses used to assist in directing emergency resources.

Since 2014, Akvo has worked in Fiji, Vanuatu, and the Solomon Islands to introduce mobile-based data and asset management tools for disaster-related decision-making, winning an innovationXchange award for the project. In 2016, Akvo Flow was used in Fiji to collect data on damage caused by Cyclone Winston.

== Products and services ==
Akvo designs open-source Software as a Service software and provides related training and consulting services. All Akvo's software is released as open-source software. The software tools are used to collect, analyze, and distribute monitoring data. Organ that use Akvo services include UNDP, UNICEF and a number of other NGOs and governments.

Akvo Flow (Field Level Operation Watch) allows field surveys to be managed and carried out using mobile phones. It can be used to collect, manage, analyze, and display geographically-referenced monitoring and evaluation data. Flow was originally developed by Water for People. In 2012, Water for People partnered with Akvo, and the foundation assumed primary development responsibilities for Flow. Initially Flow was used primarily in water and sanitation projects, but has more recently been used in a variety of fields, including fisheries management, school management and disaster relief. Since 2010, 3.990.763 data points have been captured with Flow.

Akvo RSR (Really Simple Reporting) was launched in September 2008 and was the first product Akvo developed; it is a content management and reporting system for international development projects. There are now over 4000 projects on the platform, with a combined value of over €150 billion.

Akvopedia was created in 2007 and was the first project that Akvo worked on. It is a Web-based, free content, water and sanitation knowledge resource. Akvopedia is written collaboratively by volunteers and specialists, mainly from the water and sanitation sector but anyone can edit and contribute. It is organised within five portals – Water, Sanitation, Finance, Sustainability and Decision & assessment tools. Recently some of this content has been transferred to Wikiversity in the Rainwater Harvesting portal.

Akvo Sites is a WordPress-based content management system developed by the foundation to build and maintain websites.

Akvo Caddisfly is a water quality and soil quality testing system based on smartphones. It was originally developed by Ternup Research Labs to detect the presence of fluoride in drinking water before Ternup partnered with Akvo in early 2014. The platform supports test strips, phone-connected sensors, and colorimetric tests.

Akvo Lumen is a data visualisation platform and is Akvo's latest product. It is developed in the Clojure programming language.

== Reception ==
National Geographic Society reported from World Water Week in Stockholm about the WaterCube: "Man-on-the-street journalism meets wonky water week. Frenetic water cube workers ushered a steady stream of conference attendees into their fishbowl lounge for quick Flip camera interviews. The close-ups may not be flattering, but it is interesting to hear the stream of consciousness that pours from the mouths of the unprepared and unedited. From high-profile corporate and academic leadership to those implementing projects on the ground around the world, the resulting online mosaic of more than 200 interviews collected over the last two years seems to present a near-complete view of the issues covered over six days of workshops, plenary sessions, and panels."

Giulio Quaggiotto of the World Bank noted that the system provided real-time reporting from field environments. Also, Bruce Sterling said "It's an open-source sanitation project, and if that isn't weird enough, they've got a Bollywood-parody promotional angle."
