= National Center for Appropriate Technology =

The National Center for Appropriate Technology (NCAT) is an American organization headquartered in Butte, Montana, that is dedicated to appropriate technology and sustainability. Projects specifically deal with sustainable energy, sustainable agriculture and food, sustainable living, farm energy, and climate change. The center was created in 1976 by the merger of several energy conservation programs started after the 1973 oil crisis.

It carries out projects within the United States, especially in poor rural areas. It has regional offices in Davis, California; Fayetteville, Arkansas; San Antonio, Texas; Jackson, Mississippi; and Keene, New Hampshire.

Its headquarters is located in the former Silver Bow County Poor Farm Hospital, which is listed on the U.S. National Register of Historic Places.

== ATTRA ==
Since the farm crisis in the 1980s, NCAT has operated ATTRA, the National Sustainable Agriculture Information Service. The program goal is to provide technical assistance to farmers throughout the nation in succeeding with sustainable, organic and regenerative agriculture.

ATTRA was originally an acronym for "Appropriate Technology Transfer for Rural Areas" which has since fallen out of use and is just "ATTRA".

== See also ==
- Small Business Technology Transfer programs, which are usually connected with Small Business Innovation Research programs (for example, the USDA agricultural SBIR)
