= Jock Brandis =

Canadian actor and writer

Jock Brandis is an author, film actor, film technician, inventor, and humanitarian. Brandis has received the 2006 Popular Mechanics Breakthrough Award for Innovation and the 2008 Purpose Prize, which he received in recognition for his work and experience.

Brandis was born in the Netherlands and moved to Canada in his youth. He joined CUSO, a Canadian humanitarian group in his twenties and later got involved with other charitable organizations such as Oxfam. After returning to Canada Brandis began working in multiple films as a gaffer, cinematographer, and on lighting and special effects. If necessary, Brandis would use various odds and ends to create special cameras or lighting rigs. Brandis would later state that his experience working with charitable organizations made it easier to create these items. During the 70s Brandis and his wife, Suzanna, were the subjects of the documentary film The Salvage Prince, which focused on their efforts to restore a historic tugboat.

In 2002 Brandis began working on a water treatment system for a small village in Mali. During this time he discovered that the village's women spent much of their time shelling peanuts by hand, a process that would often leave their hands bloody and sore. To alleviate their burden Brandis contacted Dr. Tim Williams of UGA, who informed him of a Bulgarian peanut shelling design. With the help of a friend, Brandis adapted the design, which went through several redesigns before he completed the Universal Nut Sheller. Brandis's work on the sheller was later covered in the 2002 short documentary film Peanuts and in the 2007 book The Promise of Peanuts: A real-life fairy tale.

In 2014 Brandis and author Gwenyfar Rohler finished work on a stage adaptation of the 1977 film Death Bed: The Bed That Eats, in which Brandis starred as a priest. Brandis also worked on the film's special effects and created the titular "Bed That Eats". The play covered both the film's plot and the making of the film.

== Books ==
- Brandis, Jock (2000). The Ship's Cat. San Jose, TX: Writers Club Press. ISBN 9780595129973.

== Filmography ==
=== As actor ===
- Death Bed: The Bed That Eats (1977, as Priest, also worked on special effects)
- Scanners (1981, as Scanner in Attic)
- Maximum Overdrive (1986, as Dump Truck Driver, uncredited)
