= The Appropriate Technology Collaborative =

The Appropriate Technology Collaborative is an American non-profit dedicated to designing everyday technologies for the global poor.

Some ATC Projects are open to US volunteer participation. These projects inspire intercultural collaboration and mutual educational exchange as local and foreign participants share skills and knowledge on the work site. These volunteer trips aids in creating cross-cultural understanding while addressing issues surrounding poverty in the developing world. ATC projects empower local communities to decide what technology is needed, build it, use it and plan for maintenance.

ATC also runs a women's education and social venture business incubation program called “Mayan Power and Light” in which young Mayan women study solar power installation, electrical circuits and carpentry to start their own solar businesses. These solar businesses can market to low-income families who purchase small-scale systems designed to charge an LED light and a cell phone. Larger systems are also available as families scale-up their solar power systems. The availability of low-cost solar lighting will reduce weekly costs on kerosene, candles or expensive electricity bills. This allows low income families to spend extra cash on nutrition, education or health while increasing their nighttime productivity. Mayan Power and Light aims to grow a new local, green economy that empowers women in business and technical fields.

In 2016 ATC's Mayan Power and Light program was recognized as one of the top 100 leaders in global sustainability by United Nations Compact for Sustainable Development's Sustainia program.

In 2019 Mayan Power and Light won the ENERGY GLOBE Award for Guatemala. Energy Globe is today's most prestigious environmental prize worldwide, honoring projects presenting sustainable solutions to climate change.

ATC shares drawings and designs of their appropriate technologies, open-source on their website. These designs have been downloaded in over 40 countries by over 7,000 nonprofits, governments and individuals. ATC's projects have been implemented in India, Papua New Guinea, Nicaragua, and Guatemala.

The Appropriate Technology Collaborative's previous projects include: Wind Energy, Solar Energy, Solar Vaccine Refrigerator, Solar Replacements for Kerosene Lamps, Squatter City Infrastructure, Water Pumps such as the Treadle Pump and Ram Pump, Hand Crank Water Purifier, Recycled home insulation using corn/rice sacks, Solar Hot Water Heating, Fuel Efficient “Rocket” Stoves, Natural Building with Earth and Lime for ecological and economical home construction

== Programs ==
ATC has four primary programs: product design, product development, education and business development.

- Product design: The most crucial stage in developing a successful product for low-income consumers is deciding what to design. In order to listen, learn, comprehend needs, and explain options, ATC works with local populations in low-income regions.
- Product development: ATC forms collaborative design teams with input from customers, regional engineers, and industry mentors. At colleges and universities as well as the Maker Works site in Ann Arbor, Michigan, ATC develops product prototypes. ATC will prototype the product in the nation where it is to be utilized after a fresh design has been tested in the lab. All stages of the product development process involve local talent.
- Education: The ATC education program provides opportunities for qualified professional mentors, high school, undergraduate, and graduate students and World Challenge Design Teams. This program promotes a free flow of information between university students and faculty, design clients and ATC's incubated businesses. Most new products developed by ATC, World Challenge Design Teams, or mentors are disseminated online for free from the ATC Website.
  - Student design teams who work with ATC are invited to prototype and test the designs in one of the ATC's facilities in Guatemala or Nicaragua. Designs are tested and data is collected in ATC client communities.
  - ATC provides an opportunity for student interns, workshop employees and volunteers to participate in the product design and business development process by presenting ATC designs in rural communities, rural clinics, schools, hospitals, and community centers. This outreach demonstrates the affordability, and value of ATC products and increases acceptance in target populations.
- Social venture business development: In 2012 ATC began working with engineering and entrepreneurial talent in developing countries to create new sustainable businesses that provide income to people living in rural villages and urban slums.

== Gallery ==
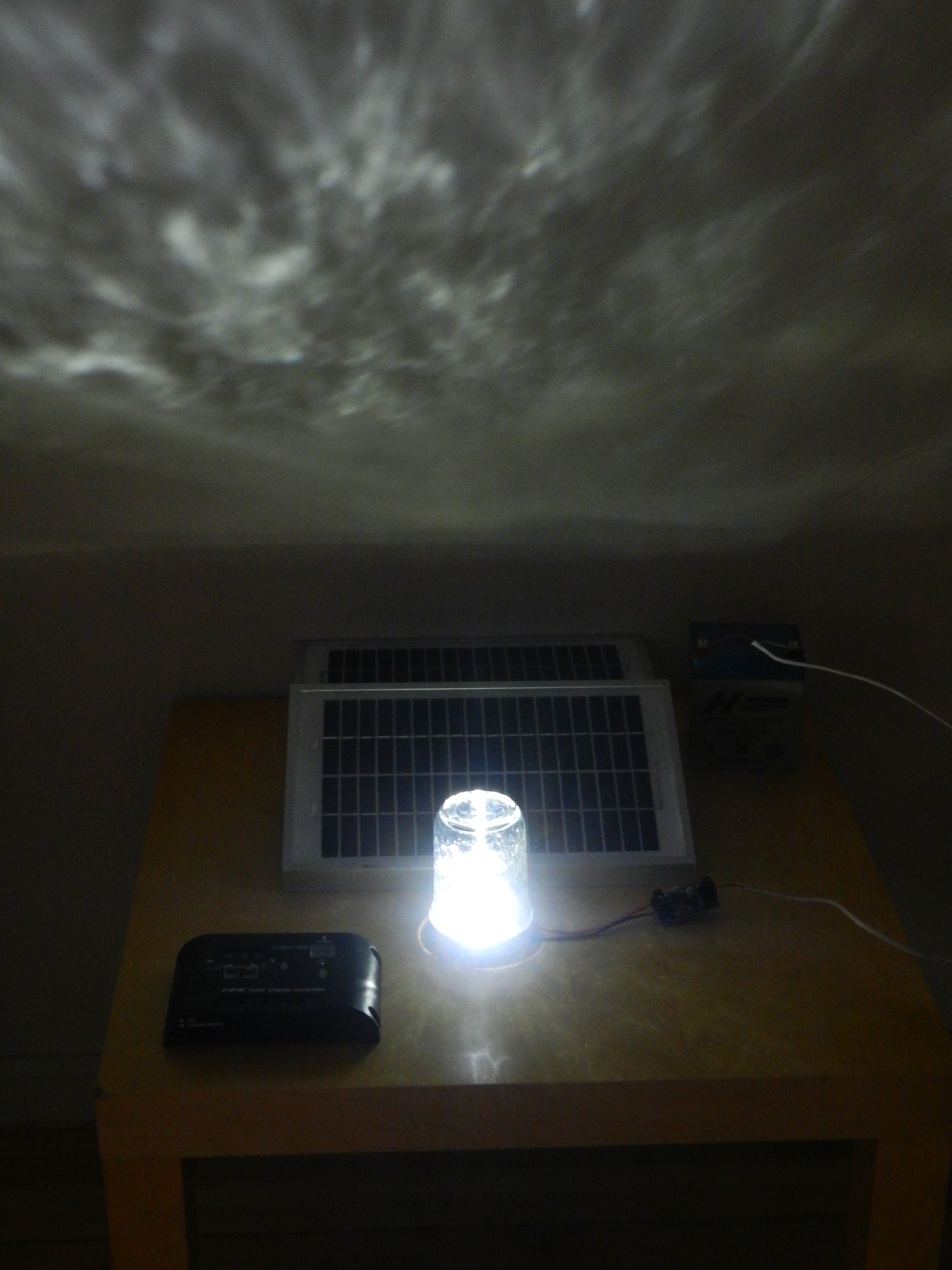
Small scale home energy system, 2010

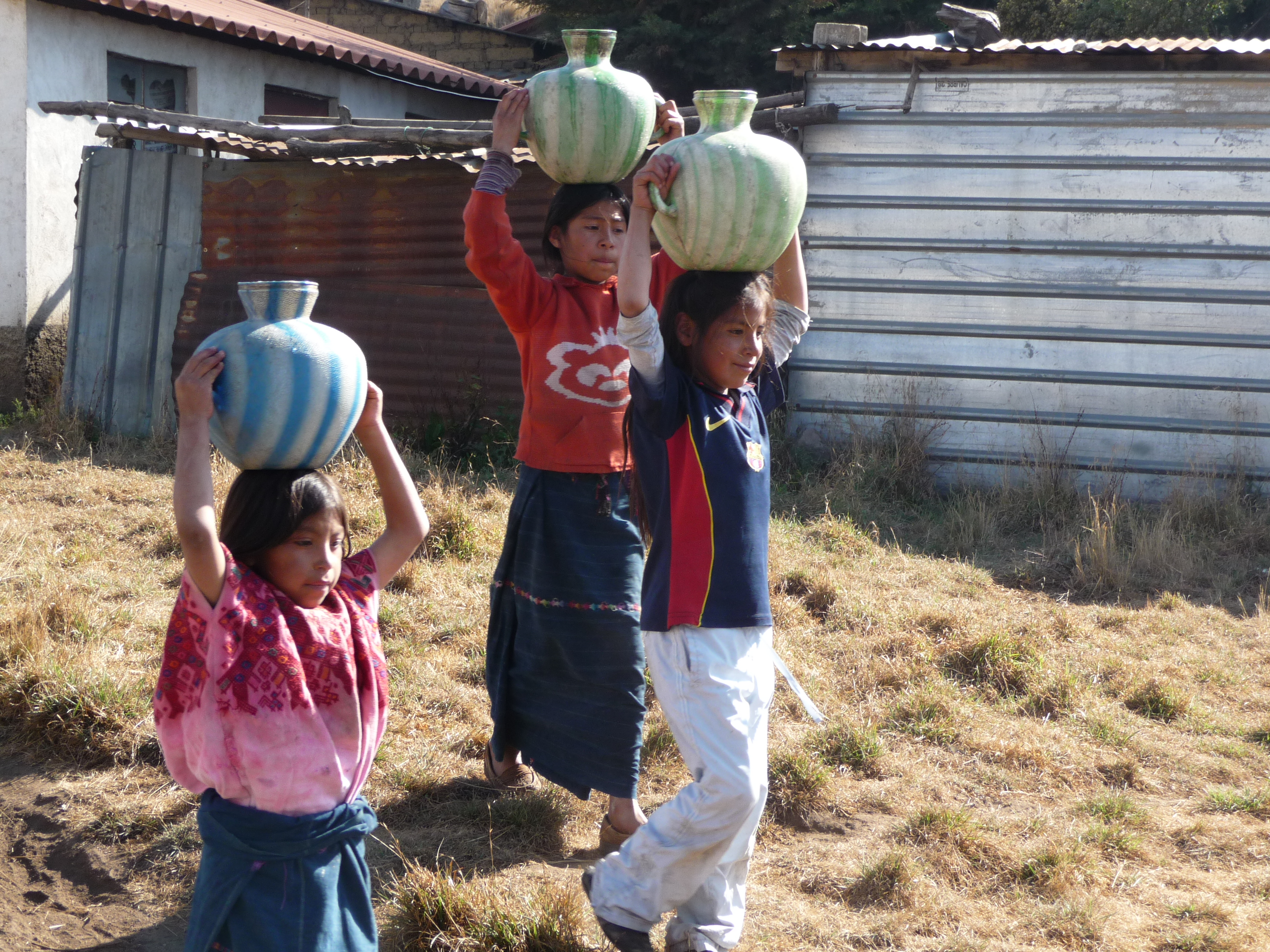
Girls carry water, 2008

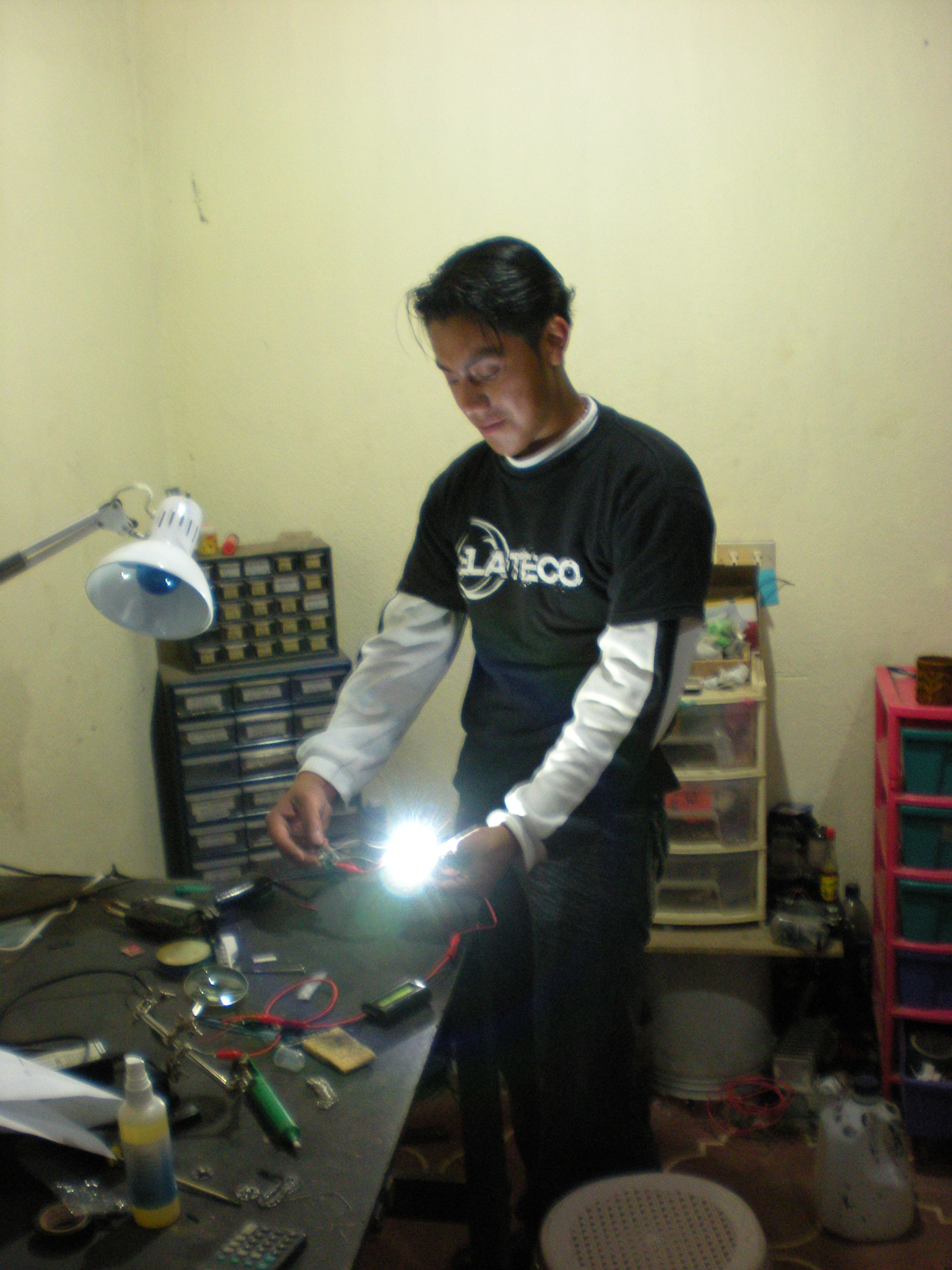
Carlos of Xela Teco Working on Solar LED, 2009

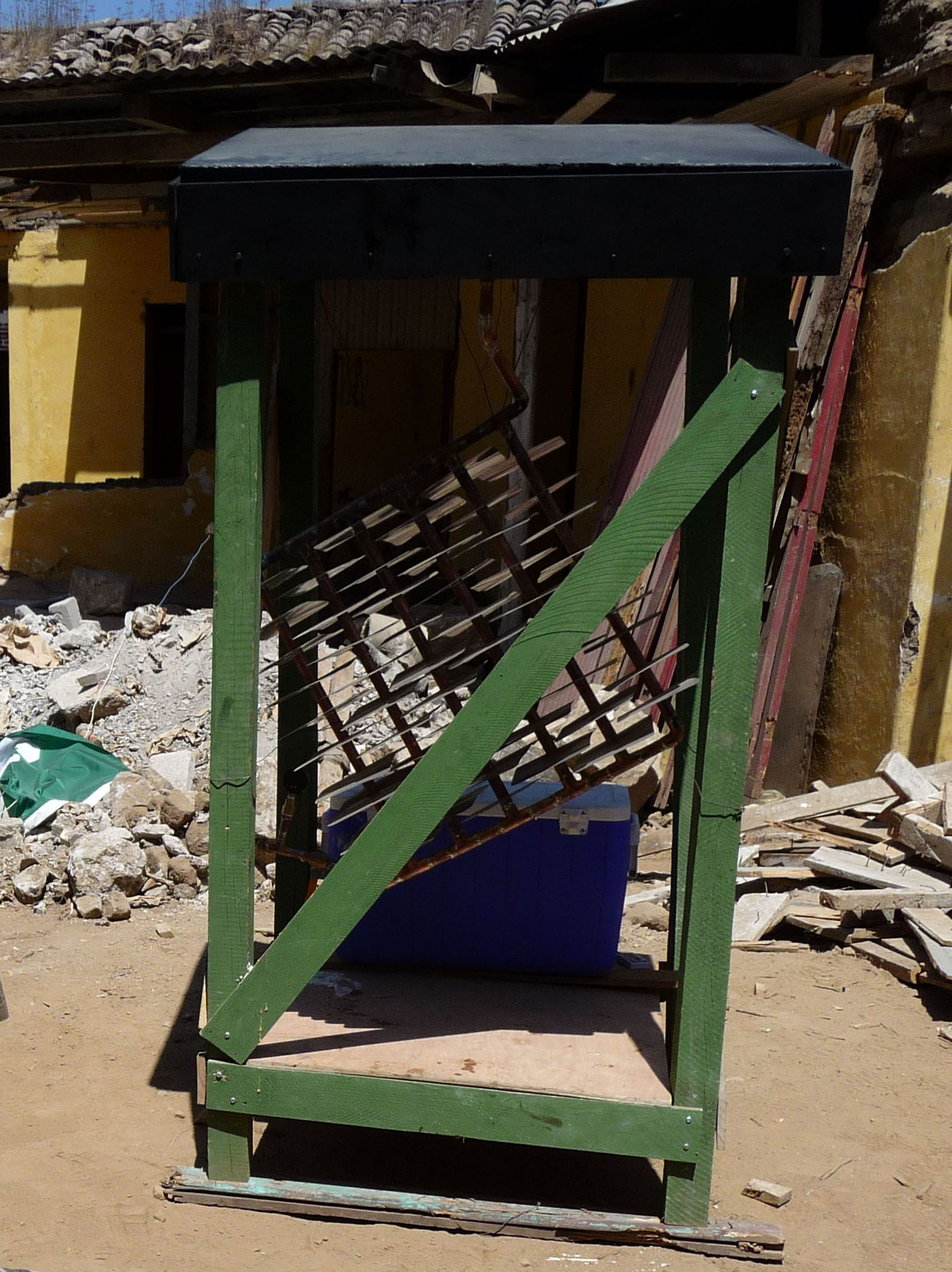
ATC + MSU Solar Vaccine Refrigerator, 2009

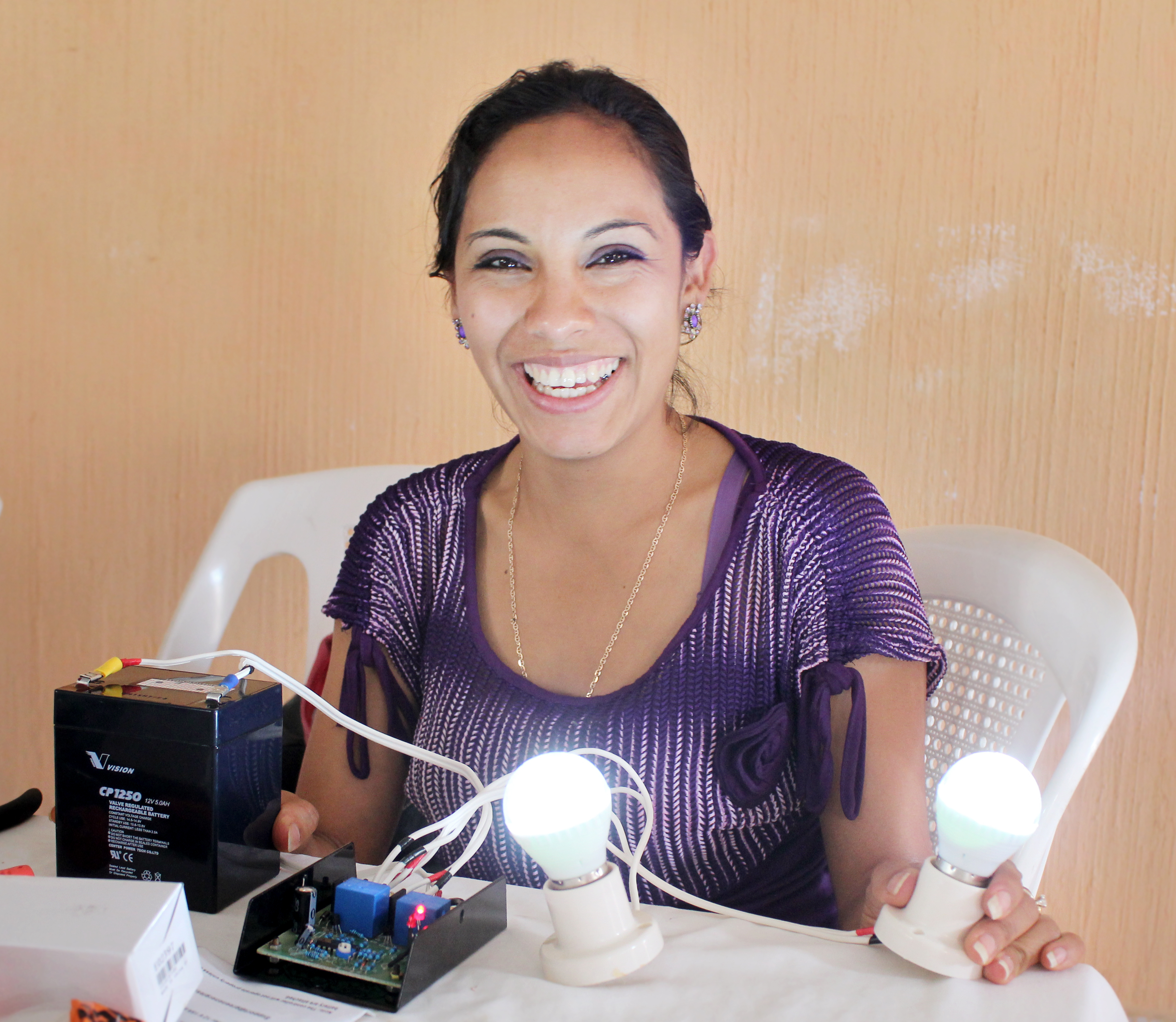
Learning about solar power

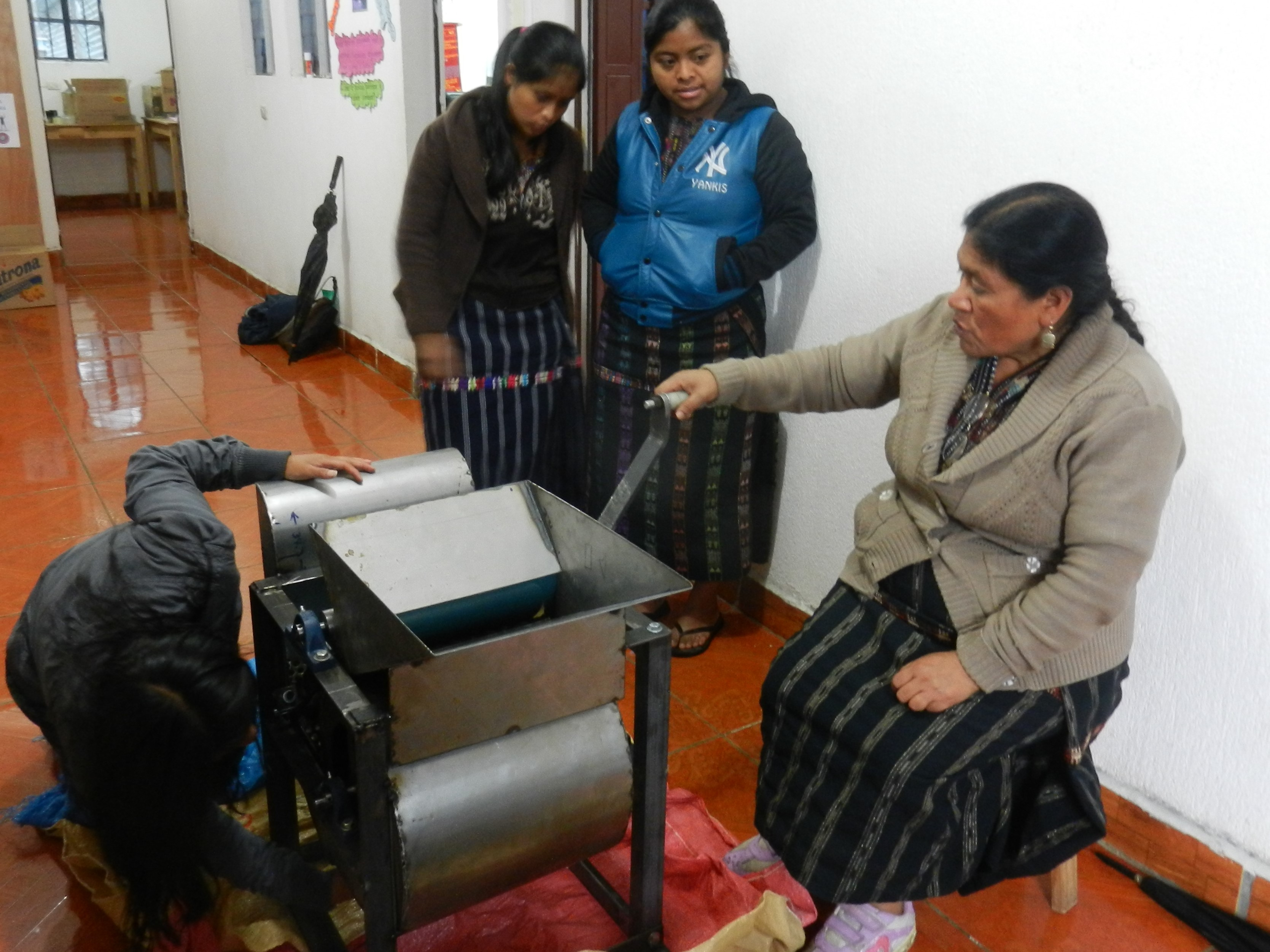
Improving quality of labor and increasing efficiency for a cooperative of over 100 women farmers in Guatemala

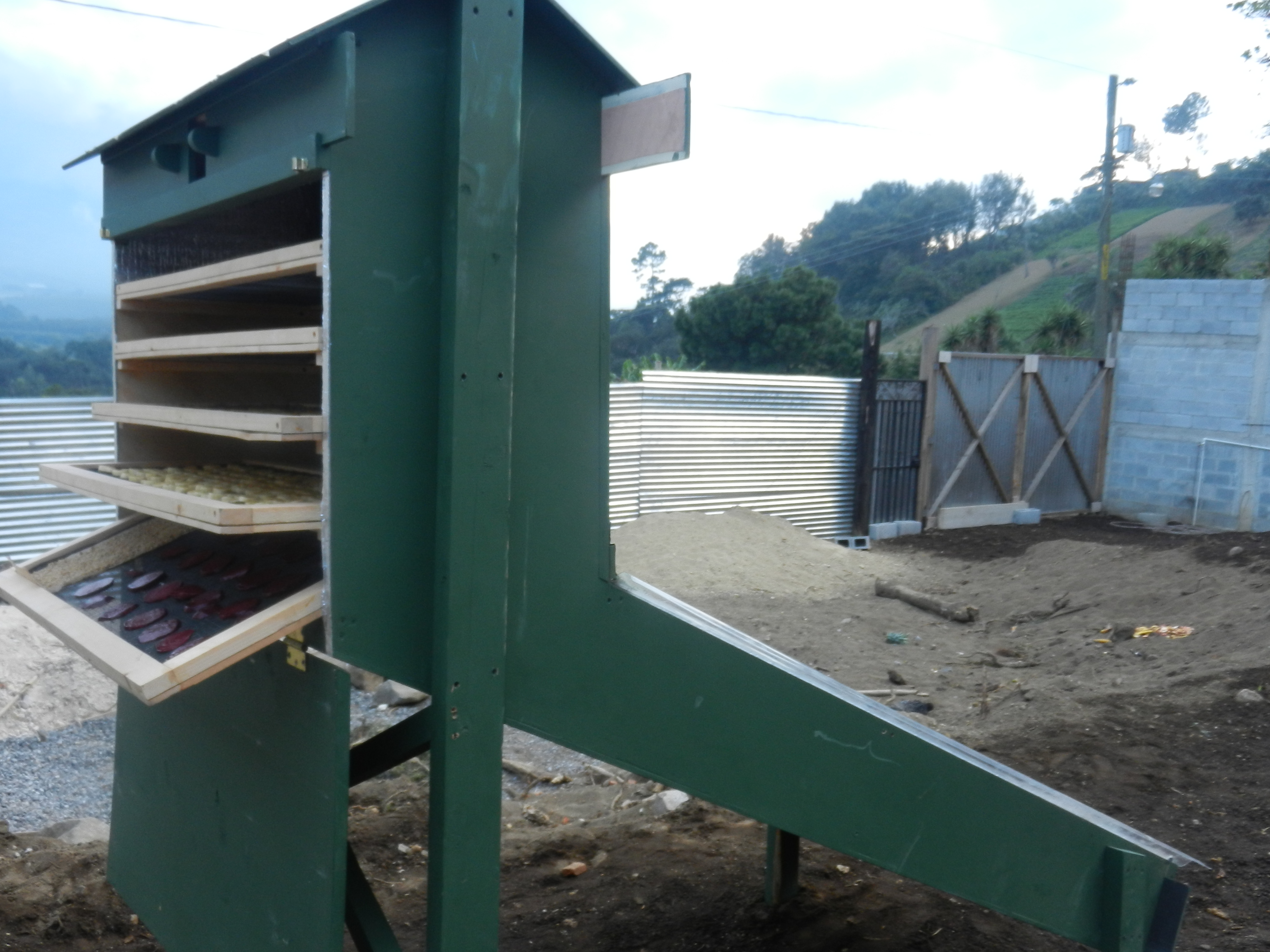
Drying herbs, fruit, fish and meat creates unique products with dignified work for rural communities
