= Catalytic Communities =

Nonprofit think tank and advocacy organization

Catalytic Communities (CatComm)
- Comunidades Catalisadoras (ComCat)
- Founded: 2000
- Type: 501(c)(3) charity and non-profit (US); Non-profit organization (Brazil)
- Registration no.: 52-2266240
- Headquarters: Rio de Janeiro, Washington, DC
- Services: Sustainable community development, urban planning, environmental protection
- Official language: Portuguese, English, Spanish
- Founder and Executive Director: Theresa Williamson, PhD
- Institutional Director & Editor: Roseli Franco
- Board of directors: Bryan McCann (Georgetown University), Mariana Cavalcanti (State University of Rio de Janeiro), Cecilia Olliveira (Fogo Cruzado), Guillermo Douglass-Jaimes (Pomona College), Greg Rosenberg (Center for Community Land Trust Innovation)
- Website: catcomm.org

Catalytic Communities (CatComm) is a Rio de Janeiro-based non-profit, think tank, and advocacy non-government organization (NGO) that conducts work in sustainable community development, human rights, communications, and urban planning. It is "one of the first online initiatives to share solutions to civic and social problems." Founded in 2000, the organization has been recognized in media news outlets, academic publications, and local communities for their work. Its stated vision is to "leverage social media, provide community training, and advocate for participatory planning and pro-favela policies with the long term goal of realizing the potential of Rio de Janeiro as a true example of inclusive urban integration".

CatComm gained particular media and news coverage following the Olympics in 2016 held in Rio de Janeiro, Brazil. The organization influenced the narrative on the Olympics by publishing articles with community perspectives (in both Portuguese and English) and maintaining contact with international journalists through press conferences and social media engagement. It offered reality tours to journalists, described the complexities of the informal economy, and promoted community-based environmental projects. It was also widely known for eliminating the word "slum" to describe Rio's favelas, historic neighborhoods in Rio that were being threatened with illegal occupations and evictions. Instead, they argued that these communities were subject to misrepresentations around the world and should be instead referred to as favelas. It aimed to avoid blanket statements for describing neighborhoods as dramatized descriptions of drug trafficking and shanties, which did not apply to the vast majority of favela residents. The RioOnWatch initiative was subsequently recognized as the go-to source for information on favelas in Brazil, particularly amidst the media coverage of the Olympics.

== History ==
In 2000, the organization was founded by Theresa Williamson while completing her PhD in city planning at the University of Pennsylvania. She has won numerous prizes and awards, including the 2005 Gill-Chin Lim Award for Best Dissertation on International Planning, the 2012 National Association of Housing and Redevelopment Officials Award for her contributions to the international housing debate, and the 2018 American Society of Rio prize for her contributions to the city. Williamson previously worked as a Network & Communications Consultant for the Forests Now campaign in Oxford, United Kingdom, and as a translator and English instructor to the General Ombudsman's Office in Curitiba, Paraná, Brazil.

CatComm has adopted the following principles as part of its mission, referred to as The Nine Elements of CatComm's Approach:

- I. Clearly Defined Mission, Evolving Strategy.
- II. Locally-Led Initiatives, Mutual Learning and Trust at the Core.
- III. Ongoing Documentation, Situational Analysis and Contextualization.
- IV. Multiple Points of Entry.
- V. Culture of Experimentation and Non-Attachment.
- VI. Network-based Approach. Some Resemblance to Movement Organizing.
- VII. Ongoing, Real-time Data Collection.
- VIII. Continuous Reflection and Adaptation.
- IX. Scaling by Example

== Projects ==
=== Phase I, 2000–2008 ===
Two of the CatComm's early initiatives were the Community Solutions Database (CSD) and Casa do Gestor Catalisador. The CSD, the internet's first open-access database of detailed community solutions. Available in Portuguese, English and Spanish, the database was designed to allow community activists and organizers to share ideas, disseminate information, and document best practices. The initiative had received international recognition for its network of 6,000+ members and its impact on local communities in Brazil. Over 250 solutions in 21 countries have been documented in the CSD. While much of this early work was not concerned with direct political action, it effectively brought social projects into the conversation of how to improve local communities using the technology available at the time.

Along with its CSD network, CatComm also initially ran a community center in Rio de Janeiro known as Casa do Gestor Catalisador (Casa Community Technology Hub). From 2003 to 2008, the Hub offered a physical meeting place for community leaders to discuss and plan new projects. Based in Rio's central historic port area, the Casa attracted over 1,000 local leaders and 400 external professionals (journalists, activists, professors, students) from 22 nations to engage in new projects. In 2006, it won the Tech Award from the Silicon Valley Tech Museum. That same year, the United Nations Habitat recognized the Casa as one of the 70 "Actionable Ideas" of urban sustainability. With its goals being accomplished through the evolution of technology and digital platforms, both the CSD and Casa were terminated in 2008.

=== Phase II, 2008–2016 ===
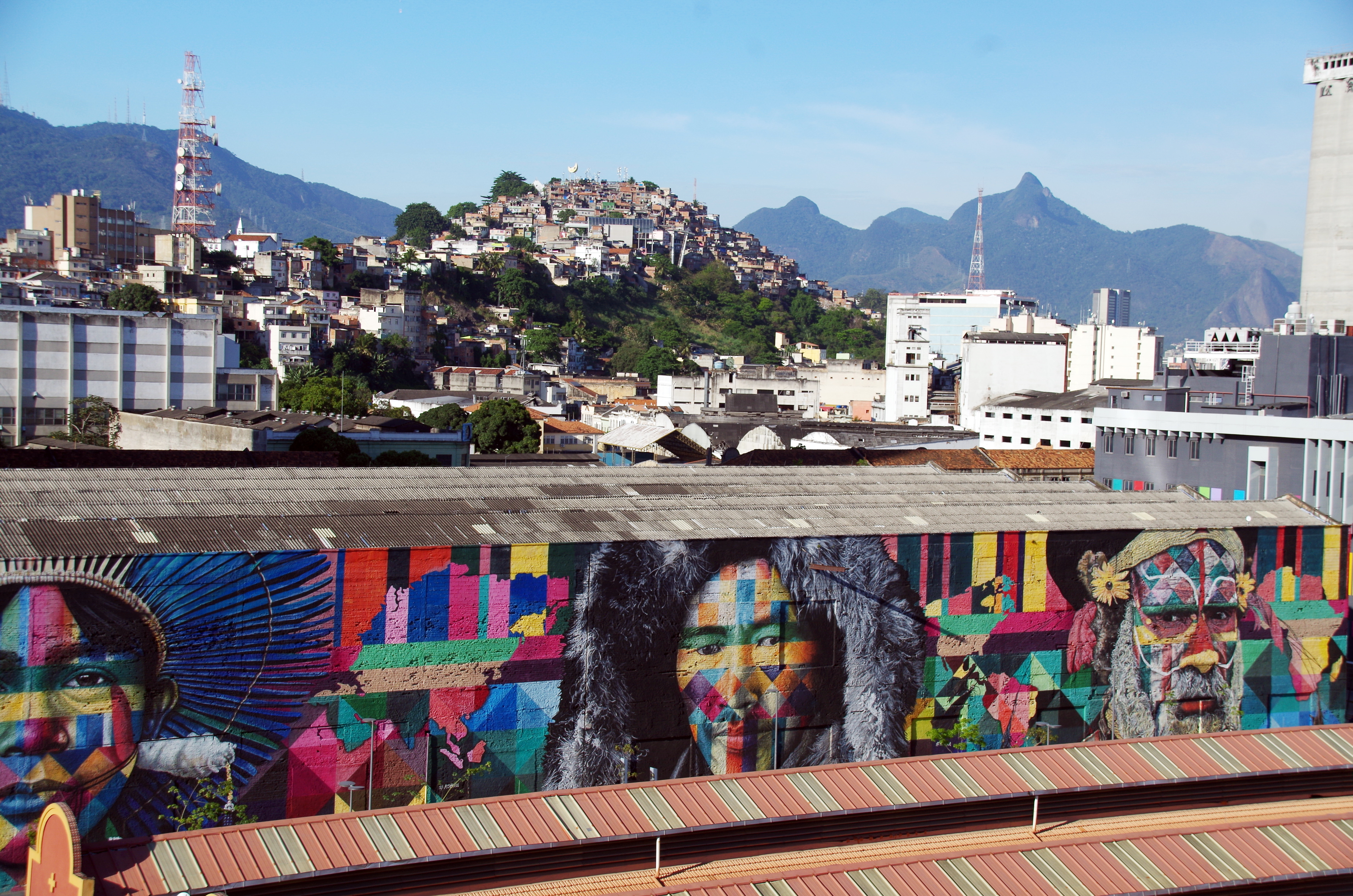
A favela in Rio de Janeiro

In 2008, CatComm further expanded operations with online publishing and social media engagement. This took the form of RioOnWatch, a local news site based on the group's 1,200 community leaders and 200 favelas. During the 2016 Summer Olympics, CatComm and RioOnWatch were particularly active in working to prevent forced evictions and protection local neighborhoods. The municipal government of Rio de Janeiro pushed for the removal of local neighborhoods to create wealthier ones, such as in the favelas of Indiana, Babilônia, Vidigal, Vila União de Curicica, Metrô-Mangueira, and Horto. In response, CatComm conducted workshops, produced educational material, and sought to protect the 1.4 million people in Rio de Janeiro's favelas. There were also numerous educational programming campaigns on Facebook, Twitter, YouTube, WordPress, and Blogger that brought international attention to the cause.

A pivotal moment in CatComm's history was the Summer Olympics in 2016. It recognized that Olympic organizers consistently pushed the notion that the Olympic Games were good for cities and countries, and evidence suggested that mainstream media outlets tended to disseminate a similar message. They denounced the translation of Rio's favela neighborhoods as "slums" or "ghettos" which painted an inaccurate picture of the working-class neighborhoods. In turn, international press organizations highlighted the gap between the government's rhetoric and the more complicated reality of Rio through the work of CatComm. CatComm thus promoted the image of favelas as culturally rich and economically vibrant communities that maintained historic architecture in the face of increased gentrification. Subsequent articles published in Time, The New York Times, NBC, and BBC on Rio's favelas turned to Williamson and CatComm for localized knowledge.

After the Olympics in 2016, RioOnWatch shifted its focus to influencing public policy. It has since aimed to inform international development organizations, publish columns specific to Brazil's favela communities, highlight successful organization strategies, popularize innovative urban planning concepts, and documenting the legacy of the Olympics on favelas. It released two films, Favelas as a Sustainable Model and Weaving the Sustainable Favela Network to document the spark global dialogue on the topic and were met with international acclaim. The former was the recipient of the Best Mid-Length Film Award at the Cine Periferia Pai D’égua Film Festival in Belém. According to its more recent annual report in 2019, RioOnWatch had an increased readership of 50% with over 3,200 articles published and 350,000 people reached per month. Moreso, RioOnWatch itself was award the Webbys Honoree in the “Best Communities” category in 2016.

=== Phase III, 2016–2024 ===
In 2017, CatComm launched the Sustainable Favela Network (SFN) which focused on sustainable initiatives in local communities. The organization mainly works with favelas to tackle environmental issues, including waste management, community gardens, environmental preservation, and sustainable technology. A survey by the SFN found that 85% of the favela organizations wanted to install solar panels and transition to other sustainable technologies. SFN was also a major attempt to promote international dialogue on the topic of sustainability through mapping initiatives and quantitative analysis. Since 2018, SFN has also organized events through its annual network exchange. SFN recently published a major report, with support from the Heinrich Böll Stiftung Brasil, that documented CatComm's new mapping projects.

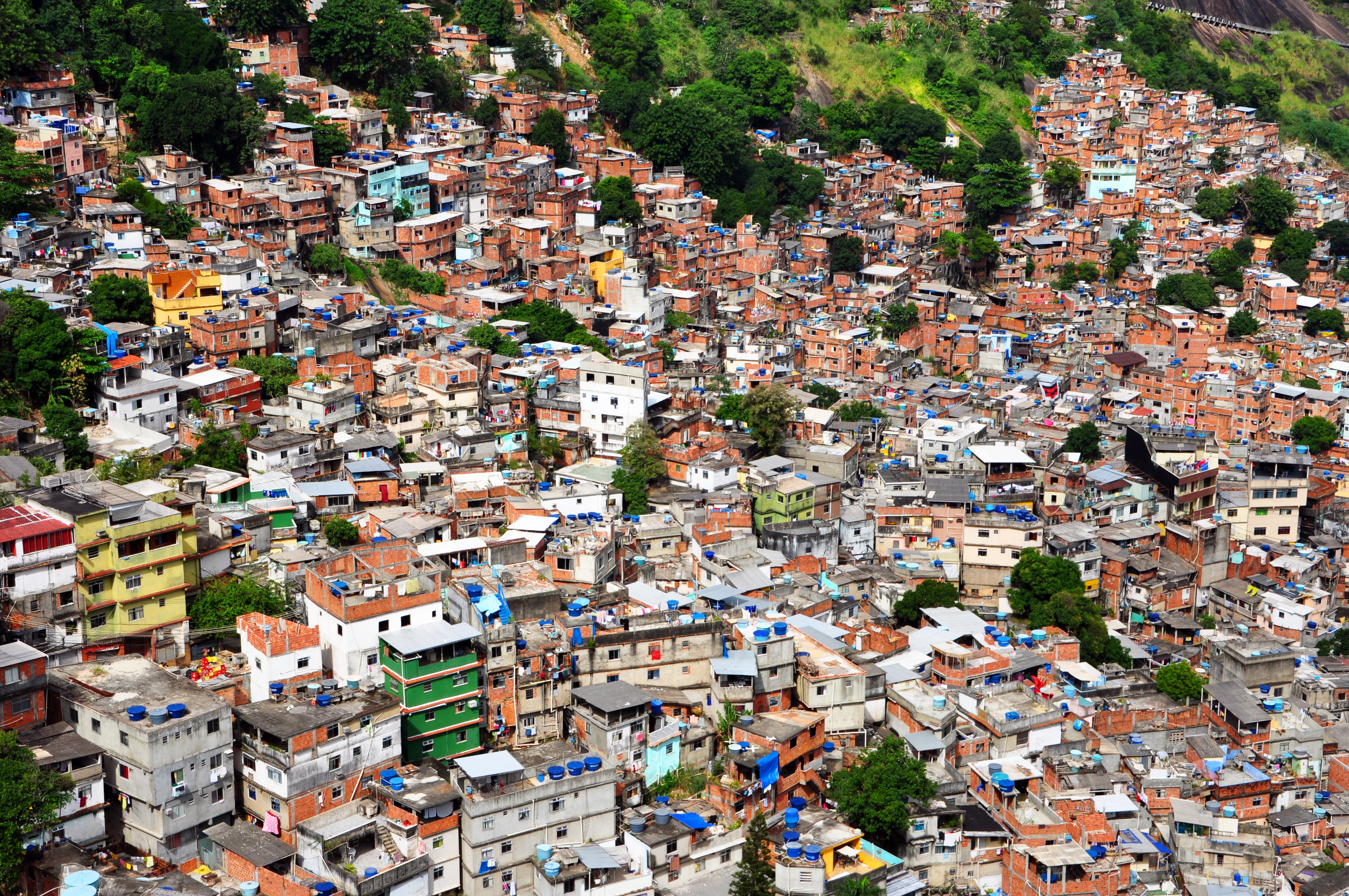
A bird's eye view of Rocinha, the largest favela in Rio

Most recently, CatComm began the Favela Community Land Trusts (CLTs) initiative. The grassroots-based model aims to support individual ownership of houses through collective ownership of land. This new model aims to protect against evictions and gentrification through tenure security. While the CLT-based model has existed for decades, CatComm's favela-focused CLT formalizes the process of home ownership. Studies have shown CLTs are effective in reducing speculation and displacement of marginalized communities in Latin America. Further attempts to bring the CLT to other at-risk communities around the world, such as Caño Martín Peña communities in Puerto Rico, have recently begun. The report compiled evidence to show the desires of favela communities to undertake new social and environmental projects. These neighborhoods would then be given a sense of "control" as they were integrated into the formal city. Since its founding, SFN has made a tangible impact on the Rio de Janeiro, with 54% of its organizations women-led and over 150 initiatives planned. As of today, the CLT working group has over 150 members in 67 institutions who regularly participated in community workshops and legislative proposals.

Currently in its third phase of organizational development, CatComm's present mission is supporting sustainable and asset-based community development (ABCD) in Rio's favelas. This cycle has been particularly supported by RioOnWatch's new Community Journalists' Network and the growth of the Favela CLTs. In Phase IV (2024–2030), according to its website, it will seek to expand its model of urban integration and social equity on a global scale.

== See also ==
- International development
- Sustainability organization
- Sustainable community
