= Appropedia =

Wiki about appropriate technology

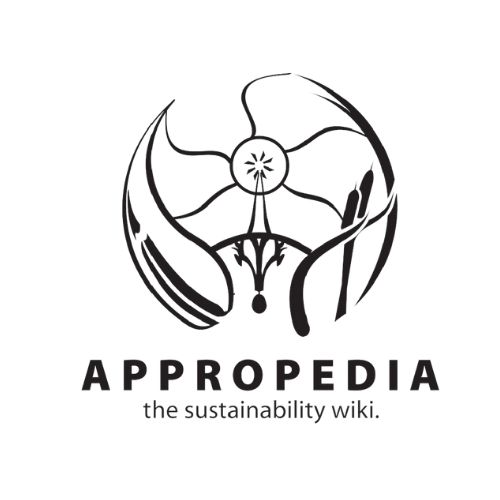

- Screenshot of the Appropedia web interface on March 13, 2026
- Website: appropedia.org
- Commercial: No
- Registration: Optional
- Launched: 2007
- Content license: Creative Commons Attribution-ShareAlike 3.0

Appropedia is a wiki-based website that contains content relating to sustainability, poverty, environmental degradation, and international development. It was founded in 2006 by an instructor at Cal Poly Humboldt.

== Purpose ==
Appropedia can be used to help people who lack in financial stability and are looking for an alternative source to advance their financial expertise as well as environmental sustainability.

== Nomenclature ==
Appro means "Appropriate Technology". Despite "pedia" in the title, the site is not an encyclopedia, but a collection of various types of content, including original research.

== History ==
Appropedia was founded in 2006 and registered it as a not for profit in California.

== Site organization ==
The website is organized into portals that are groups of articles arranged by topics. Topics include construction, energy, food & agriculture, health, and water. Like other wiki based websites, the content can be navigated in multiple ways, using tags to indicate themes.

Content is made under the Creative Commons Attribution-Share Alike 3.0 license.

=== Comparison with Wikipedia ===
The rules for content acceptance and editing on Appropedia vary from Wikipedia due to having different goals. For example:

- While Wikipedia requires verifiability, Appropedia prefers verifiability but does not demand it.
- While Wikipedia prohibits original research, Appropedia encourages it.
- While Wikipedia requires a neutral point of view, Appropedia encourages a neutral point of view, but notably the content tends to be uploaded by people with affiliations to the topic.

== Notable uses ==
An Ontario man, Aren Page, used Appropedia to help him design an off-grid residential vehicle.

Michigan Technological University faculty Joshua Pearce used Appropedia to share hundreds of designs for cost saving.
