= Open manufacturing =

Model of localised production

Open manufacturing, also known as open production, maker manufacturing or material peer production and with the slogan "Design Global, Manufacture Local" is a new model of socioeconomic production in which physical objects are produced in an open, collaborative and distributed manner and based on open design and open-source principles.

Open manufacturing combines the following elements of a production process: new open production tools and methods (such as 3D printers), new value-based movements (such as the maker movement), new institutions and networks for manufacturing and production (such as FabLabs), and open source methods, software and protocols.

Open manufacturing may also include digital modeling and fabrication and computer numeric control (CNC) of the machines used for production through open source software and open source hardware.

The philosophy of open manufacturing is close to the open-source movement, but aims at the development of physical products rather than software. The term is linked to the notion of democratizing technology as embodied in the maker culture, the DIY ethic, the open source appropriate technology movement, the Fablab-network and other rooms for grassroots innovation such as hackerspaces.

== Principles ==
The openness of "open manufacturing" may relate to the nature of the product (open design), to the nature of the production machines and methods (e.g. open source 3D-printers, open source CNC), to the process of production and innovation (commons-based peer production / collaborative / distributed manufacturing), or to new forms of value creation (network-based bottom-up or hybrid versus business-centric top down). Jeremy Rifkin argues, that open production through 3D-printing "will eventually and inevitably reduce marginal costs to near zero, eliminate profit, and make property exchange in markets unnecessary for many (though not all) products".

== Socioeconomic implications ==
The following points are seen as key implications of open manufacturing:

- a democratization of (the means of) production,
- a decentralization of production and local value creation (global cooperation – local manufacturing),
- the possibility to produce high quality prototypes and products in small quantities at moderate (to increasingly low) prices,
- the closing of the gap between the formal and informal sector and opportunities for bottom-up open innovation, and
- a transition from consumer to producer for manufactured goods.

In the context of socioeconomic development, open manufacturing has been described as a path towards a more sustainable industrialization on a global scale, that promotes "social sustainability" and provides the opportunity to shift to a "collaboration-oriented industrialization driven by stakeholders from countries with different development status connected in a global value creation at eye level".

For developing countries, open production could notably lead to products more adapted to local problems and local markets and reduce dependencies on foreign goods, as vital products could be manufactured locally. In such a context, open manufacturing is strongly linked to the broader concept of Open Source Appropriate Technology movement.

== Views ==
According to scholar Michel Bauwens, Open Manufacturing is "the expansion of peer production to the world of physical production".

Redlich and Bruns define "Open Production" as "a new form of coordination for production systems that implies a superior broker system coordinating the information and material flows between the stakeholders of production", and which will encompass the entire value creation process for physical goods: development, manufacturing, sales, support etc.

Vasilis Kostakis et al argue that Open Manufacturing can organize production by prioritising socio-ecological well-being over corporate profits, over-production and excess consumption

A policy paper commissioned by the European Commission uses the term "maker manufacturing" and positions it between social innovation, open source ICT and manufacturing.

== Criticism ==
A number of factors are seen to hamper the broad-based application of the model of "open manufacturing" and / or to realize its positive implications for more sustainable global production pattern.

The first factor is the sustainability of commons-based peer production models: "Empowerment happens only, if the participants are willing to share their knowledge with their colleagues. The participation of the actors cannot be guaranteed, thus there are many cases known, where participation could only be insufficiently realized". Other problems include missing or inadequate systems of quality control, the persistent paradigm of high-volume manufacturing and its cost-efficiency, the lack of widely adopted platforms to share hardware designs, as well as challenges linked to the joint-ownership paradigm behind the open licenses of open manufacturing and the fact, that hardware is much more difficult to share and to standardize than software.

In developing countries, a number of factors need to be considered in addition to the points above. Scholar Waldman-Brown names the following: lack of manufacturing expertise and informality of current SMMs in emerging markets as an obstacle to quality control for final products and raw material as well as universities and vocational training programs not apt to react rapidly enough to provide the necessary knowledge and qualifications.

== Examples ==
- Open Source Ecology, a project for designing and building open source industrial machines, fabricated by eXtreme Manufacturing
- RepRap Project, a project to create an open-source self-copying 3D printer.
- Wikispeed, an automotive manufacturer that produces modular design cars using open source tools
- Local Motors: Applying open production to the field of transport and vehicles

== See also ==
- Distributed manufacturing – Coordinated decentralized manufacturing
- Cosmopolitan localism – Social innovation
- Open design – Movement for publicly shared designs
- Open source hardware – Hardware whose design source files are made available
- Open source – Publishing digital resources with their source files
- Collaboration – Act of working together
- Commons-based peer production – Method of producing value
- Open source appropriate technology – Appropriate technology from the open-design movement
- Collaborative software development model – Creation and maintenance of software
- Knowledge commons – Collectively shared and managed information
- Co-creation – Product or service design process
- Decentralized planning (economics) – Type of economic system
- Mass collaboration – Many people working on a single project
- Production for use – Economic concept
- Prosumer – Person who consumes and produces a product
- Gift economy – Mode of exchange where valuables are given without rewards
- OpenStructures – Open source modular construction model
