= Open-source car =

Car with open design

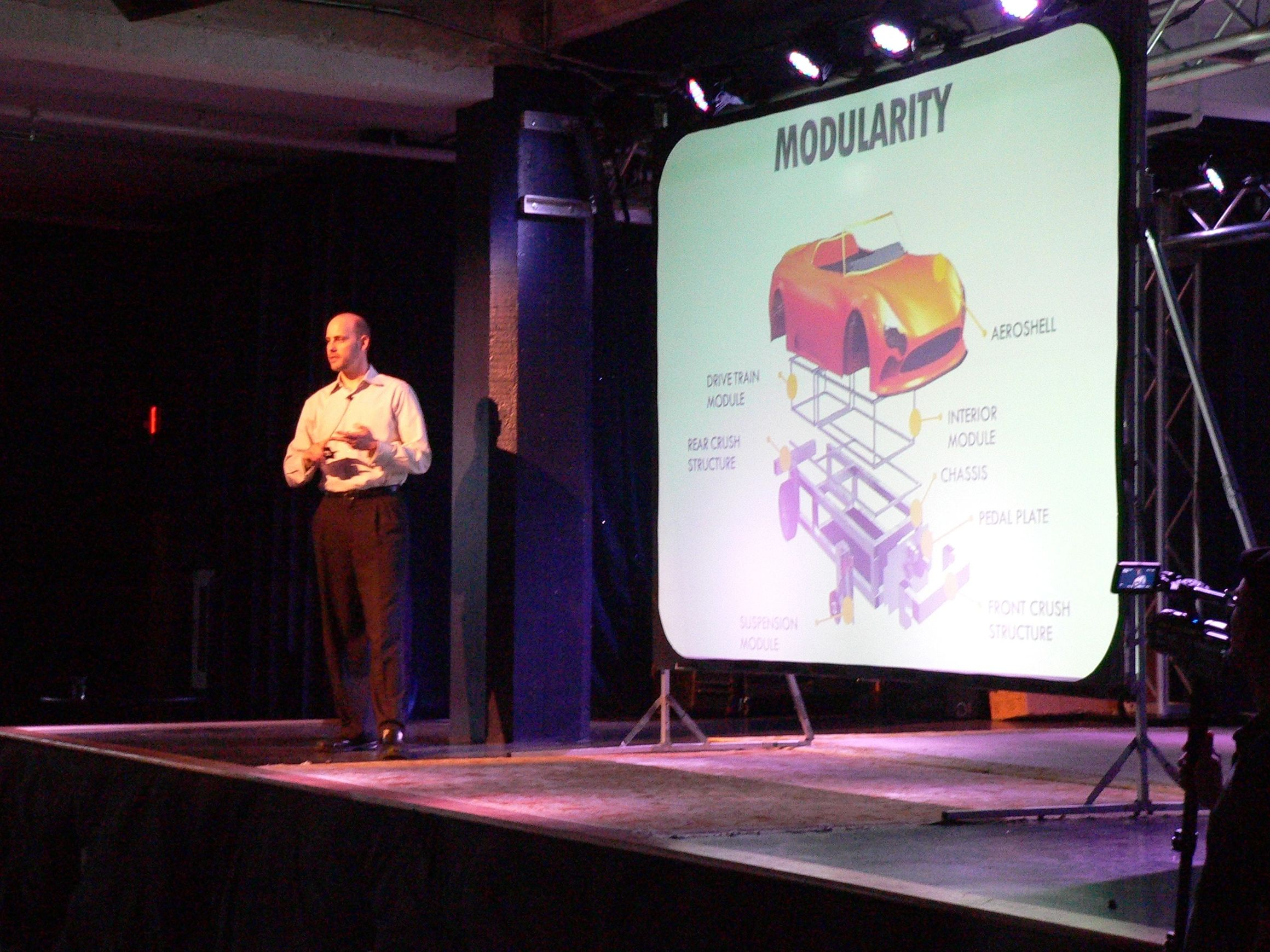
Joe Justice, founder of Wikispeed, presenting the cars' modular design

An open-source car is a car with open design: designed as open-source hardware, using open-source principles.

== Automobiles ==
Open-source cars include:

Completed and available to build, with link to CAD files and build instructions:

- OSVehicle Tabby: Tabby is the first OSVehicle: an industrializable, production ready, versatile, universal chassis.
- LifeTrac tractor from Open Source Ecology has build instructions for most revisions

Concept stage:

- Rally Fighter, an all-terrain vehicle by Local Motors uses a design released under a CC BY-NC-SA license. The design was made piece by piece by an open community in a forum. Several units have been manufactured and sold.
- SGT01 from Wikispeed
- OScar: started in 1999, still in concept phase as of 2013.
- Riversimple Urban Car: The CAD models for the Riversimple Hyrban technology demonstrator have been released under a CC BY-NC-SA
- Common, Dutch electric car (2009)
- eCorolla, an electric vehicle conversion
- Luka EV, an electric car production platform which first car is the Luka EV. Only Mrk I & II are open source, the source was closed in July 2016 to allow commercial production of Mrk III
- Google Community Vehicle, a multi-purpose mode of transport. It can be used as a farm vehicle that attaches to farming equipment or as a means to transport the produce. This car was created by an Indian team for the 2016 Michelin Challenge Design, "Mobility for All International Design Competition"

Self-driving car prototypes have collected petabytes of data. Some companies, including Daimler, Baidu, Aptiv, Lyft, Waymo, Argo AI, Ford and Audi have publicly released datasets under more-or-less open licenses.

== Other open-source vehicles ==
Many open-source vehicles come in the form of velomobiles, like the PUUNK, the Hypertrike, the evovelo mö or the Atomic Duck velomobile.

Other open-source vehicles include the Xtracycle cargo bicycles.

== See also ==
- Modular design, subdivision of a system into smaller parts which can be independently changed
- Kit car, an automobile sold as a set of parts
- Right to repair, legal right to freely modify and repair products
- Velomobile, enclosed human-powered vehicle "bicycle car"
