= EXtreme Manufacturing =

Agile-inspired framework for manufacturing and product development

eXtreme Manufacturing (XM) is an iterative and incremental framework for manufacturing improvement and new product development. It was inspired by the software development methodology Scrum and the systematic waste-elimination (lean) production scheduling system Kanban (かんばん(看板)).

It is often presented as the intersection between three contributing, component circles: that of Scrum (with its standard roles and responsibilities, its principles of iterative design and sprints, and of making work visible), of object-oriented architecture (emphasizing modularity of components, the interface/contract-first rather than contract-last approach to design, as borrowed from web programming, etc.), and of concepts from extreme programming (XP), a software development methodology, extended to engineering (including use of user stories, "pairing and swarming" work patterns, and ideas from test driven development). The framework also generally applies principles of behavior-driven development.

The name was coined in 2012 by Joe Justice, founder of Wikispeed, and Marcin Jakubowski, founder of Open Source Ecology, as a take-off of the name extreme programming (XP), a software development methodology. The XM framework, popularized by Justice and J.J. Sutherland, has a rich history, with origins that relate to the Japanese concept of a Kaizen (改善) or "improvement" business culture, and which predate the early implementations of agile software development.

== Origins ==
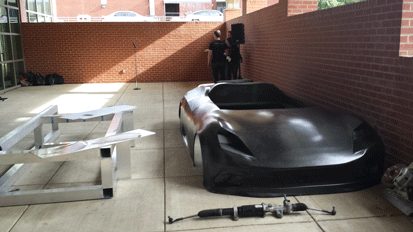
Getting Started at Agile DC 2013.

XM has its origins in the intersection between several fields of study, namely Agile Project Management, engineering (e.g. mechanical, materials), and Knowledge Management. The name was coined in 2012 after Extreme Programming (XP) software development by Joe Justice, founder of Wikispeed, and Marcin Jakubowski, founder of Open Source Ecology.

In 1986, Hirotaka Takeuchi and Ikujiro Nonaka wrote an HBR article on Scrum, entitled "New New Product Development Game," a treatment considered seminal. This work challenged the business community to adopt a more holistic approach toward achieving goals; now Scrum is considered a best practice in project management.

As Nonaka and Takeuchi progressed in their careers, they continued to collaborate and wrote The Knowledge Creating Company. XM leverages a Takeuchi and Nonaka tenet, that the "most powerful learning comes from direct experience" and that "managers in Japan emphasize the importance of learning from direct experience."

== Concept ==
XM uses a prioritized product backlog as the primary work input queue, where work is visualized in an open area generally on a single team Kanban Board. Every XM team has a Scrum Master and also a Product Owner, who together with the team help to ensure that Agile/Lean principles are followed. In XM the Scrum Master has some critical responsibilities, including to:

- communicate with the product owner,
- identify and remove impediments,
- ensure test driven development (TDD) principles are followed, and
- manage team WIP limits, which may vary with team size.

The product owner represents the customer and provides the overall vision and must serve as the product expert.

The Agile Software Development Actors found in Agile and Scrum are present in XM. XM does not require, but does encourage TDD. Ideally, XM should adhere to the 10 principles of XM outlined by Peter Stevens:

1. Optimize for change,
2. Object-oriented, modular architecture,
3. Test-driven development.
4. Contract-first design,
5. Iterate the design,
6. Agile hardware design patterns,
7. Continuous integration development,
8. Continuous deployment development,
9. Scaling patterns, and
10. Partner patterns.

According to Stevens, these "principles and patterns do not represent the final wisdom on Agile manufacturing, but rather a work-in-progress... [toward] the discovery of better ways to manufacture things."

== Contemporary interests ==
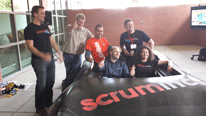
Team Wikispeed and Agile DC conference attendees celebrating success.

Several prototype cars have been developed by separate companies using the XM process.

In 2008, in response to the Automotive X Prize sponsored by Progressive Insurance—a $10 million prize rewarding the design and construction of a car capable of fuel efficiency at the 100 miles per gallon (m.p.g.) mark, while achieving "road-legal safety specifications"—Joe Justice and team Wikispeed, composed of 44 members from 4 countries, used XM to achieve what Fortune magazine called the "seemingly impossible:" application of tools formerly largely devoted to software manufacturing, to the development of a functional automotive prototype in three months' time. Additionally, the car accelerated from 0 to 60 mph in less than 5 seconds. The success—finishing 10th in the mainstream class, and "outrunning more than one hundred other cars from well-funded companies and universities around the world"— led to an invitation to team Wikispeed to showcase their prototype at the Detroit auto show.

Companies use XM as a way to challenge their employees to develop new skills and learn the power of teamwork to solve complex problems. For example, in 2013, Lockheed Martin (Sunnyvale, CA) challenged 200 of its engineers to build a 100 m.p.g. car in a single day; the challenge was met, and the team's car was sold for $25,000. Another such example is opensourceecology.org, whose Global Village Construction Set develops and builds affordable industrial machines and publishes the designs online for free. In a 2015 interview with TED, Open Source Ecology founder Marcin Jakubowski described applying extreme manufacturing to the quick and parallel construction of industrial machines. He said that the organization had shown that a brick press could be built in a single day and had held workshops to build brick presses, hydraulic power units, and microhouses.

== See also ==
- Axiomatic product development lifecycle
- Design–build
- Systems development life-cycle
- New product development
- Product lifecycle management
- Engineering design process
