= GVCS =

GVCS may refer to:

- General Catalogue of Variable Stars, a list of variable stars
- Global Vision Christian School, a private school in South Korea
- Global Village Construction Set, an Open Source Ecology project
- Gardena Valley Christian School, a K-8th grade private school, providing Christian education to the children of southern California's South Bay area in Los Angeles.

Green Valley Christian School

- Global Value Chain, a value chain analytical approach in Development Studies
