= Ironworker (machine) =

Machine that shears and modifies metal plates

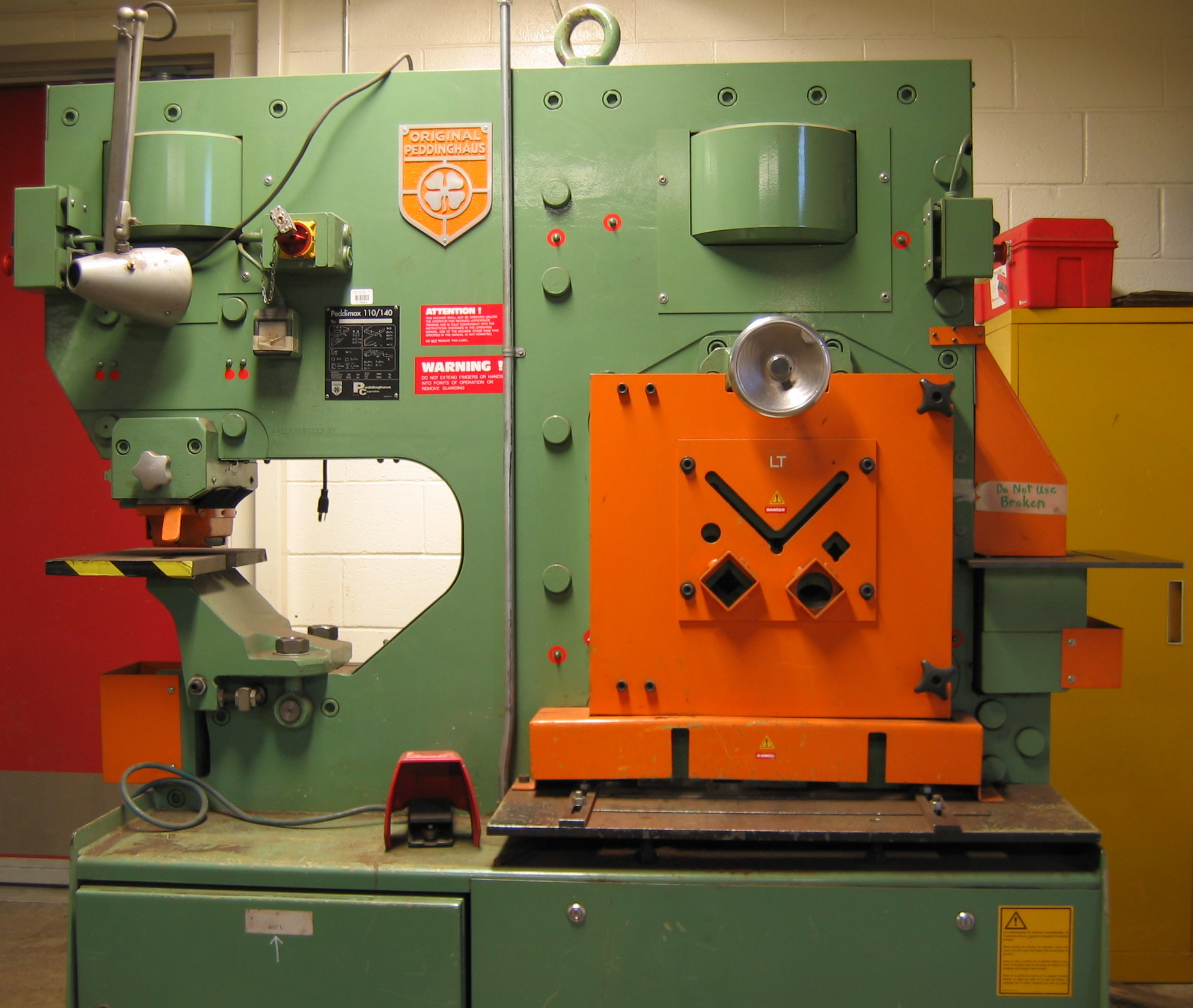
This particular machine stands over 6 ft (1.8 m) tall and can shear, notch, and punch precision holes in plate steel up to 5/8 in (15 mm) thick.

An Ironworker is a class of machine that can shear, notch, and punch holes in steel plate and profiles. Ironworkers generate force using mechanical advantage or hydraulic systems.

The name is now used for machines made by various manufacturers, including the Edwards Manufacturing Company, and may be an example of a genericized trademark.

== History ==
The Ironworker machines made by Edwards evolved from the manually operated metal shear it produced in the 1930s, which was a single blade attached to a long-handled lever which gave its operator enough leverage to cut through metal.

== Overview ==
Modern systems use hydraulic rams powered by a high-powered alternating current electric motor. High strength carbon steel blades and dies of various shapes are used to work the metal. The machine itself is made of very heavy steel to handle the enormous force that can be generated during use. Ironworkers are rated according to the force they can generate in tons; ratings usually start at 20 tons and go as high as 220 tons.

Mechanical ironworkers are mostly used in productions with low temperature in winter (up to −20 °C (−4 °F)) and are considered to be faster. Another reason to choose the mechanical construction is when cutting of large profiles (up to 300 mm (12 in) and bigger) is needed. Most hydraulicals can't cut this size. The disadvantages are the higher power consumption (sometimes double for the same job), the noise and the safety concerns.

== Safety ==
Ironworkers are built with safety in mind, but they still present hazards that must be addressed and thoroughly considered before they are purchased. Most of them have at least 4 stations that require boundaries around them to safely produce parts. They can shear flat plate, angle iron, round and square bar stock as well as punch plates, angles, I-beam and channel iron. Some have a station for notching and forming different types of materials. The area around each station should be at least 20 feet (6 m), since that is the common stock length of most materials used on ironworkers.

== Operations ==
Operations which can be performed include:

- Forming or bending
- Notching
- Punching
- Shearing

== Advantages ==
Due to the reduction in the amount of man hours and effort needed to cut or punch steel sections, an ironworker is often an integral part of commercial manufacturing facilities and fabrication shops. They are easily re-tooled for various operations and can be operated by one person.
