= Edwards Manufacturing Company =

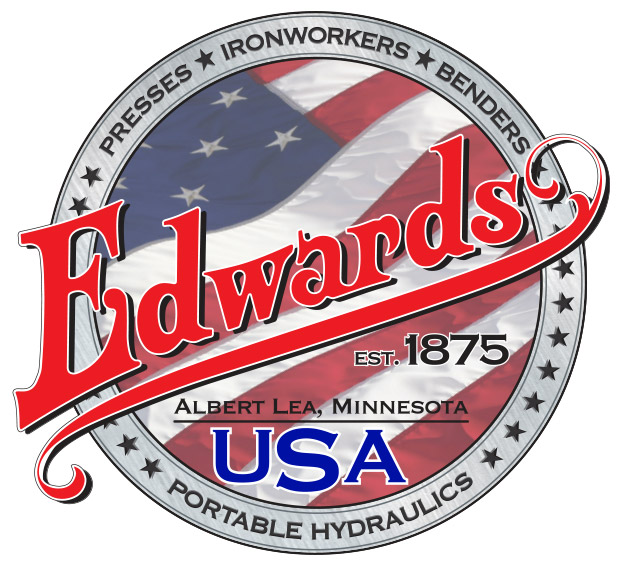
- Industry: Manufacturing
- Founded: 1875 in Albert Lea, MN, USA
- Founder: Charles Douglas Edwards
- Headquarters: Albert Lea, USA
- Products: Hydraulic Ironworkers, Pipe Benders, Shop Presses
- Website: edwardsironworkers.com

Edwards Manufacturing Company is a business in Albert Lea, Minnesota that manufactures Hydraulic Ironworkers.

== History ==
Manufacturing since 1875 Edwards began with road graders, and other manufacturing equipment such as the stump puller, Manual Shears, and Intake Grates.

== Ironworkers ==
Edwards Manufacturing Company manufactures Ironworkers and hydraulic equipment. Ironworkers are machines that speed up fabrication by punching and shearing opposed to drilling or using a saw. Edwards Ironworkers can have a Hydraulic Accessory Pack that allows separate machinery to plug into the Ironworker and use the Ironworker's hydraulic power. Edwards Manufacturing Company has a line of 12 ironworkers and 5 Hydraulic Accessories as of 2015.

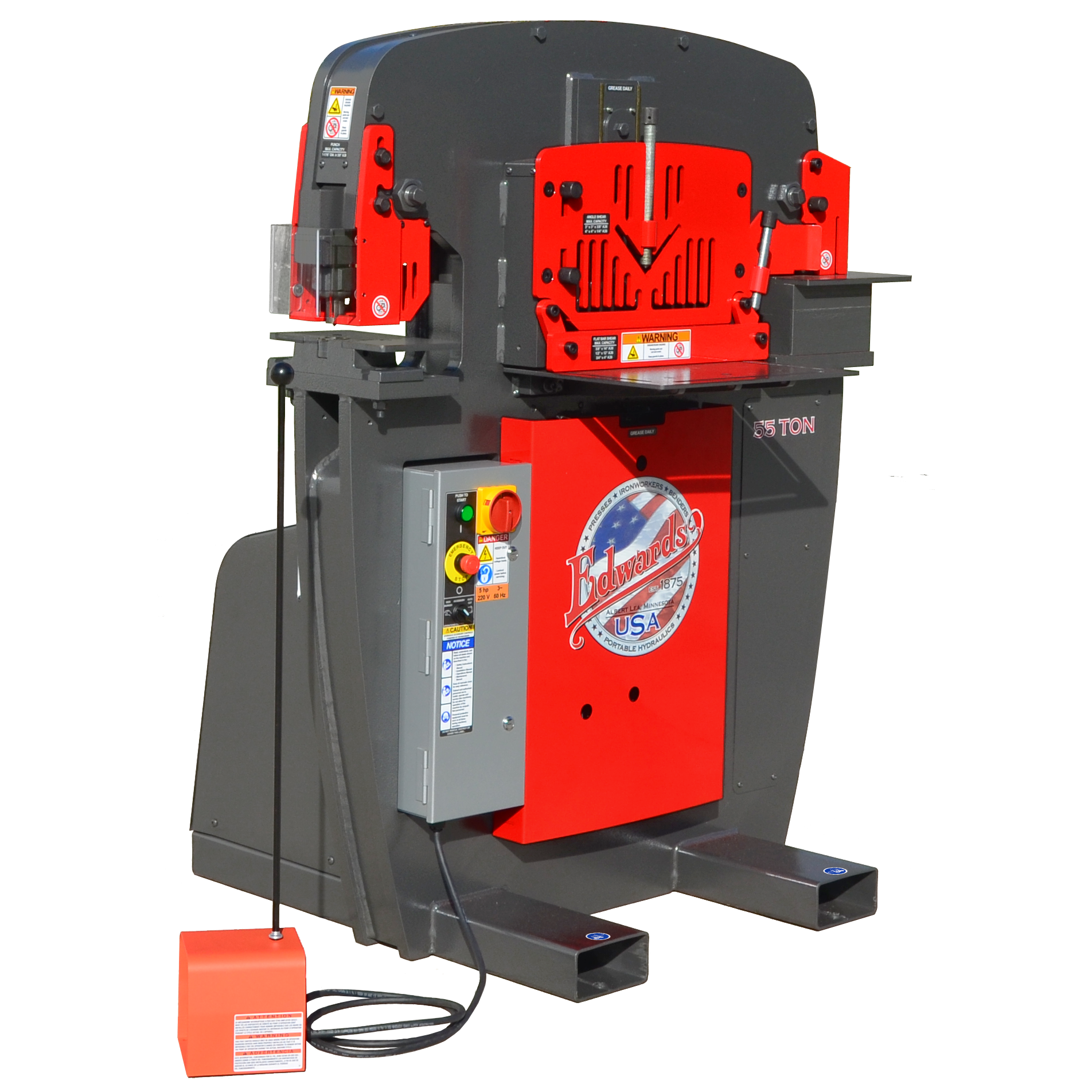
55 Ton Ironworker
