= AguaClara =

AguaClara Cornell
- Founded: 2005
- Founder: Monroe Weber-Shirk
- Type: Nonprofit organization
- Purpose: Sustainable Water Treatment
- Location: Ithaca, NY
- Method: Open Source Technology
- Members: ~80
- Key people: Monroe Weber-Shirk - Program Director
- Website: aguaclara.cornell.edu

AguaClara Cornell is an engineering based project team within Cornell University's College of Engineering that designs sustainable water treatment plants using open source technology. The program's mission is to uphold and protect “the fundamental human right to access safe drinking water. We are committed to the ongoing development of resilient, gravity-powered drinking water and wastewater treatment technologies.” AguaClara plants are unique among municipal-scale facilities in that they have no electrical or complex mechanical components and instead operate through hydraulic processes driven by gravity.

The AguaClara Cornell program provides undergraduate and graduate students the opportunity to enhance their education through hands-on experience working on projects with real applications. In 2012, the National Academy of Engineering showcased AguaClara as one of the 29 engineering program at US colleges that effectively incorporates real world experiences in their curriculum.

In 2017, a non-profit organization, AguaClara Reach, was formed with the continued mission of bringing clean drinking water on tap to communities around the world. AguaClara Reach works with AguaClara Cornell to pilot the latest open-source innovations developed in the lab, while sharing lessons learned from the field to drive further research.

In Honduras, implementation partner Agua Para el Pueblo (Water for People), a NGO working in Honduras who manages the construction and technical support for AguaClara plants. AguaClara Reach partners with Gram Vikas in India to build Hydrodosers. The Hydrodoser, an AguaClara technology, is a modular, easy to install unit that, on its own, can be used to dose chlorine to disinfect water that has no more than 5 NTU of turbidity, which is typical of well water.

== History ==
AguaClara was formed in 2005 by Cornell University senior lecturer Monroe Weber-Shirk, who volunteered in Central American refugee camps during the 1980s. Weber-Shirk used the connections he developed through his volunteer work to partner with Jacabo Nuñez, the director of Agua para el Pueblo to find the answer to a crucial question: What can we do to treat the dirty water that we are providing to rural communities?

In 2005, he founded the AguaClara program to address the need for sustainable municipal scale water treatment in resource poor communities. The first AguaClara plant was built in 2006 in Ojojona to serve a population of 2000 people. Since 2005, Agua Para el Pueblo has commissioned eighteen drinking water treatment facilities implementing AguaClara technology across Honduras. Upon request of local communities in neighboring Nicaragua, an additional two facilities were commissioned in that country in 2017.

In 2017 with the founding of AguaClara Reach, the project team appended Cornell to its name to distinguish it from its non-profit counterpart.

== Design tool ==
AguaClara Cornell has developed an automated design tool that allows interested parties to input basic design parameters such as flow rate into a simple frontend and receive customized designs via email in five minutes or less. The user frontend communicates with the AguaClara server to populate MathCad scripts that calculate design parameters for input into AutoCAD scripts, which produce the final design. The design algorithms can be continuously improved and any changes will be immediately implemented the next time a design is requested.

The AguaClara design tool applies an economy of scale to water treatment design, in that there are almost no marginal costs to produce an additional design. This is significant considering that the World Health Organization estimates the global unmet demand for improved water at approximately 844 million people, including 100 million using surface water sources that would be viable for treatment with AguaClara technology. From the AguaClara website:

Thus 125 million people need AguaClara water treatment plants. If we further assume that our goal is to meet this demand in 10 years and that there are an average of 12,000 people per water treatment plant, we obtain an estimate of 1000 plants per year! This estimate does not include population growth or the need to replace aging infrastructure.

== Plants ==
AguaClara designs gravity-powered water treatment plants that require no electricity and are constructed by its implementation partners. The plants use hydraulic flocculators and high-flow vertical-flow sedimentation tanks in order to remove turbidity from surface waters.

| Location | Partner | Construction Start | Inauguration Date | Population Served | Design flow (LPM) |
|---|---|---|---|---|---|
| Ojojona, HON | APP | 2006 June | 2007 July | 2000 | 375 |
| Tamara, HON | APP | 2008 January | 2008 June | 3500 | 720 |
| Marcala, HON | IRWA | 2007 October | 2008 July | 9000 | 1900 |
| 4 Comunidades, HON | APP | 2008 October | 2009 March | 2000 | 375 |
| Agalteca, HON | APP | 2009 October | 2010 June | 2200 | 375 |
| Marcala, HON Expansion | APP/ACRA | 2010 November | 2011 May | 6000 | 1300 |
| Alauca, El Paraiso, HON | APP | May 2011 | February 2012 | 3600 | 720 |
| Atima, Santa Barbara, HON | APP | December 2011 | May 2012 | 4000 | 960 |
| San Nicolás, Santa Barbara, HON | APP | June 2013 | April 2014 | 6000 | 1920 |
| Morocelí, El Paraiso, HON | APP | March 2014 | January 2016 | 5300 | 960 |
| Jesús de Otoro, Intibucá, HON | APP | March 2014 | January 2015 | 5000 | 1200 |
| San Matías, El Paraiso, HON | APP | February 2015 | March 2016 | 3500 | 840 |

La 34, or "La treinta y quatro," once a numbered plantation run by United Fruit, is the first site of an AguaClara plant. Construction on the La 34 plant began in December 2004 and was inaugurated in August 2005. The plant serves a population of 2000 with a design flow of 285 LPM.

Marcala The Marcala plant began in the fall of 2007 and was completed in June 2008. The plant was upgraded in May 2011 to a flow rate of 3200 LPM.

Cuatro Comunidades In the fall of 2008, the AguaClara team designed a water treatment plant with shallower tanks that doesn't need an elevated platform for the plant operator. The full scale pilot facility for this new design was built for the four communities of Los Bayos, Rio Frio, Aldea Bonito and Las Jaguas. Construction was completed in March 2009.

== Sponsors ==
- The Sanjuan Fund
- Ken Brown '74 & Elizabeth Sanjuan
- Rotary Clubs
- Cornell University School of Civil & Environmental Engineering
- Cornell University College of Engineering
- Engineers for a Sustainable World
- National Rural Water Association
- EPA P3 Award Student design competition for sustainability
- Kaplan Family Distinguished Faculty Fellowships (CU Public Service)

== Awards and recognition ==
- 2012 NAE "Infusing World Experiences into Engineering Education"
- 2011 Intel Environment Tech Award

== See also ==
- Water purification
- Cornell University

== Notes and references ==
- This article incorporates text from the old AguaClara website and the new AguaClara website, licensed under a Creative Commons Attribution-Share Alike 3.0 United States License.
