= Profile (engineering) =

Engineering concept; subset internal to a specification

In standardization, a profile is a subset internal to a specification. Aspects of a complex technical specification may necessarily have more than one interpretation, and there are probably many optional features. These aspects constitute a profile of the standard. Two implementations engineered from the same description may not interoperate due to having a different profile of the standard. Vendors can even ignore features that they view as unimportant, yet prevail in the long run.

The use of profiles in these ways can force one interpretation, or create de facto standards from official standards. Engineers can design or procure by using a profile to ensure interoperability. For example, the International Standard Profile, ISP, is used by the ISO in their ISO ISP series of standards; in the context of OSI networking, Britain uses the UK-GOSIP profile and the US uses US-GOSIP; there are also various mobile profiles adopted by the W3C for web standards. In particular, implementations of standards on mobile devices often have significant limitations compared to their traditional desktop implementations, even if the standard which governs both permits such limitations.

In structural engineering a profile means a hot rolled structural steel shape like an Ɪ-beam.

In civil engineering, a profile consists of a plotted line which indicates grades and distances (and typically depths of cut and/or elevations of fill) for excavation and grading work. Constructors of roadways, railways (and similar works) normally chart the profile along the centerline. A profile can also indicate the vertical slope(s) (changes in elevation) in a pipeline or similar structure. Civil engineers always depict profile as a side (cross section) view (as opposed to an overhead (plan) view).

== Material fabrication ==
In fabricating, a profile consists of the more-or-less complex outline of a shape to be cut in a sheet of material such as laminated plastic, aluminium alloy or steel plate. In modern practice, a drawing office determines the shape and dimensions required to fit the sheet into a larger work and feeds directions to a computer controlling a profile cutter. This then cuts the shape from a standard-sized sheet. The cutting head may use a rotating cutter like that of a spindle router or (in the case of steel plate) a torch which burns oxy-acetylene or other oxy-gas.

== See also ==
- Hollow structural section
- Metal profiles
- Rail profile
- Structural steel
