= Marcin Jakubowski =

Founder of Open Source Ecology (born 1972)

- Born: 1972 (age 53–54); Poznań, Poland
- Education: Princeton University (BA, Chemistry), University of Wisconsin–Madison (PhD, Physics)
- Organization: Open Source Ecology
- Website: opensourceecology.org

Marcin Jakubowski (born 1972) is a Polish American physicist and entrepreneur best known as the founder of Open Source Ecology (OSE), a project dedicated to developing open source industrial machines and tools for sustainable living.

== Career ==
Jakubowski founded Open Source Ecology in 2003 after earning his PhD in physics from the University of Wisconsin–Madison. The project’s goal is to create the Global Village Construction Set (GVCS), a modular collection of open source machines designed to support small-scale, self-sufficient communities through distributed manufacturing and open design principles.

Jakubowski presented his work in a widely viewed TED talk titled Open-Sourced Blueprints for Civilization in 2011, which helped bring international attention to the OSE project. Following the talk, OSE received media coverage from outlets such as Make magazine, Gizmodo, and Grist, and won Make magazine’s “Green Project Contest” the same year.

In 2012, Jakubowski became a Shuttleworth Foundation Fellow and a TED Fellow.

Most of OSE’s research and prototyping activities take place at Factor e Farm, the organization’s headquarters in rural Missouri.

In 2016, Jakubowski and researcher Catarina Mota co-founded the Open Building Institute (OBI), which focuses on developing open source tools and methods for affordable, sustainable housing.

== Personal life ==
Jakubowski was born in Poznań, Poland. He married Catarina Mota in December 2013 in New York City. They continue to collaborate on open source hardware and housing initiatives.

== See also ==
- Open source hardware
- Distributed manufacturing
- Open source appropriate technology
