= Tiago do Vale =

Portuguese architect (born 1978)

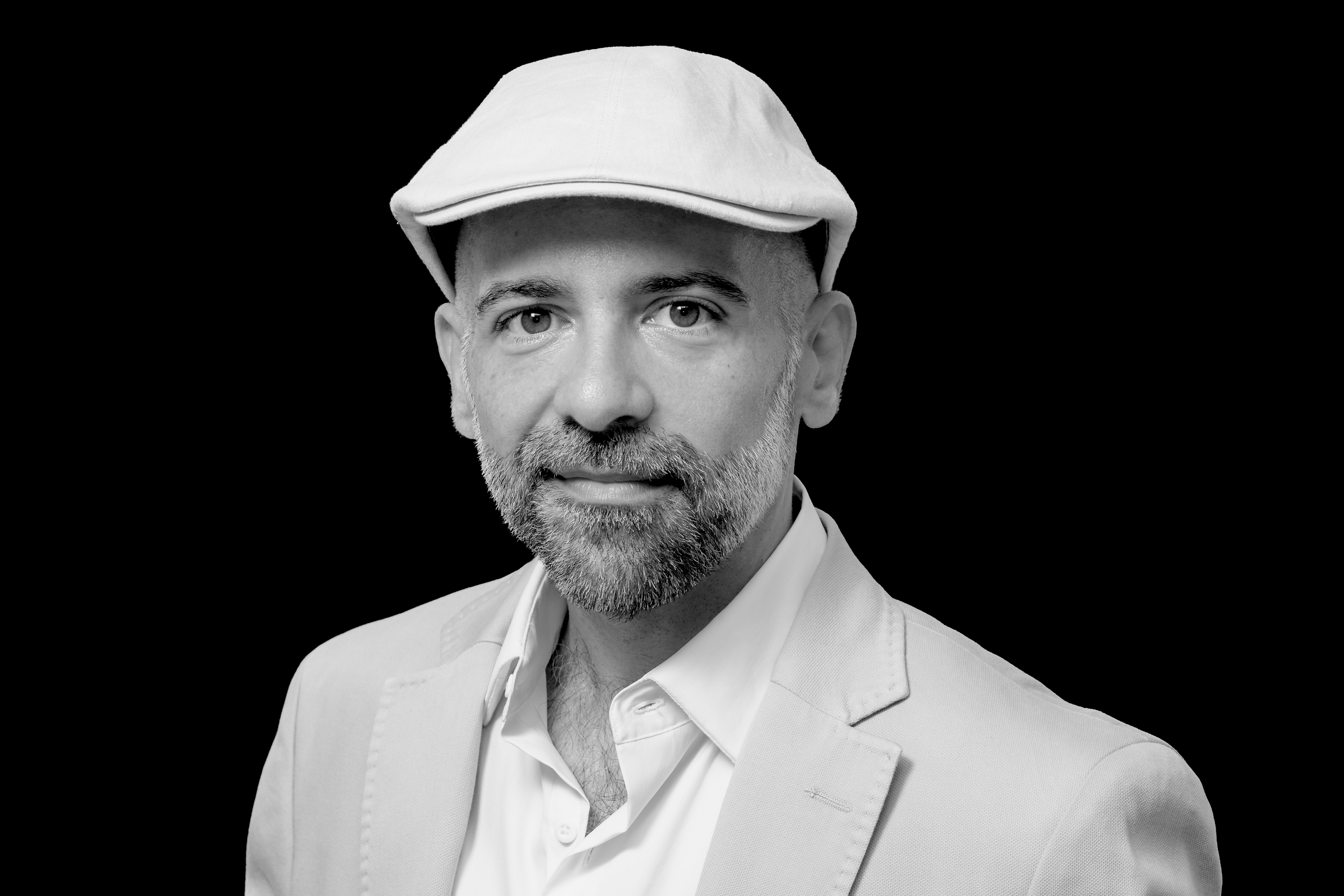
- Do Vale in 2022
- Born: 4 August 1978 (age 48)
- Education: University of Coimbra
- Occupation: Architect
- Awards: 2022 LOOP Design Awards (Best Small Architecture Firm); 2019 Architecture Masterprize (Small Firm of the Year); 2018 Architizer A+Awards (double 1st prize); 2017 American Architecture Prize (1st prize); 2015 Architizer A+Awards (1st prize); 2014 ArchDaily Building of the Year (1st prize)
- Practice: Tiago do Vale Architects
- Website: www.tiagodovale.com

Tiago do Vale (European Portuguese pronunciation: [ˈtjaɣu ðu ˈvalɨ]; born 4 August 1978) is a Portuguese architect. He heads the architectural practice Tiago do Vale Architects.

== Background and education ==
Do Vale was born in 1978 in the north of Portugal. He enrolled in the University of Coimbra's Department of Architecture in 1996 studying, among others, under Fernando Távora and Gonçalo Byrne. He went on to integrate the University of Coimbra's managing bodies, both as a Senator and as an Assembly Member.

Postgraduate on Advanced Studies in Architectural Heritage by the Porto School of Architecture.

== Career ==
Tiago do Vale regularly lectures and writes about architectural matters.

Do Vale was curator of the 2014's "Urban Dialogues, International Architecture Congress", in Portugal and of the 2015, 2016, 2017, 2018 and 2019 editions of the “Mesturas, International Architecture Encounters Galicia-Portugal” (Spain and Portugal).

He was juror for the 2016 and 2017 DAS Awards in Moldavia, for the 2016 and 2017 editions of the João de Almada Award in Portugal, for the Architecture MasterPrize since its 2020 edition in the United States of America, and for the Muse Design Awards since 2020 in the United States of America.

== Awards ==
- 2014: ArchDaily Building of the Year Awards, First Prize (Refurbishment)
- 2014: Institute of Housing and Urban Renewal Award, First Honorable Mention
- 2015: Architizer A+ Awards, First Prize (Architecture +Preservation)
- 2016: American Architecture Prize, Third Prize (Heritage Architecture)
- 2017: COAG Architecture Awards, Finalist (Research and Dissemination)
- 2017: American Architecture Prize, First Prize (Interior Design, Retail)
- 2018: International Design Awards, Third Prize (Sustainable Living)
- 2018: Architizer A+Awards, Double First Prize (Architecture +Preservation)
- 2018: Global Architecture & Design Awards, Honorable Mention (Interior Design, Retail)
- 2018: International Architecture Awards, Third Prize (Interior Design, Commercial)
- 2018: Blueprint Awards, First Prize (Best Sustainable Project)
- 2018: Architecture MasterPrize, Honorable Mention (Small Architecture)
- 2019: Muse Design Awards, Platinum Award (Historic Restoration), Gold Award (Sustainable Living) and Gold Award (Residential)
- 2019: Baku International Architecture Award, First Prize (Historic Interior Restoration) and Honorable Mention (Rehabilitation and Reconstruction of Historic Building)
- 2019: Architecture Masterprize, Small Firm of the Year (Multi-Disciplinary Architecture)
- 2020: DNA Paris Design Awards, Winner (Green Architecture)
- 2021: International Design Awards, Bronze Prize (Residencial Architecture)
- 2021: LOOP Design Awards, Honorable Mention (Sustainable Architecture)
- 2022: LOOP Design Awards, Winner (Best Small Architecture Firm Award), Winner (Best Renovation Firm Award) and Winner (Design & Small Scale)
- 2025: Houzee Awards, Platinum Award (Condominium and Apartment)
- 2025: Japan Design Award, Silver Prize (Architecture)
- 2025: LOOP Design Awards, Winner (Multi Unit Housing), Winner (Retail, Shops and Stores) and Winner (healthcare)

== Publications ==
- Tiago do Vale, Urban Complex, Design Media Publishing Ltd 2014, 288 pages, ISBN 978-9881-29675-7
- Tiago do Vale, 城市综合体, Liaoning Science and Technology Publishing House Ltd 2014, 285 pages, ISBN 978-7538-18736-6
- Tiago do Vale Projetos / Projects, Archi&Book's, 168 pages, ISSN 1646-2262
- Tiago do Vale Arquitectos, Congresso das Garrafas / Recesso das Garrafas, Caleidoscópio, 64 pages, ISBN 978-9896-58921-9
