= Metal profiles =

Building materials

Metal profile sheet systems are used to build cost efficient and reliable envelopes of mostly commercial buildings. They have evolved from the single skin metal cladding often associated with agricultural buildings to multi-layer systems for industrial and leisure application. As with most construction components, the ability of the cladding to satisfy its functional requirements is dependent on its correct specification and installation. Also important is its interaction with other elements of the building envelope and structure. Metal profile sheets are metal structural members that due to the fact they can have different profiles, with different heights and different thickness, engineers and architects can use them for a variety of buildings, from a simple industrial building to a high demand design building. Trapezoidal profiles are large metal structural members, which, thanks to the profiling and thickness, retain their high load bearing capability. They have been developed from the corrugated profile. The profile programme offered by specific manufacturers covers a total of approximately 60 profile shapes with different heights. Cassettes are components that are mainly used as the inner shell in dual-shell wall constructions. They are mainly used in walls today, even though they were originally designed for use in roofs.

== History ==
Trapezoidal profiles and cassettes have been known in Europe for around 100 years. Today's characteristic profile shape came to Europe from the USA in the 50s and has gained relevance since about 1960. At present the proportion of load bearing, room sealing trapezoidal profiles used in the overall area of new and slightly sloping roofs amounts to 90%. Above all else the wide acceptance has resulted from the simple constructive training, fast assembly, and the low costs of the trapezoidal profile construction.

== Specification of the metal profile ==
=== Weathertightness ===
The primary function of the cladding system is to provide a weathertight building envelope, suitable for the intended use of the building. Trapezoidal metal roof sheets with through fix fasteners are generally suitable for slopes of 4% or steeper. This limit is critical to the performance of the cladding. For shallower pitches, down to 1.5%, a fix system with no exposed through fasteners, special side laps and preferably no end laps should be used. For low pitch roof, ponding is a potential problem that must be considered at the design stage in order to avoid the deleterious effects of prolonged soaking and the increased loading, due to the weight of the water.

=== Building appearance ===
Building envelope made from metal sheet provide builders and architects with products, which meet all of the highest demand regarding construction characteristics and design. The steel from which profiled cladding sheets are made is available pre-coated in a wide range of colors and textures, allowing architects to choose a finish that best suits the location and function of the building. Profile shape is also a characteristic that can be adapted to the demand of the architects.

=== Thermal performance ===
Buildings are responsible of the 40% of European energy consumption, consequently, improving the thermal performance of the cladding and associated components is very important. The elemental U-value (thermal transmittance, W/m2K) of a cladding panel, depends on the conductivity and thickness of the insulation which is added, the profile shape and the presence of thermal bridges. So, metal profile sheets can achieve thermal performance regulations thanks of insulations and profile shape. It is very important to analyze and avoid all possible thermal bridges within the roof and wall cladding assembly, to minimize local heat/cold losses.

=== Acoustics ===
Roofs constructed with trapezoidal profiles have excellent sound suppression characteristics. Sound has been found to be reduced to by up to 53 dB. The measured sound reduction for wall constructions using cassettes has been assessed at an RW of 57 dB. The acoustic performance of a particular cladding system will depend on the insulation material, the weather sheet and liner sheet profiles and the method of assembly. To minimize reverberation architects may take advantage of the sound absorbing properties of the cladding insulation layer by replacing the standard liner sheet with a perforated liner.

=== Durability ===
In order to ensure that the building envelope remains fully functional throughout its design life, it is important that it receives regular maintenance, including inspection, removal of debris, cleaning and repair of damage. Inspection can include man-made or natural wear. Weather exposure, natural movement, installation error and manufacturing defects are examples. The need of maintenance may be greatly reduced using specific coating depending on the weather conditions, this coating guarantee the expected design life of the cladding. The commonly used 302 stainless steel alone is resistant to acetic acid, acetone and boric acid, among others.

=== Sustainability ===
Metal profiles sheets have a high recycled scrap steel content and all steel is recyclable. Many steel components can be unbolted and even reused for future applications. The possibility of reusing building elements makes steel construction even more sustainable than the already significant contribution of today's simple material recycling. Steel can be repeatedly recycled because it does not lose any of its inherent physical properties as a result of the recycling process. Stainless steel fasteners have excellent corrosion resistance and durability, as well as being a sustainable material. Custom fasteners in this material make for the utmost of sustainability with high recyclability.

=== Structural performance ===
Metal cladding systems are required to carry externally applied loads, such as snow and wind loading without deflecting excessively or compromising the other performance requirements. The individual characteristic loads (actions) should be obtained from the appropriate part of EN 1991, taking into account the building geometry and location as applicable. These individual actions should then be combined using the appropriate safety factors from EN 1990 to obtain the load cases used in design.

- Permanent actions:

For most application of metal cladding technology, the only permanent action which the roof cladding needs to be designed is its own self-weight. For wall cladding, it is not normally necessary to consider permanent actions, since the self-weight acts in the plan of the cladding.

- Variable actions:

In addition to its self-weight, the roof cladding must also be designed for the following variable actions as specified in the appropriate parts of EN 1991: -Access for cleaning and maintenance. -A uniformly distributed load due to snow over the complete roof area. The value of this load will depend on the building's location. -Asymmetric snow load and loading due to snow drifts. -Wind loading due to pressure and suction.

- Deflections:

Care must be taken on site to avoid excessive local deflection. Typical deflection limits imposed on the cladding are depend on the loading regime considered, the location of the structural component and whether a brittle material is present. Deflection limits may be specifies by National regulation.

== Main uses ==
Metal profile sheets due to their versatility mechanical and design properties can be used as roof and roof cladding, as external walls and wall cladding and also as floors. They are used in industry and in residential sector, and the two sectors can be used in both new construction and rehabilitation. Some of the applications where metal profile sheets are used are:

- industrial buildings,
- commercial buildings,
- public buildings,
- sport buildings,
- educational buildings,
- offices and administration buildings,
- multi-story buildings
- power plants,
- residential house,
- high design demand buildings,
- etc.

== See also ==
- Profile (engineering)
- Hollow structural section
- Eurocode
- Insulation
- Architecture
