= Open Source Ecology =

Ecology organisation

- Abbreviation: OSE
- Formation: 2003; 23 years ago
- Headquarters: Factor e Farm
- Location: Maysville, Missouri, US
- Region served: Worldwide
- ED: Marcin Jakubowski
- Website: www.opensourceecology.org

Open Source Ecology: Practical post scarcity

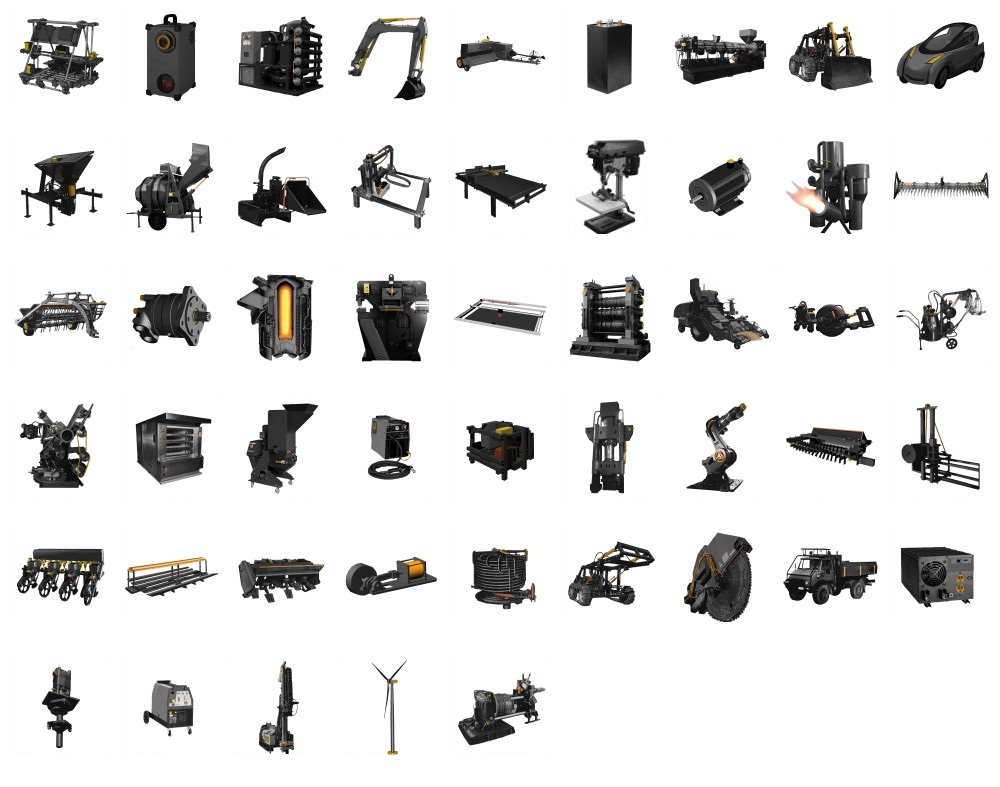
The 50 machines that compose the Global Village Construction Set

Open Source Ecology (OSE) is a network of farmers, engineers, architects and supporters, whose main goal is the eventual manufacturing of the Global Village Construction Set (GVCS). As described by Open Source Ecology "the GVCS is an open technological platform that allows for the easy fabrication of the 50 types of industrial machines that it takes to build a small civilization with modern comforts". Groups in Oberlin, Ohio, Pennsylvania, New York and California are developing blueprints, and building prototypes in order to test them on the Factor e Farm in rural Missouri. 3D-Print.com reports that OSE has been experimenting with RepRap 3D printers, as suggested by academics for sustainable development.

== History ==
Marcin Jakubowski founded the group in 2003. In the final year of his doctoral thesis at the University of Wisconsin, he felt that his work was too closed off from the world's problems, and he wanted to go a different way. After graduation, he devoted himself entirely to OSE.

OSE made it to the world stage in 2011 when Jakubowski presented his Global Village Construction Set TED Talk. Soon, the GVCS won Make magazine's Green Project Contest. The Internet blogs Gizmodo and Grist produced detailed features on OSE. Jakubowski has since become a Shuttleworth Foundation Fellow (2012) and TED Senior Fellow (2012).

Open Source Ecology is also developing in Europe as OSE Germany. This is an independent effort based on OSE's principles.

In 2016, OSE and the Open Building Institute joined forces to make affordable, ecological housing widely accessible. The initiative has prototyped the Seed Eco-Home – a 1400 square foot home with the help of 50 people in a 5-day period – demonstrating that OSE's Extreme Manufacturing techniques can be applied to rapid swarm builds of large structures. Materials for the Seed Eco-Home cost around US$30,000 in 2016, though the cost went up to approximately US$50,000 in 2022 due to rising lumber prices. Further, OBI has prototyped the Aquaponic Greenhouse – which was also built in 5 days with 50 people.

== Factor e Farm ==
The Factor e Farm is the headquarters where the machines are prototyped and tested. The farm also serves as a prototype. Using the Open Source Ecology principles, Four prototype modules have been built as a home. An added greenhouse demonstrates how a family can grow vegetables and fish. Outside, there is also a large garden including fruit trees.

== Current progress ==
In October 2011 a Kickstarter fundraising campaign collected US$63,573 for project expenses and the construction of a training facility. The project has been funded by the Shuttleworth Foundation and is a semifinalist in the Focus Forward Film Festival.

In 2014, 12 of the 50 machines were designed, blueprinted, and prototyped, with four of those reaching the documentation stage.

In 2018, the project achieved 33% completion.

In 2019, OSE updated its vision to collaborative design for a transparent and inclusive economy of abundance.

For 2020, OSE planned a collaborative design effort by hosting an Incentive Challenge on the HeroX platform, with the goal to produce a professional-grade, open source, 3D printed cordless drill that could be manufactured around the world. The project was intended to provide a proof-of-concept for the efficiency of open-source hardware development. This effort was postponed due to COVID-19, and OSE has pivoted to a product release of the Seed Eco-Home in 2021 to address the need for affordable, ecological housing.

Powercube v7 Assembly video

Liberator Compressed Earth Brick Press v4 Assembly video

LifeTrac tractor – Design Rationale

LifeTrac tractor – Fabrication Report

LifeTrac tractor- Fabrication Drawings

== Awards and recognition ==
- From 2012 to 2014, Dr. Jakubowski was awarded a Shuttleworth Foundation Fellowship.
- In 2011, the project won the Green Project Contest organized by Make magazine.
- It was one of the 21 semi-finalists for the Buckminster Fuller Challenge, among 162 participants.
- TIME magazine rated OSE's Civilization Starter Kit as a top invention of the year 2012.

== List of machines ==
The Global Village Construction Set (GVCS) comprises 50 industrial machines:

Category	Global Village Construction Set (GVCS)
Habitat	Compressed earth block press v4 · Concrete mixer · Sawmill · Bulldozer · Backhoe
Agriculture	Tractor: LifeTrac v3 · Seeder · Hay rake · Microtractor · Rototiller · Spader · Hay cutter · Trencher · Bakery oven · Dairy milking machine · Microcombine harvester · Baler · Well-drilling rig
Industry	Multimachine (milling machine, drill press, and lathe) · Ironworker · Laser cutter · Welder · Plasma cutter · Induction furnace · CNC torch table · Metal roller · Wire and rod mill · Press forge · Universal rotor · Drill press · 3D printer · 3D scanner · CNC circuit mill · Industrial robot · Woodchipper / Hammermill
Energy	Power Cube: PowerCube v7 · Gasifier burner · Solar concentrator · Electric motor / generator · Hydraulic motor · Nickel–iron battery · Steam engine · Steam generator · Wind turbine · Pelletizer · Universal power supply
Materials	Aluminium extractor · Bioplastic extruder
Transportation	Car · Truck

== GVCS replication ==
The first time a Global Village Construction Set product was created by another group was in October 2011; Jason Smith with James Slade and his organization Creation Flame developed a functioning open source CEB press.

== See also ==
- 3D printing
- Eco-cities
- eXtreme Manufacturing
- Fab lab
- Free software
- Ivan Illich – seminal figure in de-institutionalizing of education and appropriate modern technology
- List of open-source hardware projects
- Long Now Foundation
- MakerBot
- Maker culture
- Open design
- Open source
- Open-source hardware
- Open-source appropriate technology
- Open-source movement
- RepRap – a free and open-source software (FOSS) 3D printer
- Sustainable city
- The Knowledge: How to Rebuild Our World from Scratch (book)
- The Open-Source Lab: How to Build Your Own Hardware and Reduce Research Costs
- Transition towns – a grassroots network of communities that are working to build resilience in response to peak oil, climate destruction, and economic instability.
