= Open-design movement =

Movement for publicly shared designs

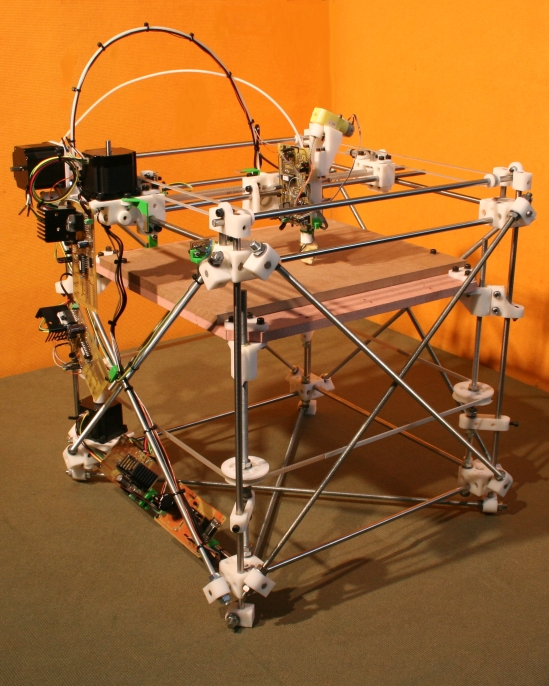
RepRap general-purpose 3D printer that not only could be used to make structures and functional components for open-design projects but is an open-source project itself

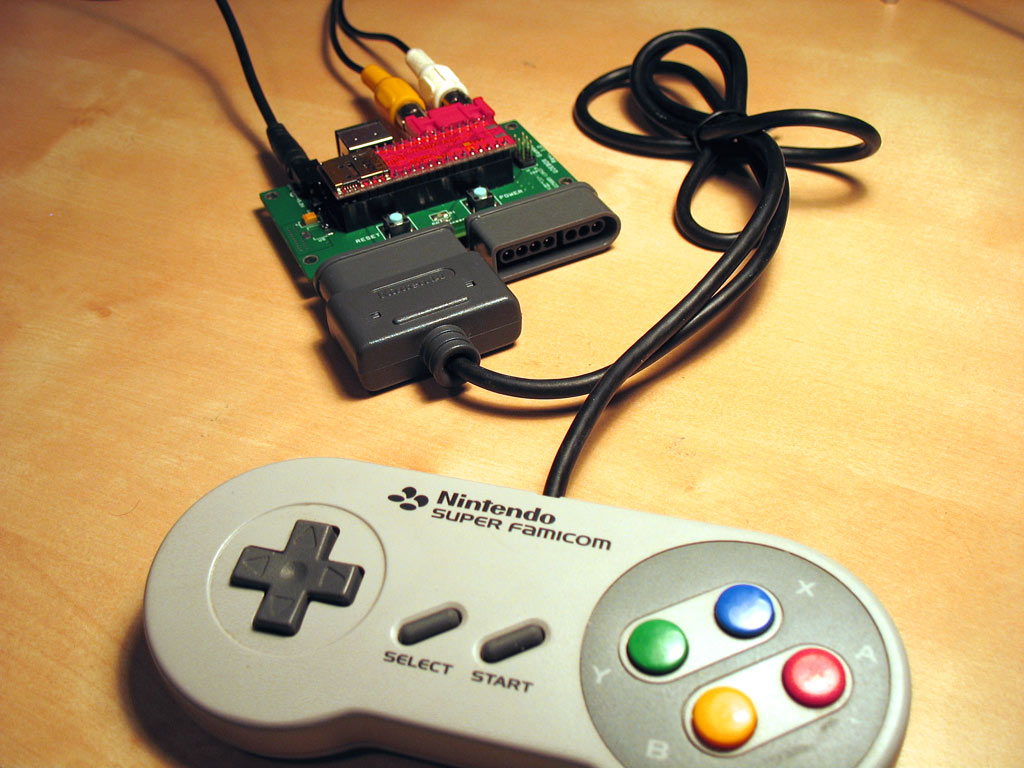
Uzebox, an open-design video game console

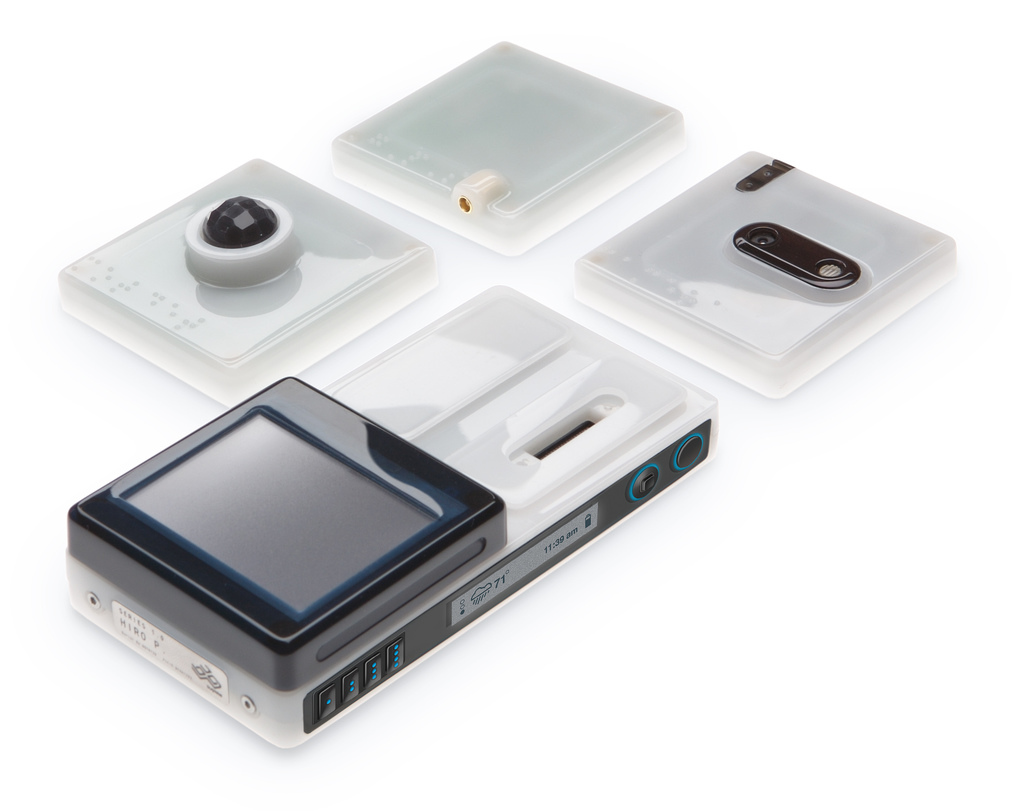
Bug Labs open source hardware

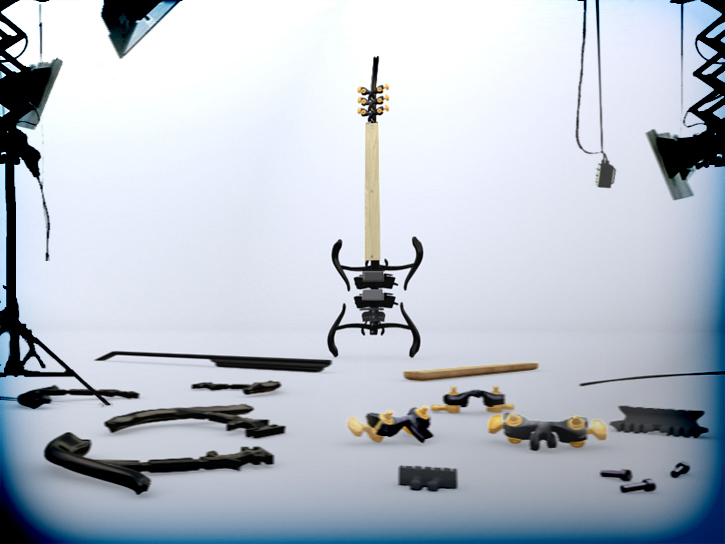
Zoybar open source guitar kit with 3D-printed body

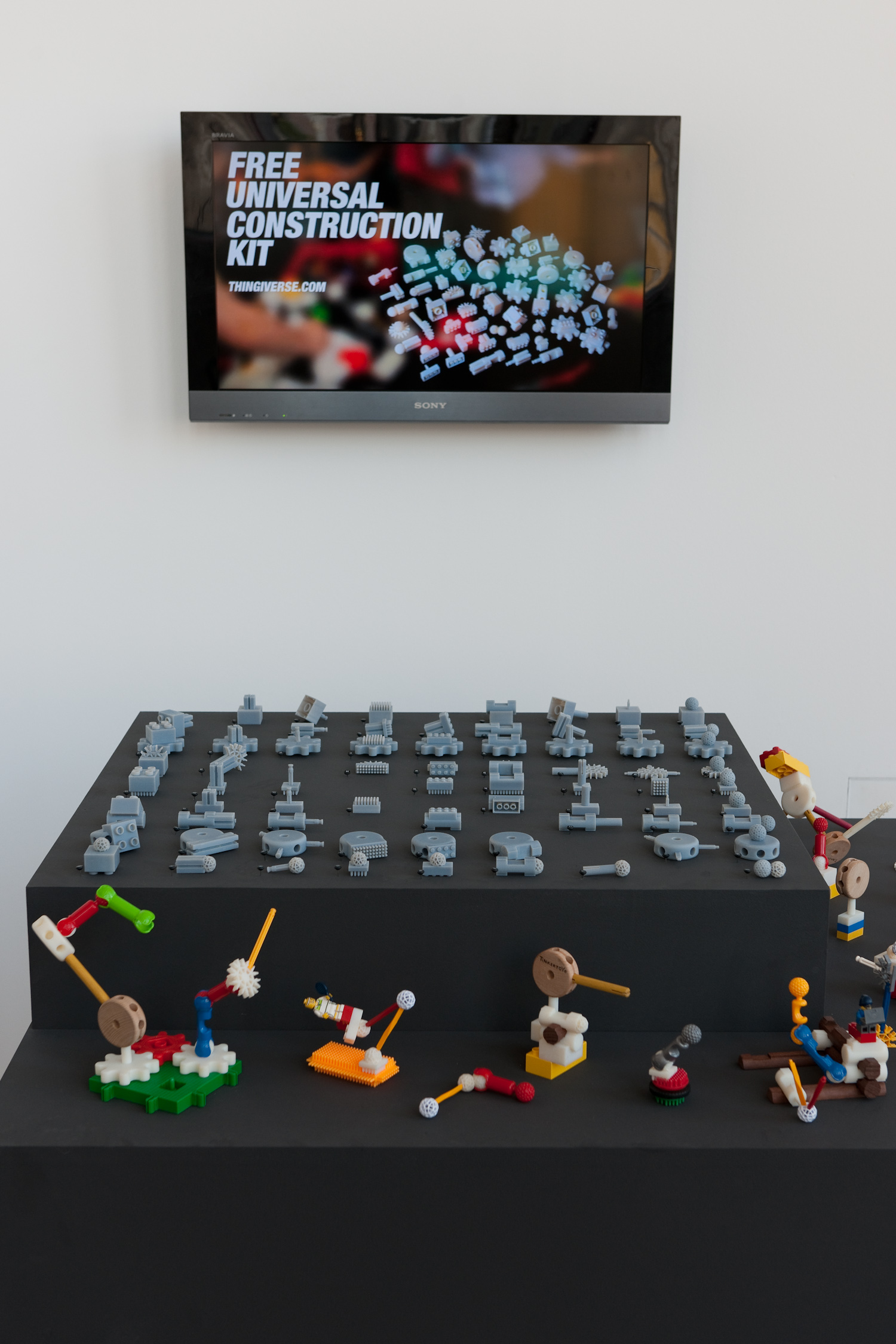
Free Universal Construction Kit by Golan Levin and Shawn Sims, Ars Electronica exhibition, Offenes Kulturhaus museum, Linz, Austria (2012)

The open-design movement involves the development of physical products, machines and systems through use of publicly shared design information. This includes the making of both free and open-source software (FOSS) as well as open-source hardware. The process is generally facilitated by the Internet and often performed without monetary compensation. The goals and philosophy of the movement are identical to that of the open-source movement, but are implemented for the development of physical products rather than software. Open design is a form of co-creation, where the final product is designed by the users, rather than an external stakeholder such as a private company.

== History ==
Sharing of manufacturing information can be traced back to the 18th and 19th century. Aggressive patenting put an end to that period of extensive knowledge sharing. More recently, principles of open design have been related to the free and open-source software movements. In 1997 Eric S. Raymond, Tim O'Reilly and Larry Augustin established "open source" as an alternative expression to "free software", and in 1997 Bruce Perens published The Open Source Definition. In late 1998, Dr. Sepehr Kiani (a PhD in mechanical engineering from MIT) realized that designers could benefit from open source policies, and in early 1999 he convinced Dr. Ryan Vallance and Dr. Samir Nayfeh of the potential benefits of open design in machine design applications. Together they established the Open Design Foundation (ODF) as a non-profit corporation, and set out to develop an Open Design Definition.

The idea of open design was taken up, either simultaneously or subsequently, by several other groups and individuals. The principles of open design are closely similar to those of open-source hardware design, which emerged in March 1998 when Reinoud Lamberts of the Delft University of Technology proposed on his "Open Design Circuits" website the creation of a hardware design community in the spirit of free software.

Ronen Kadushin coined the title "Open Design" in his 2004 Master's thesis, and the term was later formalized in the 2010 Open Design Manifesto.

The COVID-19 pandemic provided a significant test case for the open-design movement's principles of distributed manufacturing. With global supply chains struggling to meet the demand for personal protective equipment (PPE) and medical devices, open design communities, such as Open Source Medical Supplies (OSCMS), contributed to fill the gap. It was documented that OSCMS producted over 48 million units of PPE and medical supplies by "citizen responders" and makerspaces across 86 countries.

== Current directions ==
Open Source Ecology, open source farming and industrial machinery

The open-design movement currently unites two trends. On one hand, people apply their skills and time on projects for the common good, perhaps where funding or commercial interest is lacking, for developing countries or to help spread ecological or cheaper technologies. On the other hand, open design may provide a framework for developing advanced projects and technologies that might be beyond the resource of any single company or country and involve people who, without the copyleft mechanism, might not collaborate otherwise. There is now also a third trend, where these two methods come together to use high-tech open-source (e.g. 3D printing) but customized local solutions for sustainable development. Open Design holds great potential in driving future innovation as recent research has proven that stakeholder users working together produce more innovative designs than designers consulting users through more traditional means. The open-design movement may arguably organize production by prioritising socio-ecological well-being over corporate profits, over-production and excess consumption.

== Open machine design as compared to open-source software ==
The open-design movement is currently fairly nascent but holds potential for the future. In some respects, design and engineering are more suited to open collaborative development than the increasingly common open-source software projects, because with 3D models and photographs the concept can often be understood visually. It is not necessary that the project members speak even the same languages to usefully collaborate.

However, there are certain barriers to overcome for open design when compared to software development where there are mature and widely used tools available and the duplication and distribution of code cost next to nothing. Creating, testing and modifying physical designs is not quite so straightforward because of the effort, time and cost required to create the physical artefact; although with access to emerging flexible computer-controlled manufacturing techniques the complexity and effort of construction can be significantly reduced (see tools mentioned in the fab lab article).

== Organizations ==
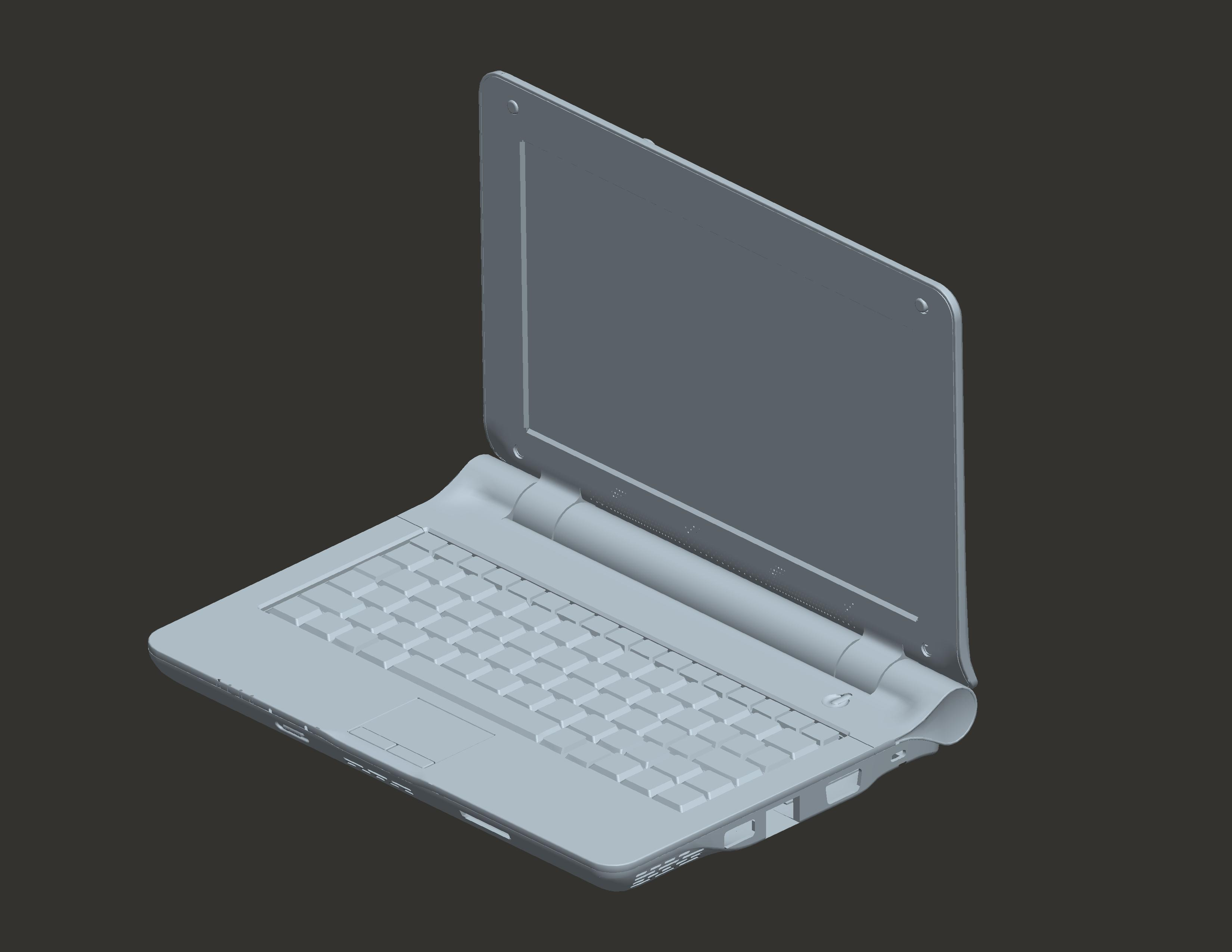
VIA OpenBook reference design CAD visualisation

Open design was considered in 2012 a fledgling movement consisting of several unrelated or loosely related initiatives. Many of these organizations are single, funded projects, while a few organizations are focusing on an area needing development. In some cases (e.g. Thingiverse for 3D printable designs or Appropedia for open source appropriate technology) organizations are making an effort to create a centralized open source design repository as this enables innovation. Notable organizations include:

- AguaClara, an open-source engineering group at Cornell University publishing a design tool and CAD designs for water treatment plants
- Arduino, an open-source electronics hardware platform, community and company
- Elektor
- Field Ready
- GrabCAD
- Instructables
- Local Motors (defunct): methods of transport, vehicles
- LittleBits
- One Laptop Per Child (inactive), a project to provide children in developing territories laptop computers with open hardware and software
- OpenCores, digital electronic hardware
- Open Architecture Network
- Open Hardware and Design Alliance (OHANDA)
- OpenStructures (OSP), a modular construction model where everyone designs on the basis of one shared geometrical grid.
- Open Source Ecology, including solar cells
- Thingiverse, miscellaneous
- VOICED
- VIA OpenBook netbook has CAD files for the design licensed under the Creative Commons Attribution Share Alike 3.0 Unported License
- Wikispeed, open-source modular vehicles
- Open Source Design, a community created in 2016 to hold space for designers interested in open source.
- Zoetrope, an open design low-cost wind turbine.

== See also ==
- 3D printing services
- Cosmopolitan localism
- Commons-based peer production
- Co-creation
- Knowledge commons
- Modular design
- OpenBTS
- Open manufacturing
- Open-source appropriate technology
- Open-source architecture
- Open Source Initiative
- Open-source software
- Open standard and Open standardization
- Open Design Alliance
- Digital public goods
