= Wikispeed =

Automotive manufacturer that produces modular design cars

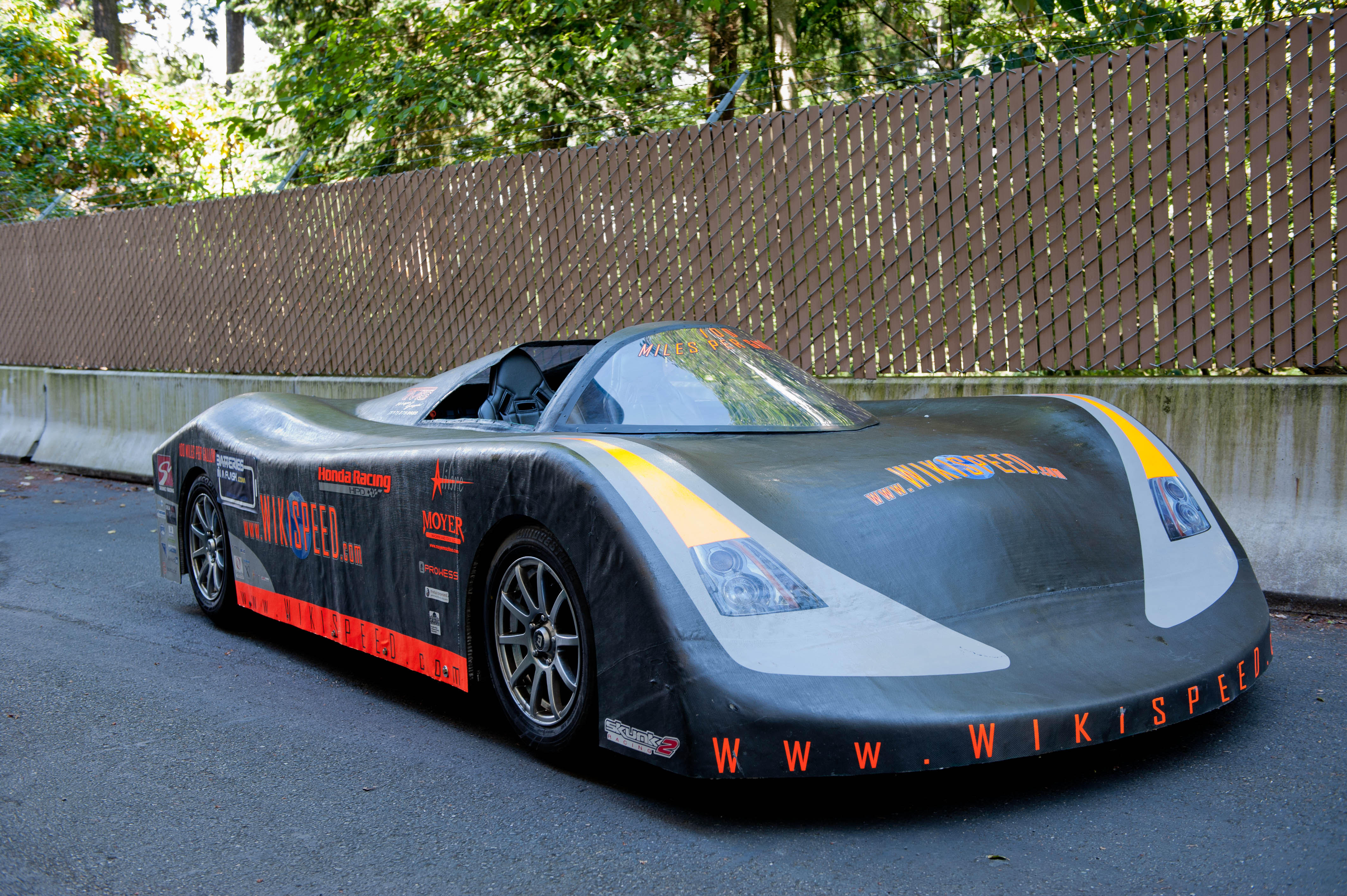
Wikispeed car (2021)

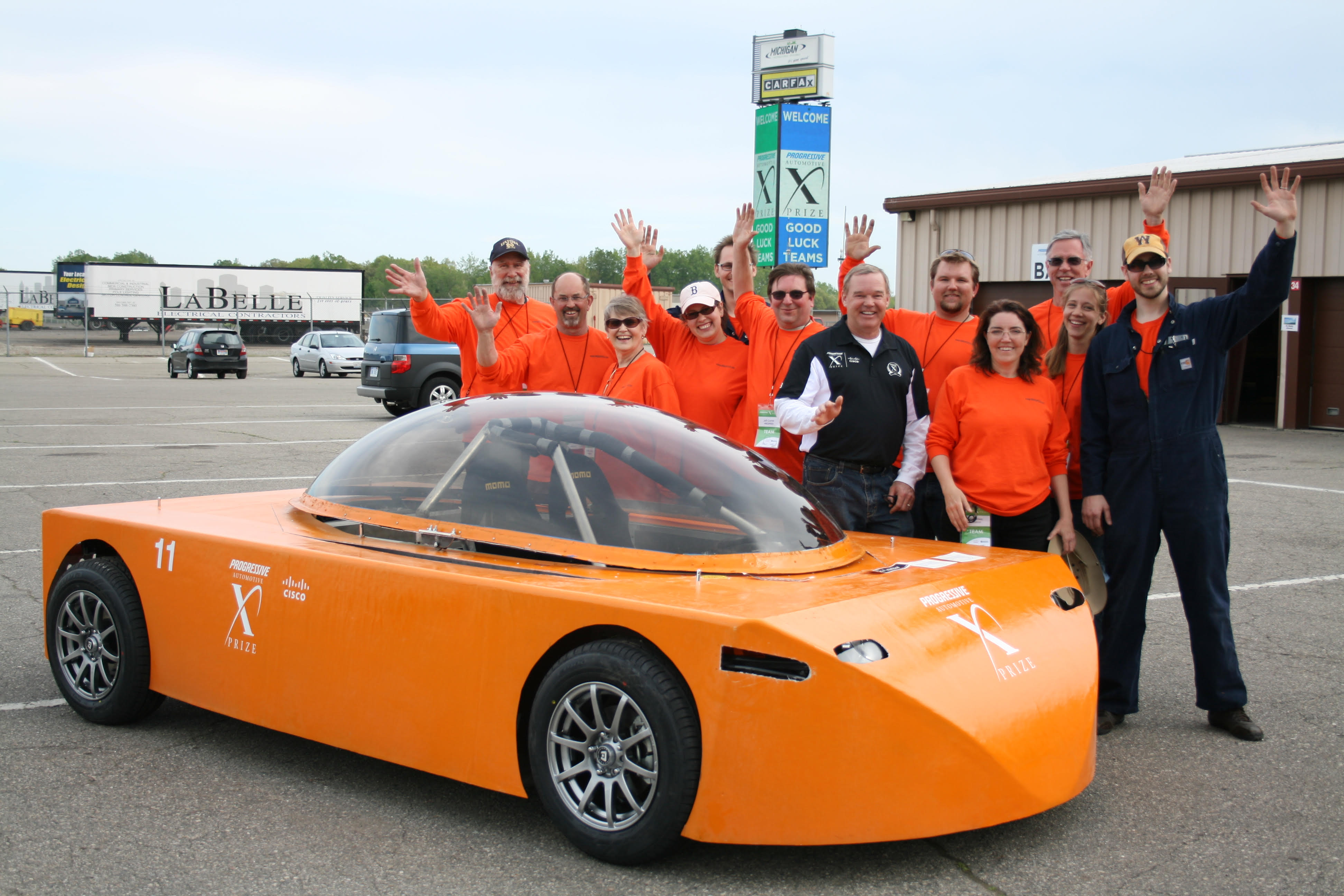
Wikispeed car (2021)

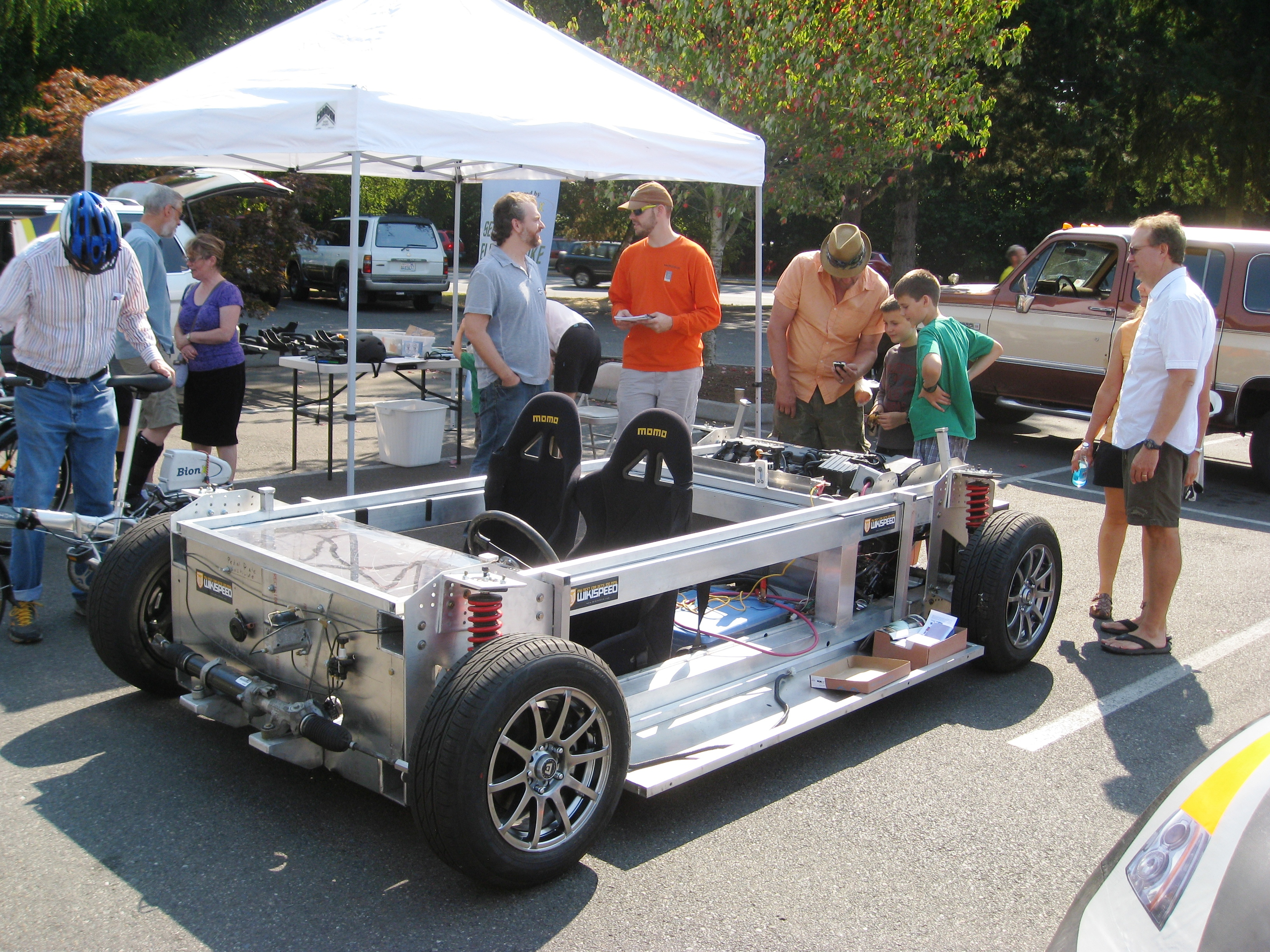
Prototype in 2011

Wikispeed is an automotive startup with a modular design car. Wikispeed competed in the Progressive Automotive X Prize competition in 2010 and won the tenth place in the mainstream class, which had a hundred other cars competing, often from big companies and universities. The car debuted at the North American International Auto Show (NAIAS) in Detroit, Michigan in January 2011.

Wikispeed was founded by Joe Justice and is headquartered in Seattle, Washington. In 2011, Justice gave a TEDx talk explaining the management style implemented by the Wikispeed team.

In May 2012, Joe Justice launched an Indiegogo campaign to crowdfund further refinement of their prototype design into a market-ready kit car. Justice did not seek development funding from "traditional venture capital" in an effort to avoid forcing the Wikispeed project "into commercial short-term money-making". The campaign sought roughly $50,000 over a period of two months. The campaign failed.

Wikispeed aims to apply scrum development techniques borrowed from the software development industry. They use open source tools and lean management methods to improve their productivity.

On January 6, 2015, Wikispeed announced that they have been unable to create a working engine module since their second model and called on the community for help. On February 15, 2015, Wikispeed announced an update that they have produced another working engine module.

== See also ==
- Open-source car
- Electric vehicle
- Open hardware
