= HP Performance Optimized Datacenter =

Portable data centre

HP Performance Optimized Datacenter (POD) 240a, 40c, 20c
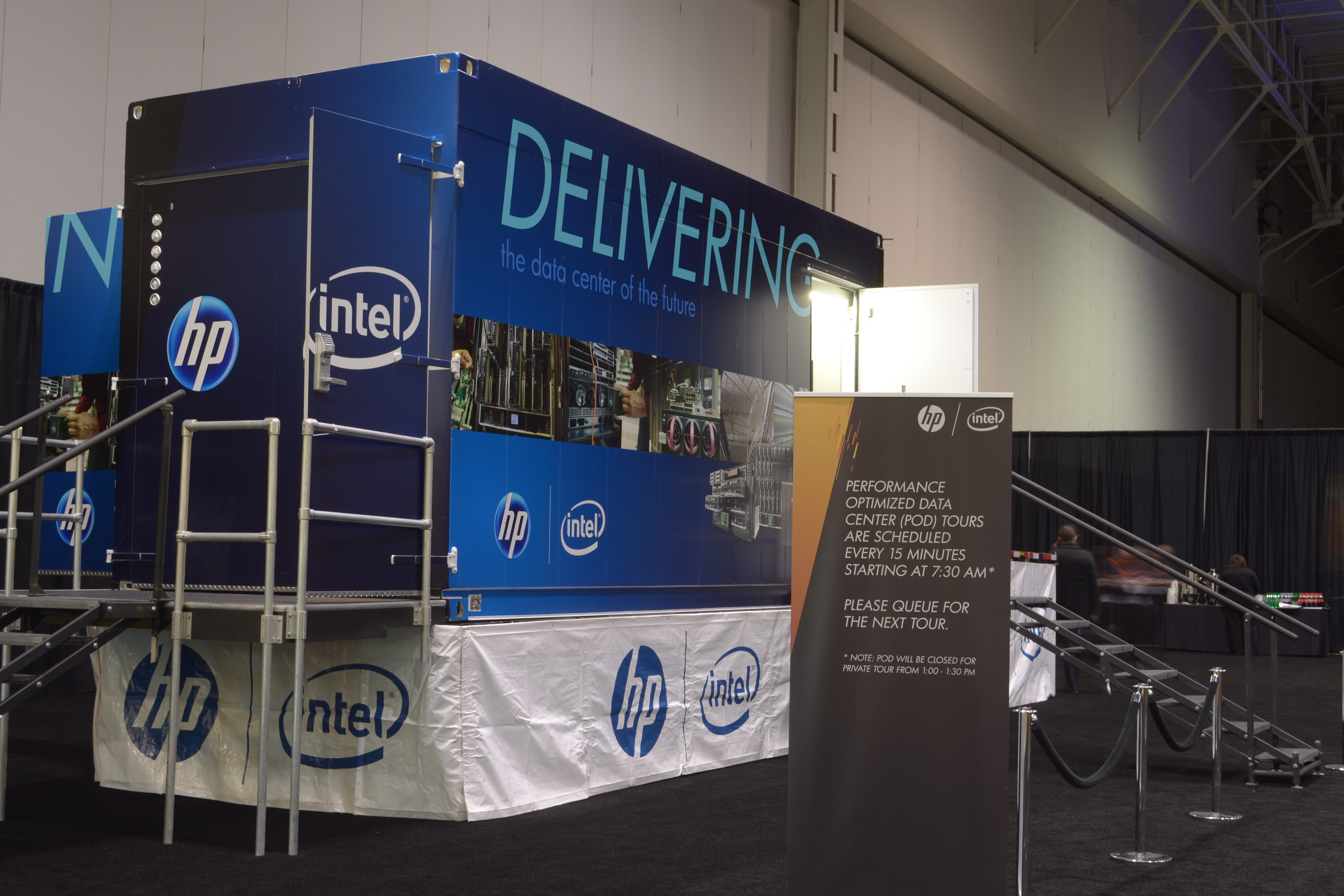
- Developer: Hewlett-Packard (HP)
- Released: HP POD 40c launched in 2008; HP POD 20c launched in 2010; HP 240a launched in 2011
- Dimensions: HP POD 40c uses 40-foot modules; HP POD 20c uses 20-foot modules; HP 240a uses multiple 40-foot modules
- Website: HP Performance Optimized Data Center page

- Additional specifications
| Compute capacity | Can support over 7,000 compute nodes or 24,000 large-form-factor (LFF) hard drives, up to 1.3 megawatts up to 30 kW per rack |
| Power Usage Effectiveness (PUE) rating | POD 20c and 40c: 1.25; POD 240a: 1.05 to 1.4, depending on IT load and location |
| Cooling method | POD 20c and 40c: water cooled; POD 240a: HP Adaptive Cooling Technology (air cooled) |

The HP Performance Optimized Datacenter (POD) is a range of three modular data centers manufactured by HP.

Housed in purpose-built modules of standard shipping container form-factor of either 20 feet or 40 feet in length the data centers are shipped preconfigured with racks, cabling and equipment for power and cooling. They can support technologies from HP or third parties. The claimed capacity is the equivalent of up to 10,000 square feet of typical data center capacity depending on the model. Depending on the model, they use either chilled water cooling or a combination of direct expansion air cooling.

== HP POD 20c and 40c ==
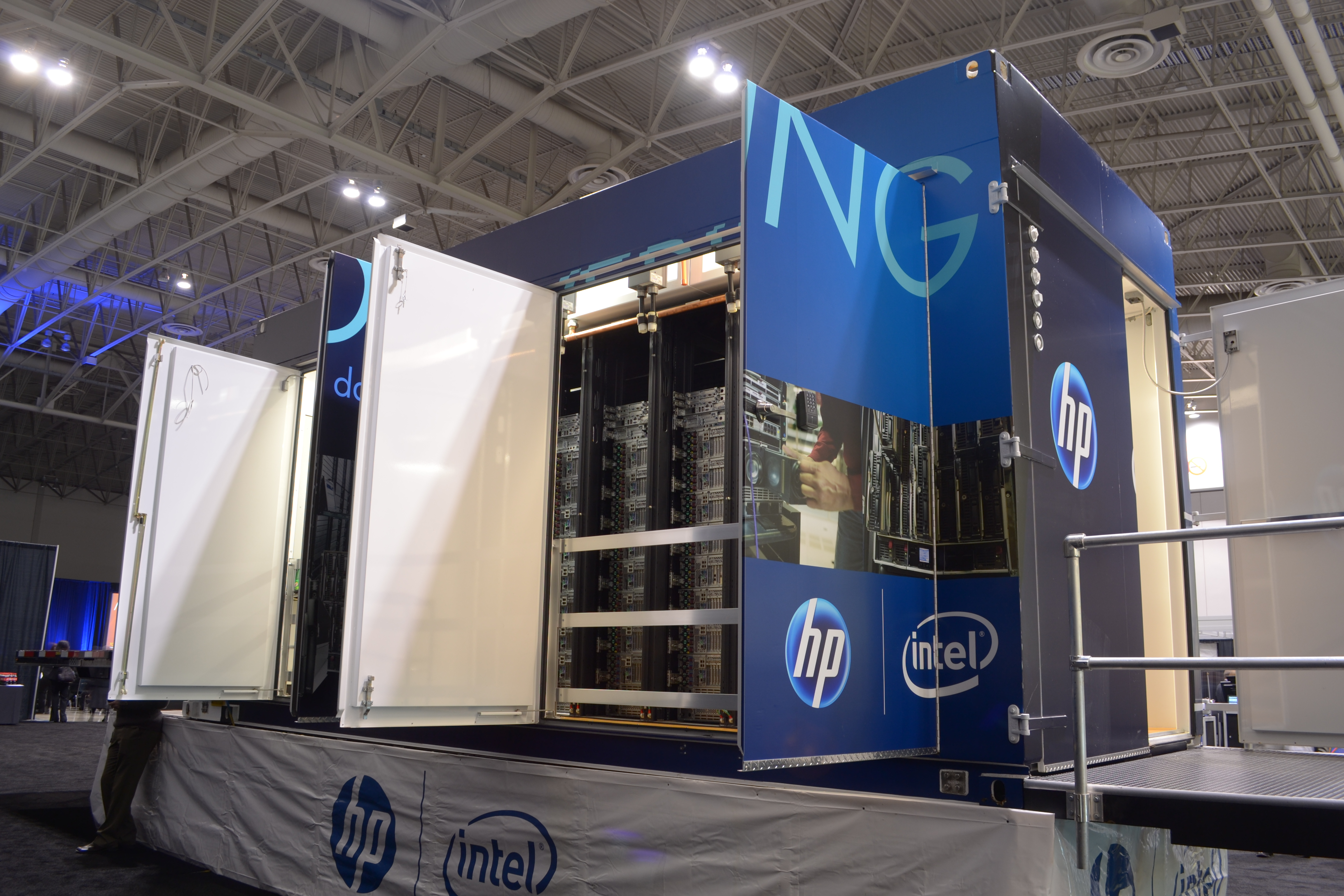
A 40-foot HP POD.

The POD 40c was launched in 2008. This 40-foot modular data center has a maximum power capacity up to 27 kW per rack. The POD 40c supports 3,500 compute nodes or 12,000 LFF hard drives. HP has claimed this offers the computing equivalent of 4,000 square foot of traditional data center space.

The POD 20c was launched in 2010. This modular data center is housed in a 20-foot container. This version houses 10 industry-standard 50U racks of hardware. The POD uses an efficient cooling design of variable speed fans, hot and cold aisle containment and close coupled cooling to maximize capacity and efficiency. The POD 20c can operate at a Power Usage Effectiveness of 1.25. PODs can maintain cold aisle temperatures higher than typical brick and mortar data centers. The temperature of the cold aisle in traditional data centers is typically 68 to 72 degrees, whereas the POD can efficiently operate at temperatures in this range up to 90 degrees.

Both the 20c and the 40c are water-cooled. The benefit of water cooling is higher capacity and less power usage than traditional air-cooled systems.

== HP POD 240a ==
The HP POD 240a was launched in June 2011. It can be configured with two rows of 44 extra height 50U racks that could house 4,400 server nodes of typical size, or 7,040 server nodes of the densest size. HP claimed that the typical brick and mortar data center required to house this equipment would be 10,000 square feet of floor space.

HP claims "near-perfect" Energy efficiency for the POD 240a, which it nicknames the "EcoPOD". HP says it has recorded estimated Power Usage Effectiveness (PUE) ratios of 1.05 to 1.4, depending on IT load and location. The perfect efficiency would be a Power usage effectiveness (PUE) of 1.0.

The POD 240a has a refrigerant-based air cooled HVAC system with air-side economization When the ambient air conditions are cool enough, the 240a uses economizer or free air mode—where outside air can be taken in and circulated inside the modular data center to cool the IT equipment.

== Customers ==
In September 2013, eBay announced that they were "deploying the world’s largest modular data center, with 44 rack positions and 1.4Megawatts of power" using HP EcoPODs.

== See also ==
- HP Flexible Data Center
- IBM Portable Modular Data Center
- Sun Modular Data Center
