= HP Flexible Data Center =

Modular data centre

HP Flexible Data Center, also termed FlexDC, is a modular data center built from prefabricated components by Hewlett-Packard and introduced in 2010. It is housed in five large buildings that form the shape of a butterfly. The Flexible DC looks like a traditional building, but it is fabricated off-site in order to circumvent the two years it often takes for traditional building construction. The building consists of a central admin area (the Core), surrounded by 1-4 data halls (the Quadrants). FDC offers cooling options that are optimal for each type of climate.

The FlexDC product line follows from HP's acquisition of EYP Mission Critical Facilities in November 2007. HP currently positions FlexDC at the top end of their modular datacenter product line (above their PODs, which are housed in shipping containers), up to 3.6MW in capacity per facility.
