= Wireless data center =

A Wireless Data center is a type of data center that uses wireless communication technology instead of cables to store, process and retrieve data for enterprises. The development of Wireless Data centers arose as a solution to growing cabling complexity and hotspots. The wireless technology was introduced by Shin et al., who replaced all cables with 60 GHz wireless connections at the Cayley data center.

== Motivation ==
Most DCs deployed today can be classified as wired DCs because they use copper and optical fiber cables to handle intra- and inter-rack connections in the network. This approach has two problems, cable complexity and hotspots. Hotspots, also known as hot servers, are servers that generate high traffic compared to others in the network and they might become bottlenecks of the system. To address these problems several researchers propose the use of wireless communication into data center networks, to either augment existing wired data centers, or to realize a pure wireless data center

Although cable complexity at first seems like an esthetical problem, it can affect a DC in different ways. First, a significant manual effort is necessary to install and manage these cables. Apart from that, cables can additionally affect data center cooling. Finally, cables take up space, which could be used to add more servers. The use of wireless technologies could reduce the cable complexity and avoid the problems cited before, moreover, it would allow for automatic configurable link establishment between nodes with minimum effort.

Wireless links can be rearranged dynamically which makes it possible to perform adaptive topology adjustment. This means that the network can be rearranged to fulfil the real-time traffic demands of hotspots, thus solving the hot servers problem. Additionally, wireless connections do not rely on switches and therefore are free of problems such as single-point of failure and limited bisection bandwidth.

== Requirements ==
The Data Center Network (DCN) is the infrastructure responsible to provide intra and inter-DC networking services, therefore is essential to design efficient high-speed/high bandwidth DCN to satisfy the high computing and communication demands from the DC. Other basic requirements, such as scalability and fault tolerance should also be addressed. In 2008, Ramachandran et al. talk specifically about the requirements that a wireless DCN should meet, they are as follows:

1. High inter-node link capacity: Online services, such as MapReduce and distributed file systems, need high link and network capacity.
2. Reliability: There should be predictable performance of links over time.
3. Security Isolation: Data exchanged between services should be protected from unintended services for security and confidentiality.
4. Scalability: Link connectivity should scale and allow for the incremental addition of new machines to the network.
5. Small form factor of networking components: All machine components should have small form factors to allow for reduced energy consumption and to meet higher processing requirements and floor space constraints.

== Technologies ==
There are two candidate technologies to enable wireless DCNs, the most cited one is 60GHz radio frequency (RF), the other option is free space optical (FSO).

- 60 GHz RF: Radios in the license-free 60 GHz range have several characteristics that make them more suitable for adoption in data-centers. The spectrum availability of 7 GHz enables the creation of multiple links of high speed per unit volume, which allows for increased scalability. Moreover, signals at this frequency have reduced range relative to signals at lower frequencies, and smaller wavelengths, this allows for an improved interference mitigation and security, and also provides the capacity of designing sophisticated interfaces with small form factor. Finally, since the band between 57–64 GHz is license-free in a large number of countries, it is possible to launch products worldwide.
- FSO: An FSO link is composed of a light source at the transmitter and a photodetector (PD) at the receiver. Light Emitting Diodes (LEDs) and Laser Diodes (LDs) are the most commonly used light sources in FSO links. LDs can support high data rate transmission, on the other hand, LEDs are considered as extended sources that can operate safely but have lower data rates as compared to LDs. Moreover, LEDs are cheaper and more reliable when compared to LDs. Positive-intrinsic-negative (PIN) or avalanche photodetectors (APDs) are the most common photodetectors used on FSOs. PINs are used in many contexts that require FSO links of low cost and low data rates, on the other hand, APDs are used on systems that require high data rates and high performance.

== Challenges ==
Since DCNs needs high bandwidth in order to exchange big amount of data, new communication technologies must be capable of achieving high link and network capacities and also it should meet other requirements of a data center network. Hence, In order to implement wireless communication technologies in data centers, there are several challenges that may face any wireless technology to be deployed in DCNs like:

1. Security: In a DCN, there is a massive amount of data to exchange between the nodes in the racks, therefore isolation of data from unintended nodes and services is a must to avoid security and privacy problems.
2. Small form factor of networking components: The physical dimensions of racks are defined, also the thickness of a module in a rack is measured in Rack Unit (U), which is 1.8 ′′, most servers fit 1U but the others fit 2U or larger. The designers need to develop the network components and interfaces which meet these constraints.
3. Heat and air flow: Any changes in the DCN floor (e.g. rack arrangement, physical topology, etc.) can cause changes in Data center environmental control, e.g. air flow and heat distribution properties. This may, in turn, lead to inefficient cooling, and thus network component failure or higher power consumption.
4. Agile Links: To address the hotspot problem encountered by wired DCNs, inter-rack wireless links must have a degree of reconfigurability. One of the main challenges faced by wireless DCN designers is establishing and maintaining wireless links between different servers or racks.
5. Obstruction-free wireless links: In the large-scale data centers there is too many interconnectivity between the racks, therefore the proposed wireless communication technology to use in DCNs must be able to meet this large link connectivity in DCNs. However, a critical impediment to the design of wireless DCN is the difficulty establishing obstruction-free wireless links to connect multiple adjacent network components. This is because LOS links cannot be easily maintained as other components get in between the source and destination need to be connected leading to risk of link blocking.
6. Containerised DCNs: Many existing and under development DCs utilise large open DCN floor design. However, containerised DCNs can present a cheaper and an efficient alternative design. A few papers discuss the deployment of 60 GHz RF and FSO technologies in the containerised DCN (also known as Modular data center) scenario. As a container becomes the building block of a DCN, intra and inter-container communication links must be designed. At the scale of the container, the cabling complexity problems may not be considerable, also by replacing the wired with wireless technologies, there will be few more space to locate more servers. The other technical issues are Confined space and metal walls that make the container a challenging environment for 60 GHz links as signals may reflect off the walls leading to multi-path fading.

== Proposed designs ==
=== Cayley DCN ===
==== Architecture ====
In the concept of wireless data centers, efficient use of open spaces is significant in order to optimize resource multiplexing. Since the maximum number of live connections proportional to the volume of data center per single antenna beam. Cayley DCN proposes to use cylindrical racks that are contains levels called stories and each row contains pie-shaped containers. (Fig. 1). These containers stores servers in it and servers faces both inner rack space and inter-rack space. Each server has two transceivers positioned at opposite ends of it. One for intra-rack communication and another one for inter-rack communication. Network Interface Cards (NIC) that are used in traditional data centers are replaced by a custom-built Y-switch with transceivers to connect the server's system bus. In this way, classic network switching fabric that exists in traditional databases are eliminated, which means, there is no need classic networking switches in the novel topology since every server is able to route data. This communication is maintained by geographical routing protocol which tries to find the shortest path between source and destination using coordinates of racks, the ordinal number of stories and the index number of the server in the stories. A server uses three routing tables to determine next hop which are inter-rack routing table, inter-story routing table, intra-story routing table.

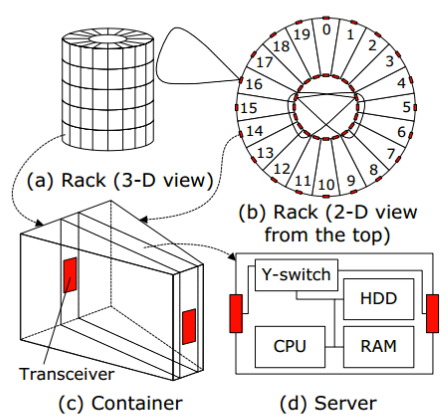
Fig. 1: Cayley wireless Data Center

==== Cost and Performance ====
The technical studies have been done to evaluate network performance, failure resilience and cost. During the tests, since the wireless transceivers and Y-switches are not yet available in the market, estimations have done based on the expected price range of 60 GHz transceivers and simulations are developed for performance evaluations of Cayley data center and Conventional data centers (CDC) with different designs.

Based on conducted experiences with Cayley data center and CDC that are configured with different oversubscription rates, Cayley data centers have better performance at maximum aggregate bandwidth compared to CDC. Cayley data centers are taking advantage of less switching design and doubles CDC's bandwidth during packet delivery outside of a rack.

Cayley data center has a drawback in packet delivery latency and scalability because it uses multi-hop routing and uses intermediate nodes to convey packets to other nodes. Therefore, as the traffic load increases, the maximum latency quickly increases as well. Hence, Cayley data centers are not able to reach the same scalability level of CDC's, since CDC has stable wired links and network hops with smaller numbers

Cayley data centers are more resilient to failures compared to conventional data centers since Cayley topology has dense connectivity and have minimized the number of switches that are a critical point for failures for data centers. Experiences shows that server nodes will be fully connected until 20% of nodes, 59% stories, and 14% racks fail. However, more than 99% of connections are preserved to %55 nodes and stories, 45% of racks are failed

Cost analysis of Cayley data centers has been done based on assumptions since 60 GHz transceivers are not commercially in the market yet. However, it is expected that transceivers’ price will not be expensive if the silicon chips are used. In the case, the cost of a 60-GHz transceiver less than $90, Cayley data centers will be much cheaper. A 60 GHz transceiver consumes maximum 0.3 watts, while the top of rack switches (TOR), aggregation switches (AS), and core switches (CS) consume in the range of 170-620 watts. Therefore, total power switch packet consumption of CDC is at least 12 times more than Cayley data centers. Moreover, due to the absence of cabling, maintenance costs will be significantly lower
