= Shipping container architecture =

Buildings constructed using modules, like shipping containers

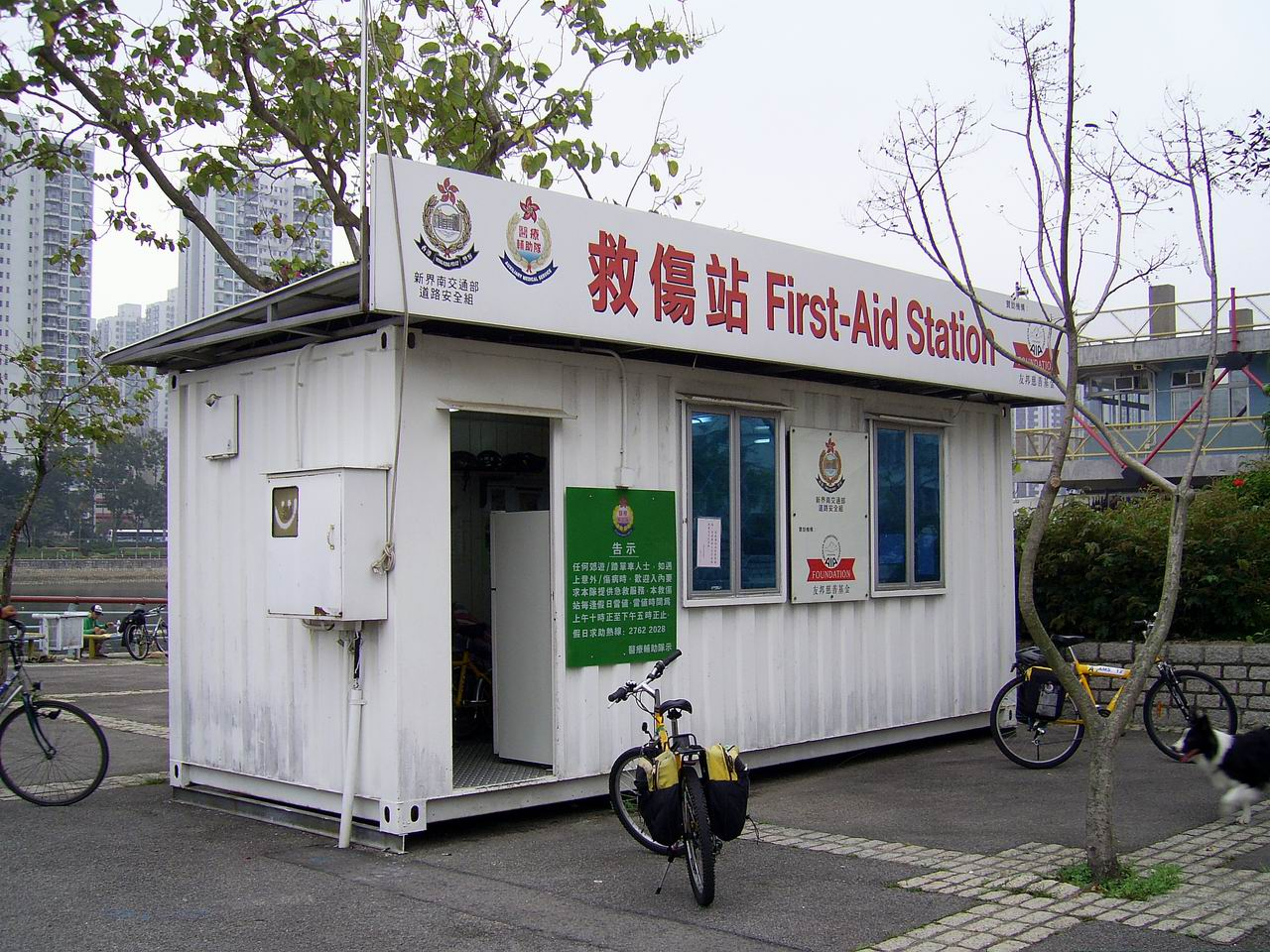
A first aid station built using an intermodal container

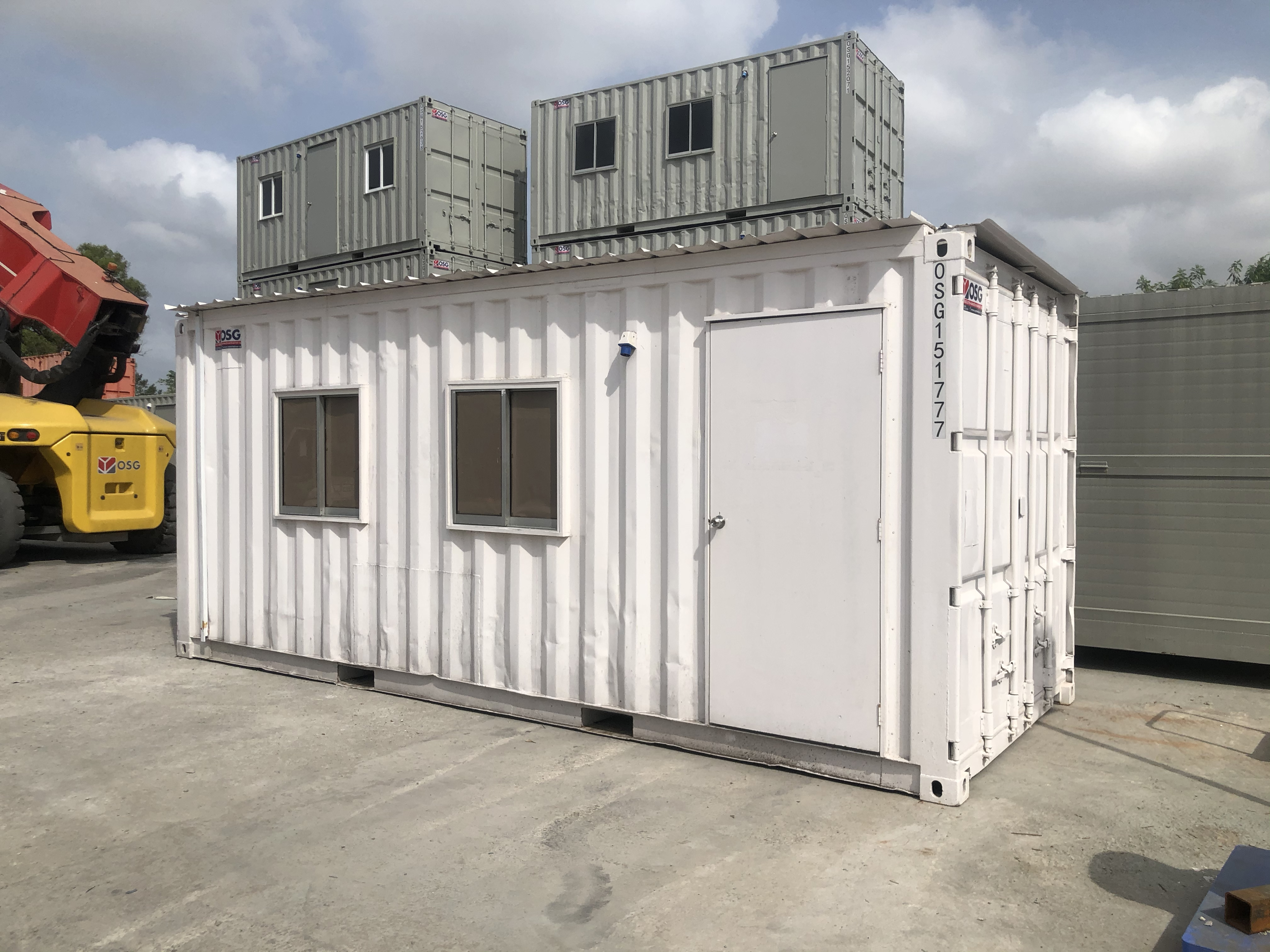
A remote office constructed with a used shipping container.

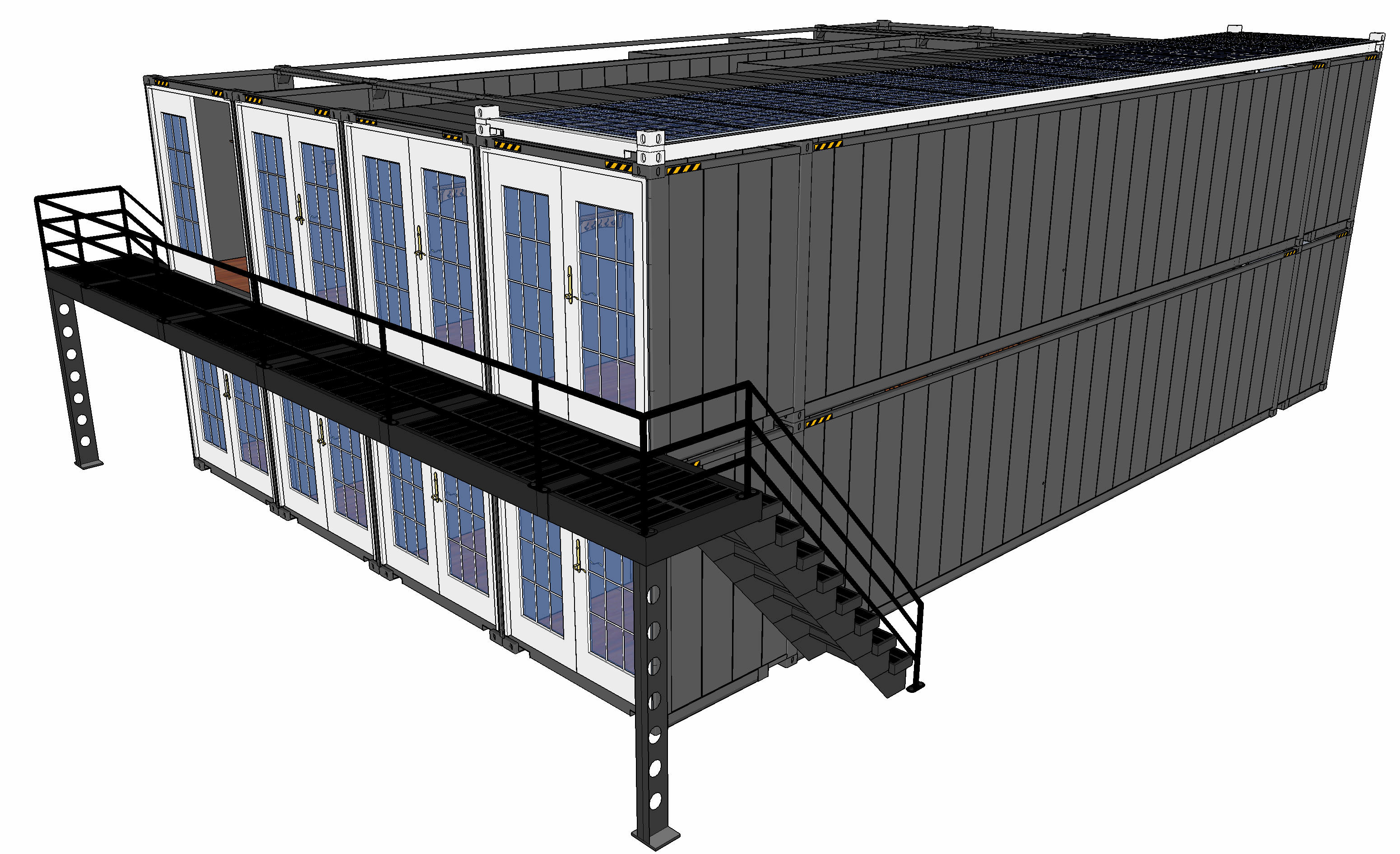
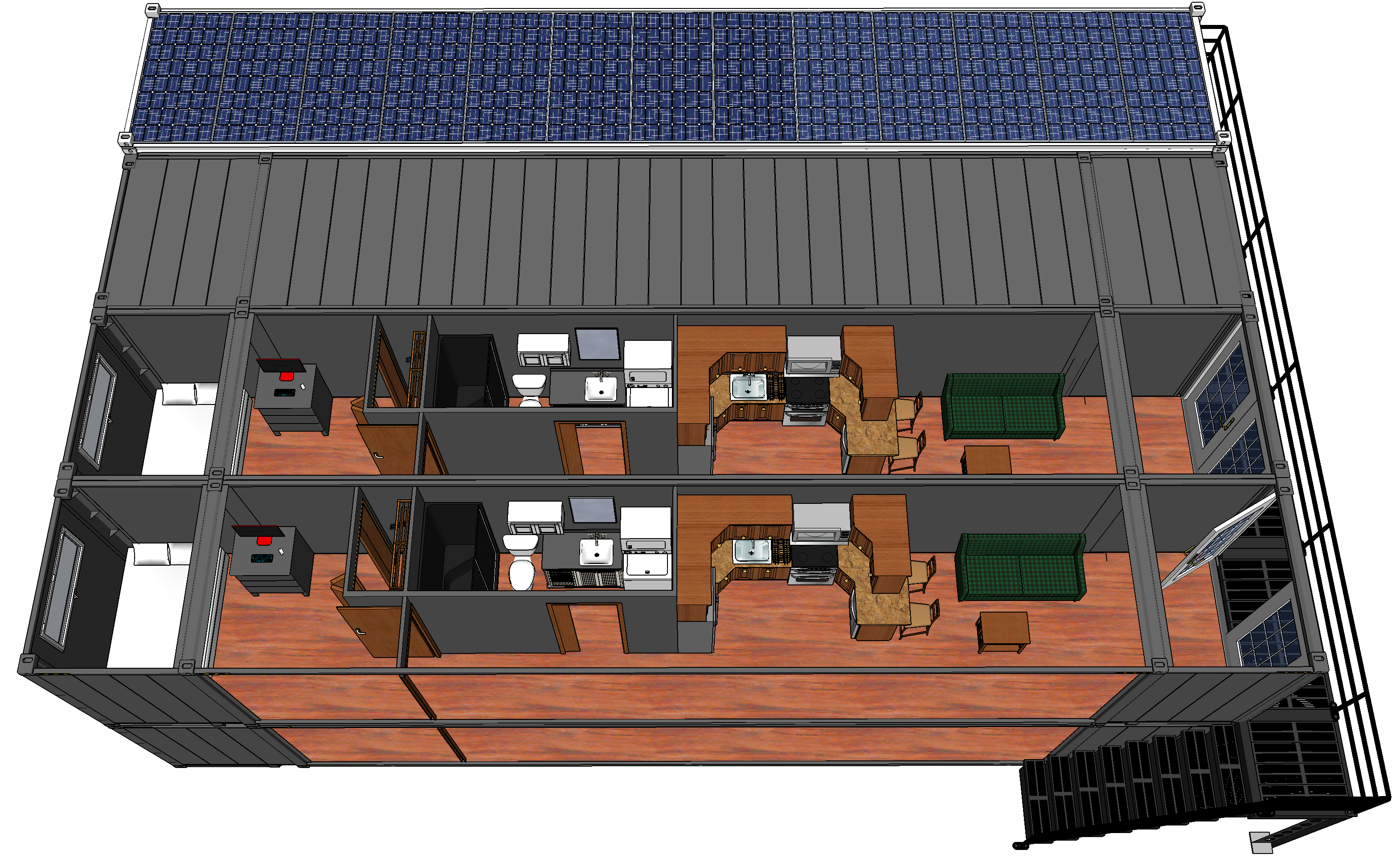
Stacked reefer container homes

Shipping container architecture is a form of architecture that uses steel intermodal containers (shipping containers) as the main structural element. It is also referred to as cargotecture or arkitainer, portmanteau words formed from "cargo" and "architecture". This form of architecture is often associated with the tiny-house movement as well as the sustainable living movement.

The use of containers as building materials has been growing in popularity due to their strength, wide availability, low cost, and eco-friendliness.

Shipping container architecture often requires specialized design plans to ensure compliance with building codes such as the International Residential Code (IRC) and International Building Code (IBC), which govern structural modifications, insulation standards, and safety requirements. Professionally engineered, permit-ready container home plans can greatly facilitate the approval and construction processes by providing detailed layouts and specifications aligned with these codes.

== Advantages ==
Due to their shape and material, shipping containers have the ability to be customized in many different ways and can be modified to fit various purposes. Standardized dimensions and various interlocking mechanisms make these containers modular, allowing them to be easily combined into larger structures that follow modular design. This also simplifies any extensions to the structure as new containers can easily be added on to create larger structures. When empty, shipping containers can be stacked up to 12 units high.

Because shipping containers are designed to be stacked in high columns and to carry heavy loads, they are also strong and durable. They are designed to resist harsh environments, such as those on ocean-going vessels. Shipping containers conform to standard shipping sizes, which makes pre-fabricated modules easily transportable by ship, truck, or rail.

Shipping container construction is still less expensive than conventional construction, despite metal fabrication and welding being considered specialized labor (which usually increases construction costs). Unlike wood-frame construction, attachments must be welded or drilled to the outer skin, which is more time-consuming, and requires different job site equipment.

As a result of their widespread use, new and used shipping containers are available globally. This availability makes building tiny or container houses more affordable. Depending on the desired specifications and materials used, a container home will often cost less compared to a traditional house.

Shipping container construction requires fewer resources, meaning the quantity of traditional building materials needed (e.g. bricks and cement) are reduced. When upcycling shipping containers, thousands of kilograms of steel are saved. For example, a 12-metre-long (39 ft) shipping container weighs over 3,500 kilograms (7,700 lb).

== Disadvantages ==
Containers used for human occupancy in an environment with extreme temperature variations will normally have to be better insulated than most brick, block, or wood structures because steel conducts heat very well. Humidity can also affect steel structures, so when moist interior air condenses against the steel, it becomes humid and forms rust if the steel is not sealed and insulated.

While in service, containers may be damaged by friction, handling collisions, and the force of heavy loads overhead during ship transits. Additionally, although the two ends of a container are extremely strong, the roof is not. In the case of a 20-foot-long (6.1 m) container, the roof is built and tested only to withstand a 300 kg (660 lb) load, applied to an area of 61 cm by 30.5 cm (2 ft by 1 ft) in the weakest part of the roof. Companies inspect containers, and condemn them if they present cracked welds, twisted frames, or pin holes, among other faults.

Shipping containers possess the capacity to be organized into modular arrangements, thereby creating expansive structures. Nevertheless, deviating from the established standard dimensions, typically 20 feet (6.1 m) or 40 feet (12 m) in length, can engender inefficiencies in terms of both temporal and financial resources. Containers surpassing the 40 ft (12 m) length threshold may encounter challenges during navigation within residential vicinities.

The transportation and construction of shipping container structures can be expensive due to size and weight, and often require the use of cranes or forklifts. This is in contrast to more traditional construction materials like brick or lumber, which can be handled manually and used for construction even at elevated heights.

Obtaining building permits for shipping container homes can be troublesome in regions where municipalities are not familiar with shipping container architecture, because the use of steel for construction is usually for industrial rather than residential structures. In the United States, some shipping container homes have been built outside of various city zoning areas, where no building permits are required.

=== Chemicals ===
To meet Australian government shipping quarantine requirements, most container floors are treated with insecticides containing copper (23–25%), chromium (38–45%) and arsenic (30–37%) when manufactured. Chromium and arsenic are known carcinogens. If shipping containers are repurposed for human habitation, these floors should be safely removed, disposed, and replaced. Because shipping containers can carry a wide variety of industrial cargo, spillages or contamination may also occur inside the container, and will have to be cleaned before habitation. Before human habitation, ideally all internal surfaces should be abrasive blasted to bare metal, and re-painted with a non-toxic paint system. Solvents released from paint, and sealants used in manufacture, might also be harmful to human health.

== Examples ==
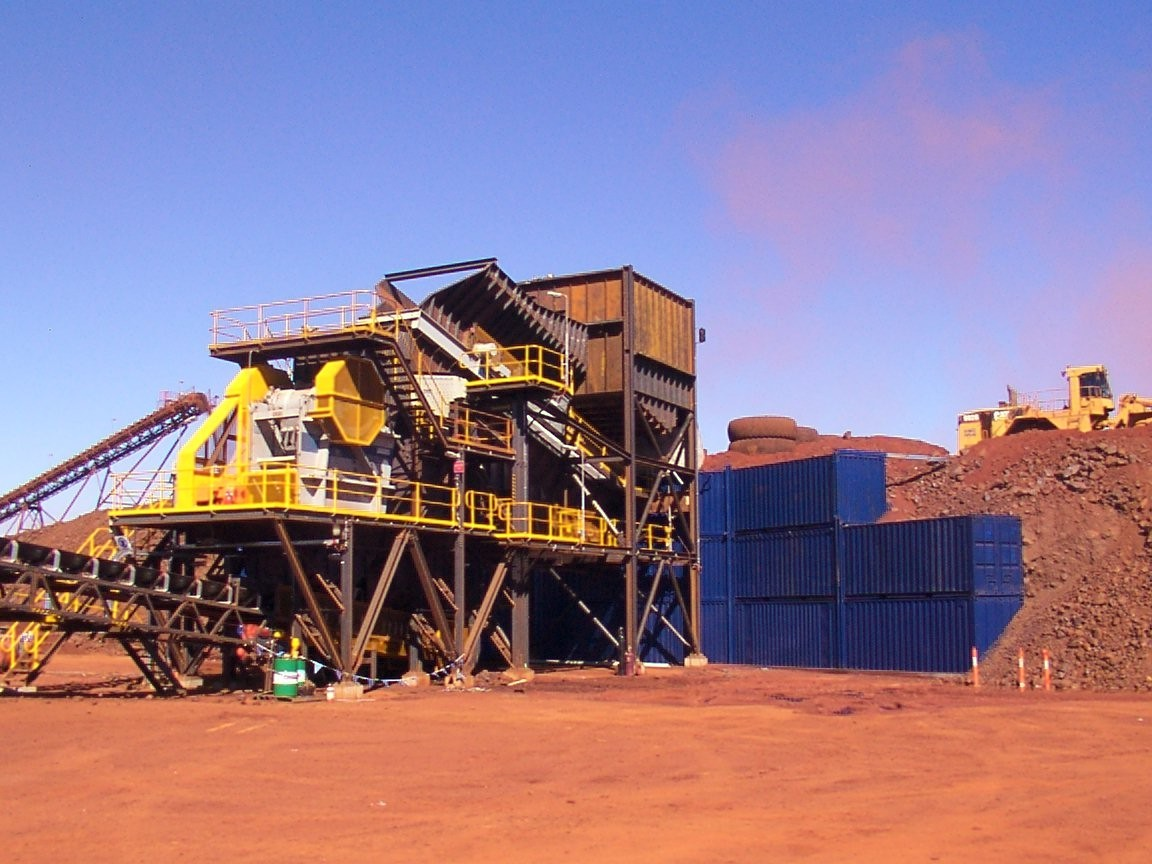
Shipping containers stacked to form a semi-permanent wall at an iron ore mine in Western Australia

The use, size, location and appearance of structures based on shipping containers vary widely.

When futurist Stewart Brand needed a place to assemble the material he would use to write How Buildings Learn, he converted a shipping container into an office space in the early 1990s. The conversion process is described in How Buildings Learn itself.

Illustration of the structure of Container City showing how the containers are stacked

In 2000, the firm Urban Space Management completed a project called Container City I in the Trinity Buoy Wharf area of London. The firm has gone on to complete additional container-based building projects, with more underway. In 2006, the Dutch company Tempohousing finished, in Amsterdam, the biggest container village in the world: 1,000 student homes from modified shipping containers from China.

In 2002, standard ISO shipping containers began to be modified for use as stand-alone on-site wastewater treatment plants. This use of containers creates a cost-effective, modular, and customizable solution to on-site wastewater treatment, eliminating the need for construction of a separate building to house the treatment system.

In 2006, Southern California Architect Peter DeMaria designed the first two-story shipping container home in the U.S., as an approved structural system under the strict guidelines of the nationally recognized Uniform Building Code (UBC). Named the Redondo Beach House, it inspired the creation of Logical Homes, a cargo container–based pre-fabricated home company. In 2007, Logical Homes created its flagship project, the Aegean, for the Computer Electronics Show in Las Vegas, Nevada.

In 2006, Village Underground constructed a series of not-for-profit artists' workspaces in Shoreditch, London. Developing the concept further, Auro Foxcroft constructed recycled shipping container architecture that incorporated retired London Underground carriages.

In 2007, entrepreneur Brian McCarthy developed prototypes of shipping container housing for maquiladora workers in Mexico.

=== Application in the live events and entertainment ===
In 2010, German architect and production designer Stefan Beese used six 12-metre-long (39 ft) shipping containers to create a large viewing deck and VIP lounge area for the Voodoo Music Experience, New Orleans, as a substitute for typical grand stand scaffolding. The containers double as storage space for other festival components throughout the year. The two top containers are cantilevered 2.7 metres (8.9 ft) on each side, creating two balconies that are prime viewing locations. Each container was perforated with cutouts spelling the word "VOODOO".

Grand Stand and VIP Lounge made from Shipping Containers for the 2009 and 2010 Voodoo Music Experiences, City Park, New Orleans.

In the United Kingdom, walls of containers filled with sand have been used as large sandbags to protect against flying debris from exploding ceramic insulators in electricity substations.

In October 2013, two barges owned by Google with superstructures made out of shipping containers received media attention amid speculation about their purpose.

=== Markets ===
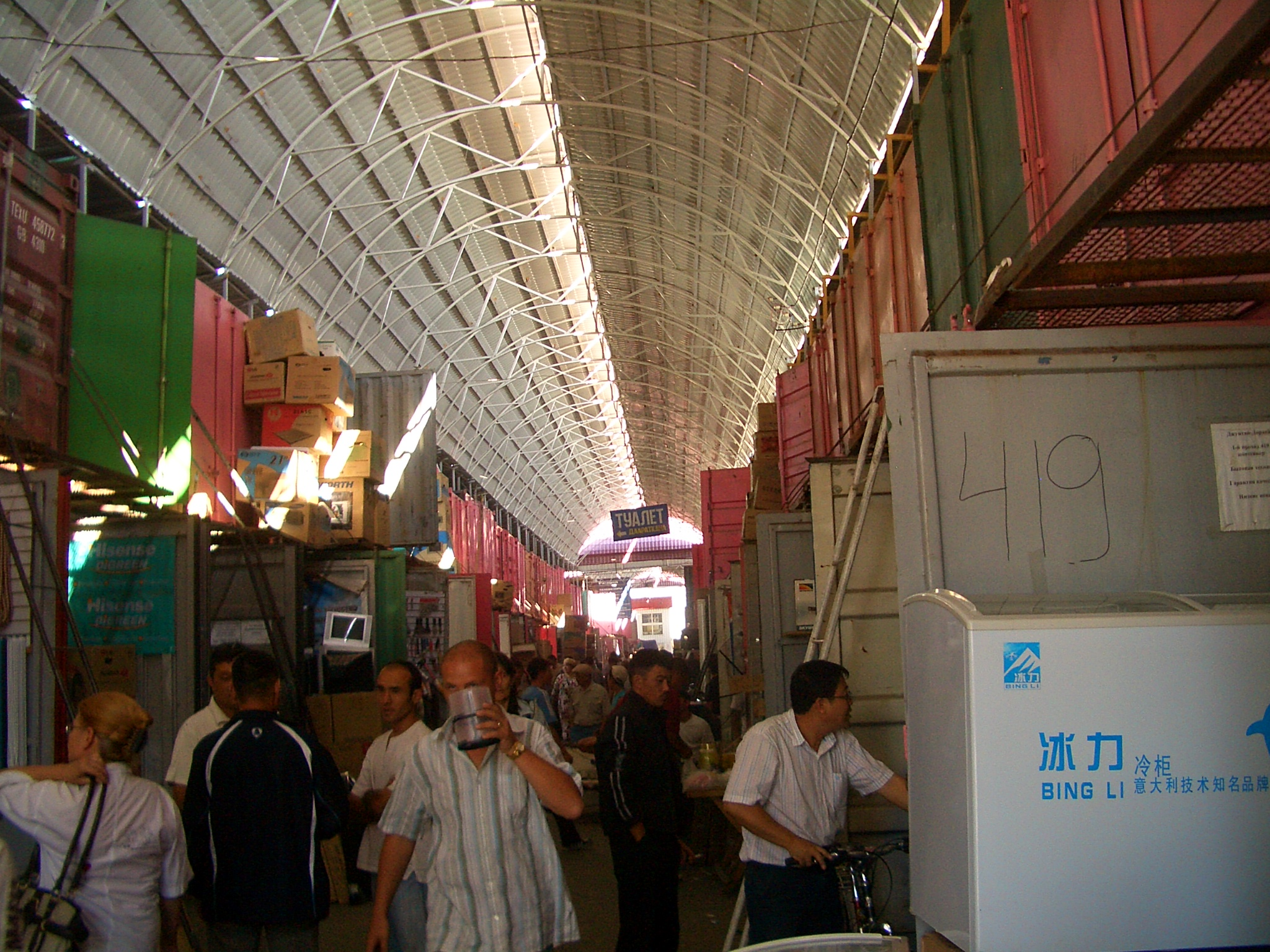
Brisk trade in Bishkek's Dordoy Bazaar

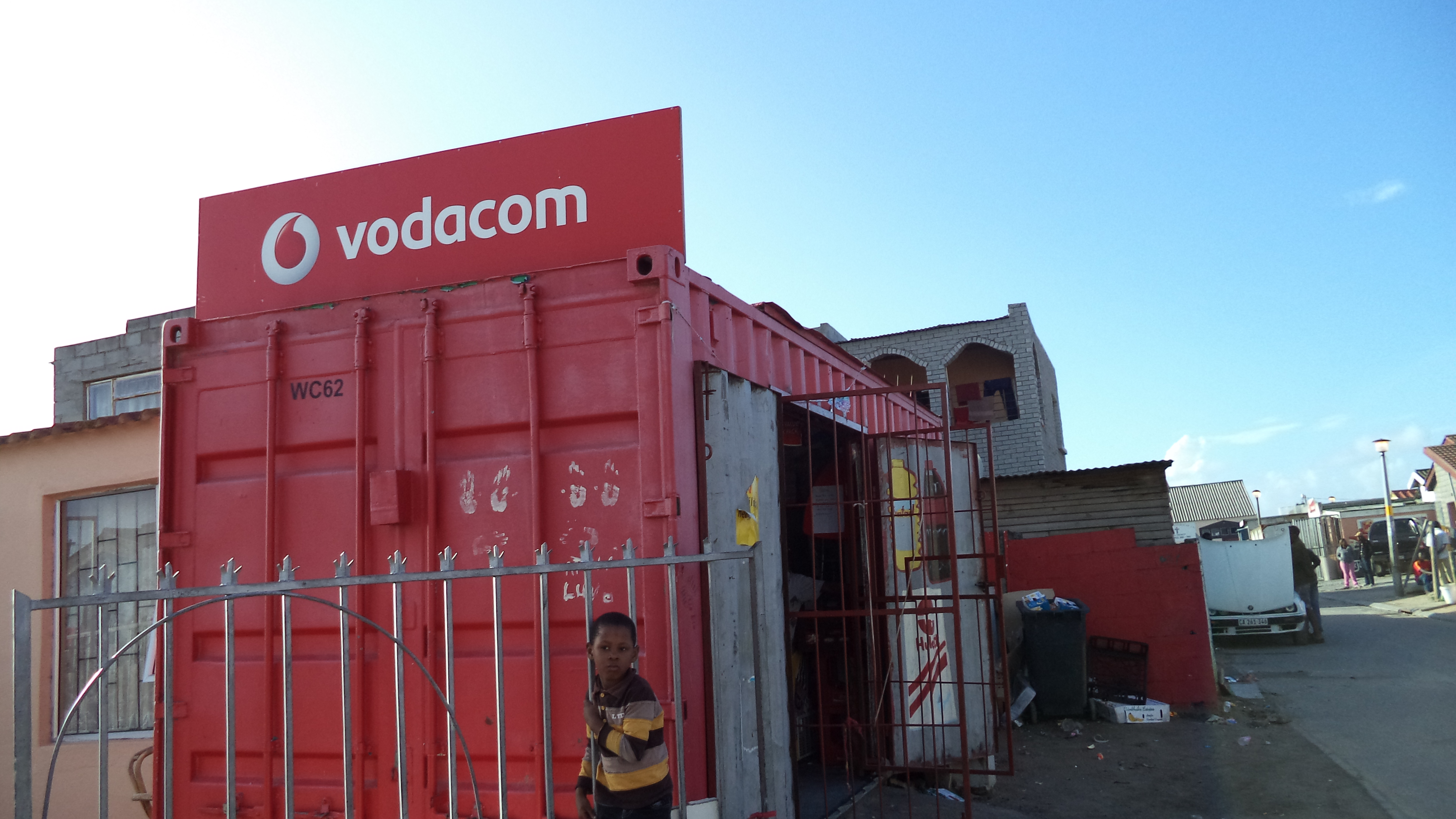
Shipping container store in Joe Slovo Park, Cape Town, South Africa.

Empty shipping containers are commonly used as market stalls and warehouses in the countries of the former USSR.

The biggest shopping mall or organized market in Europe is made up of alleys formed by stacked containers, on 69 hectares (170 acres) of land, between the airport and the central part of Odesa, Ukraine. Informally named "Tolchok", and officially known as the Seventh-Kilometer Market, it has 16,000 vendors and employs 1,200 security guards and maintenance workers.

In Central Asia, the Dordoy Bazaar in Bishkek, Kyrgyzstan is almost entirely composed of double-stacked containers. It is popular with travelers coming from Kazakhstan and Russia for the cheap prices and plethora of knock off designers.

In 2011, the Cashel Mall in Christchurch, New Zealand reopened in a series of shipping containers, months after it had been destroyed in the earthquake that devastated the city's central business district. Starbucks Coffee has also built a store using shipping containers. A pop-up shopping mall called Boxpark was also created in Shoreditch, London, in 2011, followed by other locations in the Greater London area. A pop-up shopping mall, Common Ground, was created in Seoul, South Korea in 2016.

=== Other uses ===
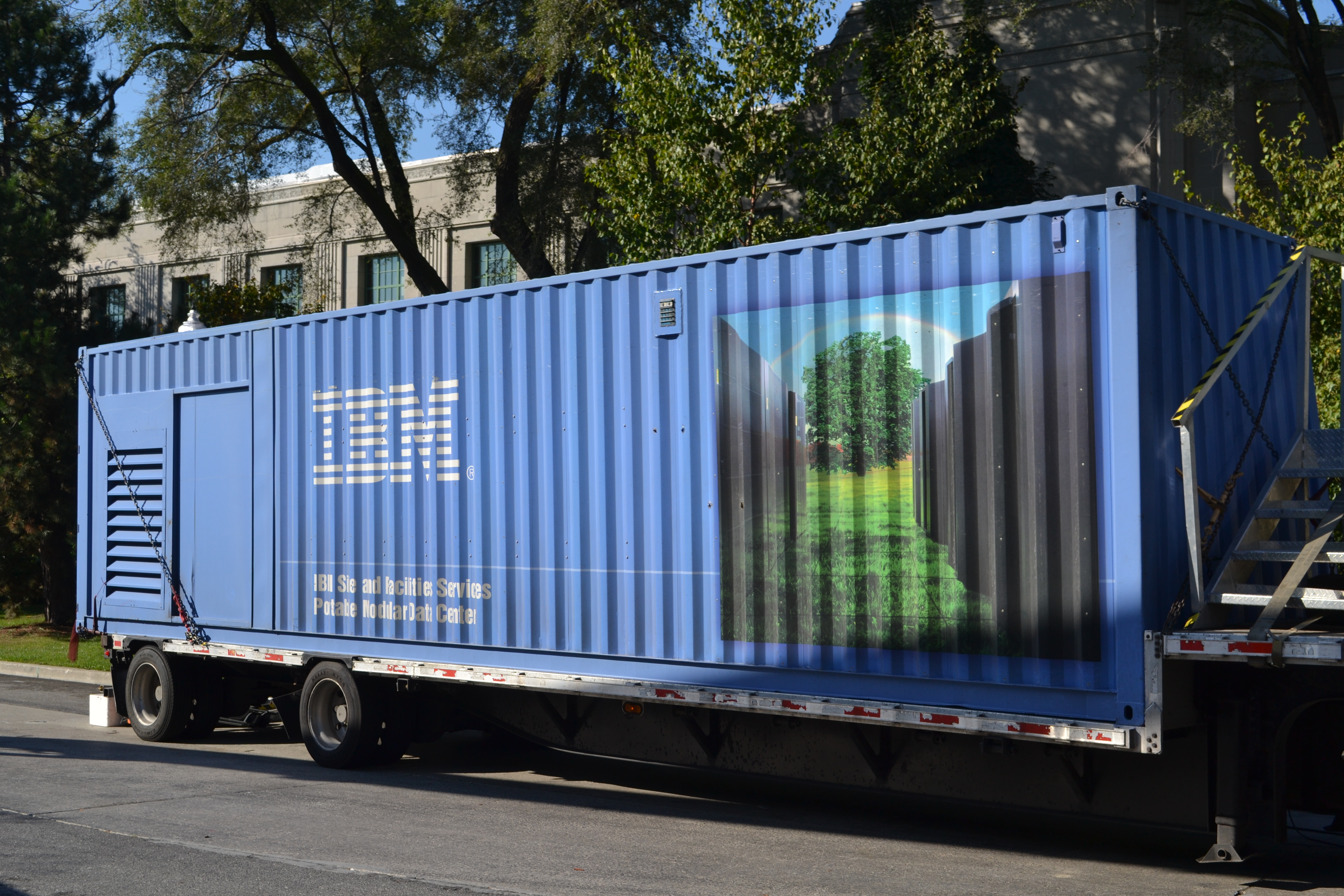
A 40-foot (12 m) Portable Modular Data Center

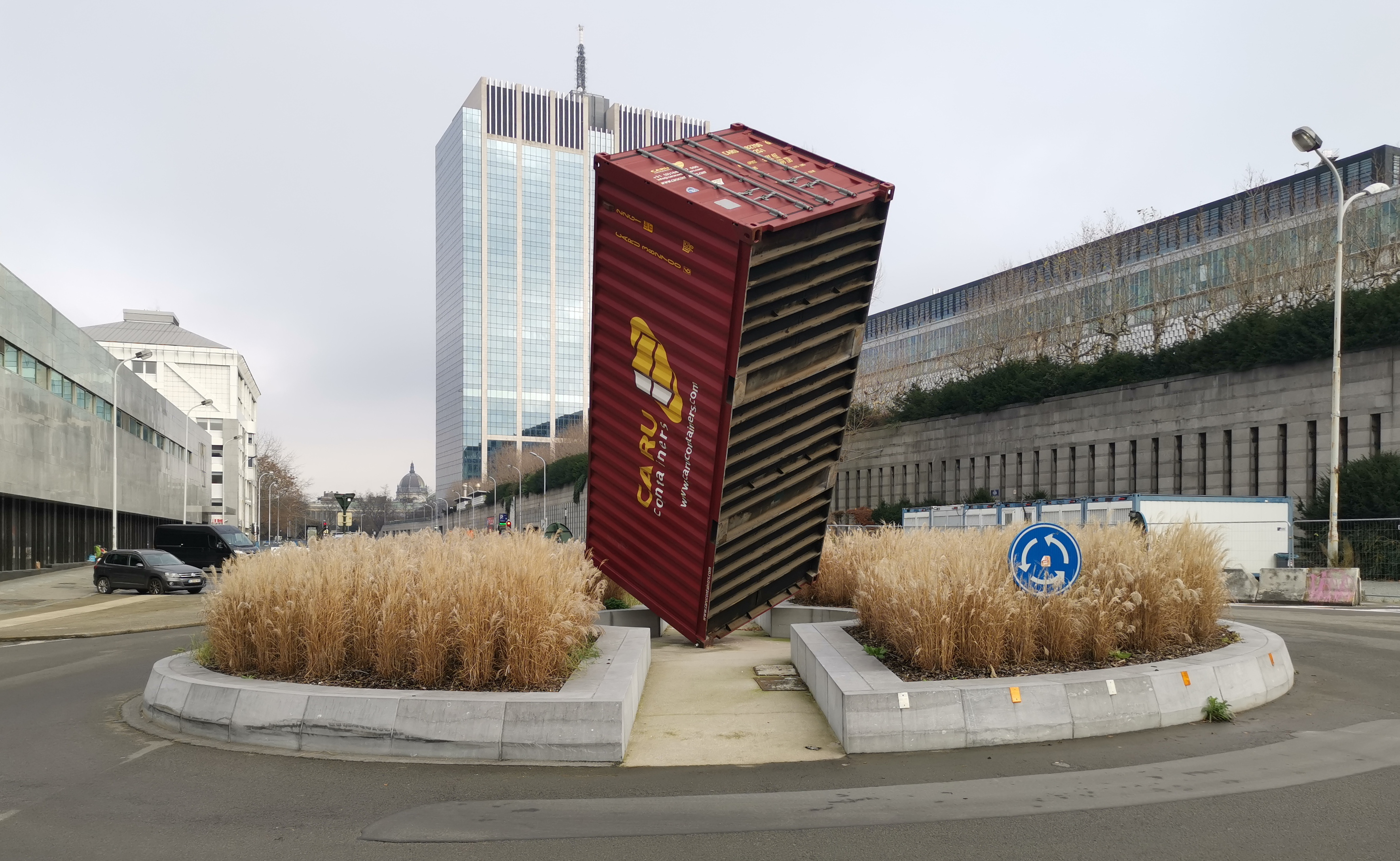
Shipping container as a roundabout artwork

Shipping containers have also been used as:

- Affordable housing
- Press boxes
- Emergency hurricane shelters for thoroughbred horses
- Concession stands
- Fire training facility
- Military training facility
- Emergency shelters
- School buildings
- Apartment and office buildings
- Artists' studios
- Stores
- Moveable exhibition spaces on rails
- Telco hubs
- Bank vaults
- Medical clinics
- Radar stations
- Shopping malls
- Sleeping rooms
- Ablution
- Recording studios
- Abstract art
- Transportable factories
- Modular data centers (e.g. Sun Modular Datacenter, Portable Modular Data Center)
- Experimental labs
- Combatant temporary containment (ventilated)
- Bathrooms
- Showers
- Coffeehouses
- Workshops
- Intermodal sealed storage on ships, trucks, and trains
- House foundations on unstable seismic zones
- Elevator/stairwell shafts
- Block roads and keep protesters away, as photo journalized during the Pakistan Long March
- Hotels
- Construction trailers
- Mine site accommodations
- Exploration camp
- Aviation maintenance facilities for the United States Marine Corps when loaded onto the SS Wright (T-AVB-3) or the SS Curtiss (T-AVB-4)
- RV campers
- Food trucks
- Hydroponics farms
- Battery storage units
- Temporary prisons
- Intensive-care units in temporary hospitals during the COVID-19 pandemic

== Alternative housing and architecture ==
Shipping container housing for students in Copenhagen

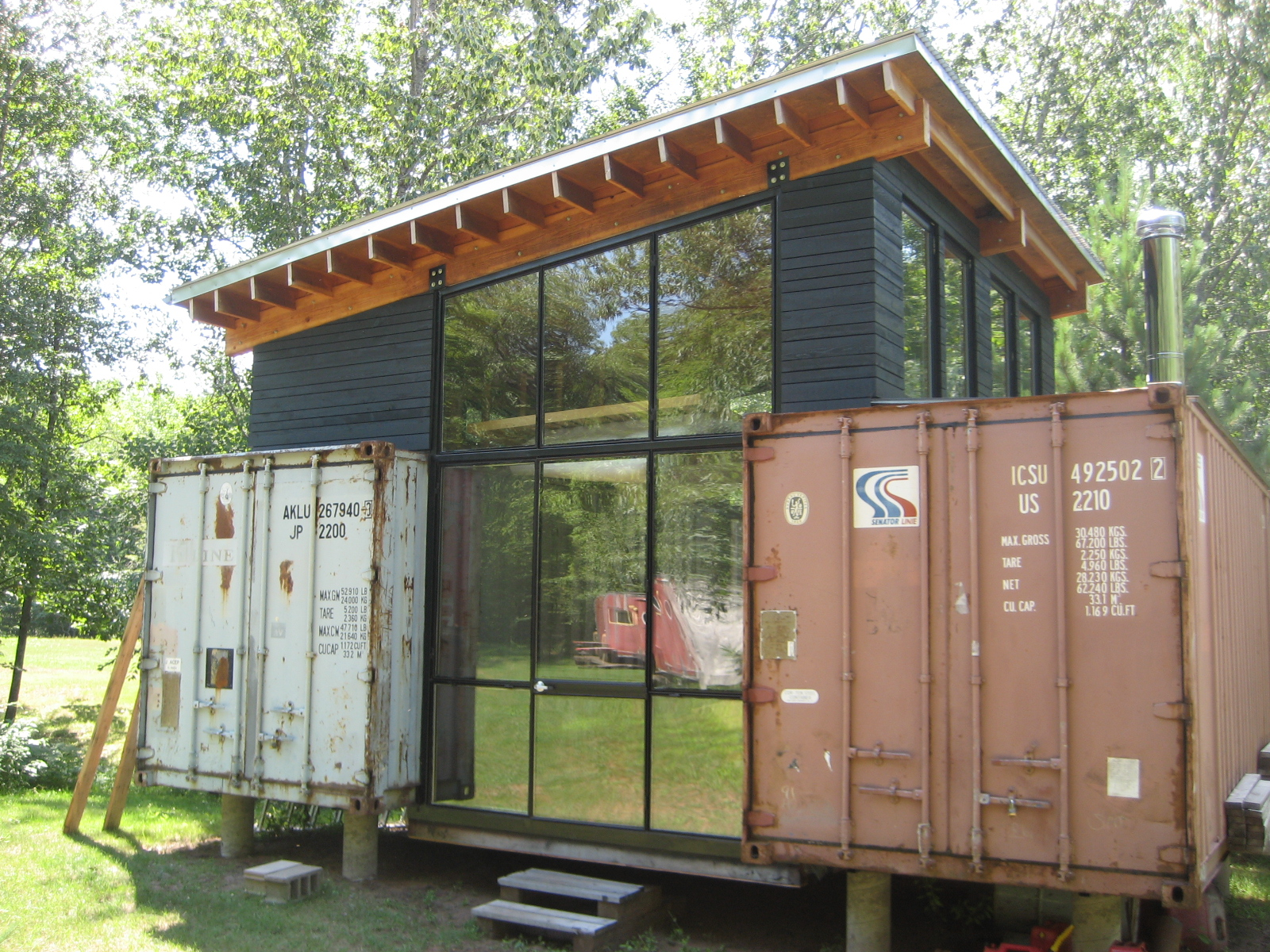
Shipping container cottage

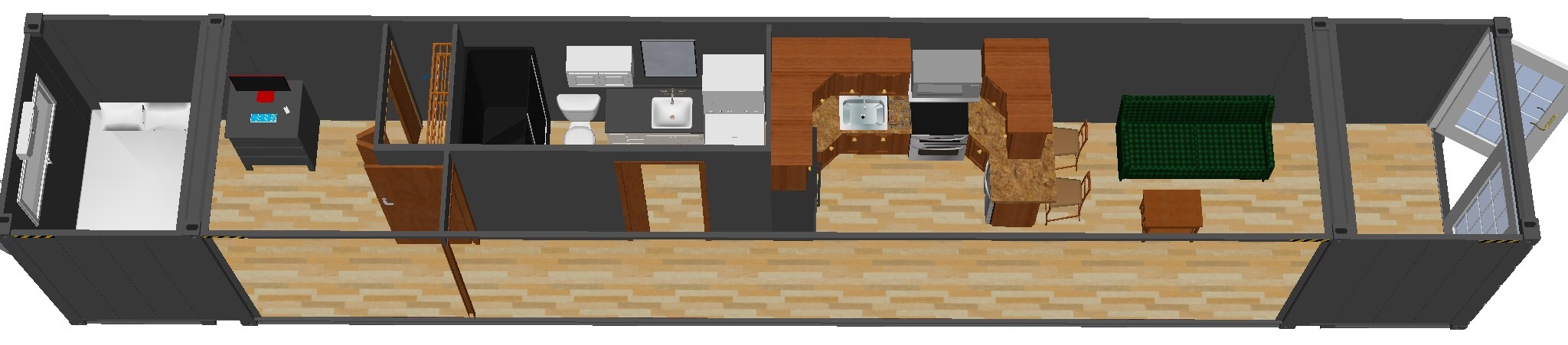
53-foot reefer container home

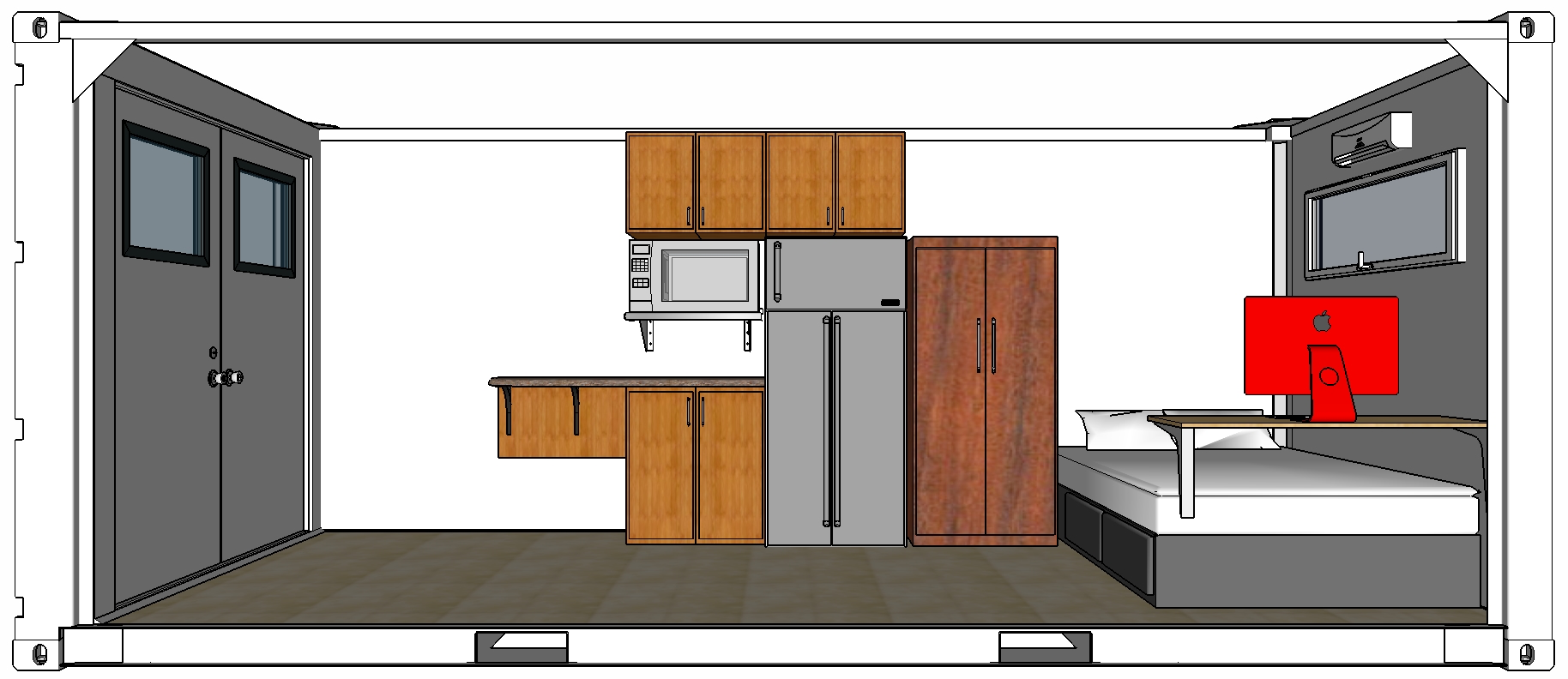
20-foot reefer container home

The abundance and relative cheapness of these containers during the last decade comes from the deficit in manufactured goods coming from North America in the last two decades. These manufactured goods come to North America from Asia and, to a lesser extent, Europe, in containers that often have to be shipped back empty, or "deadhead", at considerable expense. It is often cheaper to buy new containers in Asia than to ship old ones back. Therefore, new applications are sought for the used containers that have reached their North American destination.

Containers are in many ways an ideal building material because they are strong, durable, stackable, cuttable, movable, modular, plentiful, and relatively cheap. Architects, as well as laypeople, have used them to build many types of buildings such as homes, offices, apartments, schools, dormitories, artists' studios, and emergency shelters; they have also been used as swimming pools. They are also used to provide temporary secure spaces on construction sites, and other venues on an "as is" basis, instead of building shelters.

CONEX containers were developed by Malcom McLean to standardize the intermodal shipping unit. CONEX containers may or may not meet the requirements of local building codes. As they are not field erected, a registered engineer or architect must verify that the containers comply with the structural requirements of the building code. The 2021 ICC code was amended to address CONEX containers.

Phillip C. Clark filed for a United States patent on November 23, 1987, described as "Method for converting one or more steel shipping containers into a habitable building at a building site and the product thereof". This patent was granted August 8, 1989 as patent 4854094. The patent documentation shows what are possibly the earliest recorded plans for constructing shipping container housing and shelters by laying out some very basic architectural concepts. Regardless, the patent may not have represented novel invention at its time of filing. Paul Sawyers previously described extensive shipping container buildings used on the set of the 1985 film Space Rage Breakout on Prison Planet.

Other examples of earlier container architecture concepts include a 1977 report entitled "Shipping Containers as Structural Systems", investigating the feasibility of using 20-foot (6.1 m) shipping containers as structural elements by the US military.

During the 1991 Gulf War, containers saw considerable nonstandard uses, not only as makeshift shelters, but also for housing of US soldiers. The shipping containers were equipped with air conditioning units and provided shelter as well as protection from artillery shelling.

It has been rumored that some shipping containers were used for transportation of Iraqi prisoners of war, with holes cut in the containers to allow for ventilation. Containers continue to be used for military shelters, often additionally fortified by adding sandbags to the side walls, to protect against weapons such as rocket-propelled grenades ("RPGs").

== Media ==
Shipping container architecture has inspired the reality television series Containables (DIY) and Container Homes (HGTV), in addition to being featured in episodes of Grand Designs (Channel 4) and Amazing Interiors (Netflix).

== See also ==
- Affordable housing
- Alternative housing
- Boxpark
- Container park
- Containerization
- Containerized housing unit
- Modular building
- Off-the-grid
- Prefabricated building
- Shipping container clinic
- Tiny house movement
- Upcycling
