= Area 506 Waterfront Container Village =

Waterfront marketplace in New Brunswick, Canada

AREA 506 Waterfront Container Village
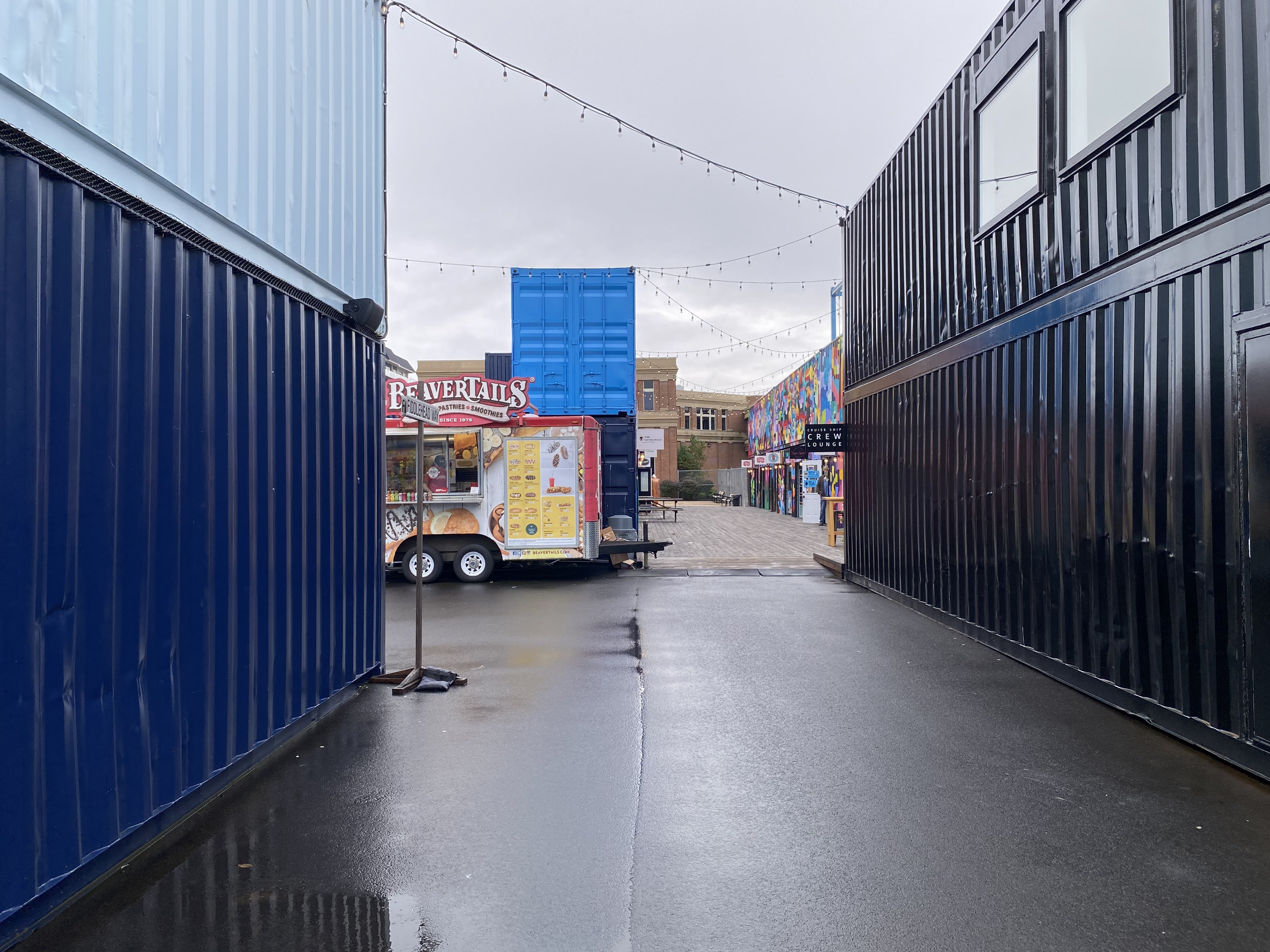
- Location: 85 Water Street; Saint John, New Brunswick, Canada; 45.2696692°N 66.062475°W
- Opening date: June 8, 2022
- Owner: Area 506
- Number of tenants: c. 40
- Website: area506.ca/container-village
- Interactive map of Area 506 Waterfront Container Village

The AREA 506 Waterfront Container Village is a waterfront marketplace located along the Saint John River in uptown Saint John, New Brunswick, Canada. It was created by local non-profit AREA 506, and constructed from shipping containers located in what was once a parking lot. The market includes vendors with shops created inside the containers themselves or in food trucks. The wide variety of onsite vendors range from retail and gift stores to snacks and coffee.

Founded by Ray Gracewood, the Waterfront Container Village first opened on June 8, 2022, and the seasonal market operates annually from May to November.

== Description ==
The AREA 506 Waterfront Container Village is a waterfront experience constructed from over 60 shipping containers. Built on a converted parking lot on the waterfront of Saint John, New Brunswick the Village features over two dozen vendors that operate out of either the shipping containers or food trucks, from retail and gift shops to snacks and coffee. The s feet as of its opening year, are also decorated by the work of multiple local and international artists, including "Graffiti Alley", one of the most photographed spaces in the province.

The marketplace is operated annually from May to November.

== History ==
On July 30, 2021, during the first AREA 506 Waterfront Concert Series, the announcement was made that proposed creation of the Container Village. In early 2022, work was already underway to repurpose shipping containers and what was once a waterfront parking lot and create a destination for tourists and local residents. In early May, containers started arriving to the site, and on June 8, 2022, the gates to the Waterfront Container Village opened for the first time, initially containing 54 shipping containers with 27 vendors, along with a three-level Viewing Deck and a stage for concerts. The marketplace's opening coincided with the docking of the Oasis of the Seas in Saint John - at the time, the city's largest cruise arrival.

In 2023, its second year of operation, the Container Village again opened ahead of the May long weekend with around a dozen new vendors, bringing the total to almost 40. Other site and infrastructure improvements also having been made.

On May 16, 2024, the gates opened for its third season. With over a dozen new art installations by local and international artists, a newly reimagined Container Lounge at The Docks and nine new vendors, the colourful Waterfront Container Village

== See also ==
- Dordoy Bazaar, a marketplace in Kyrgyzstan which also use shipping containers
- Re:START, a temporary mall in New Zealand also made using shipping containers
- Shipping container architecture
