= PMDC =

PMDC may refer to:

- Pakistan Mineral Development Corporation
- Pakistan Medical and Dental Council
- People's Movement for Democratic Change, a political party in Sierra Leone
- Permanent magnet direct current, a type of electric motor
- Portable Modular Data Center
