= Dordoy Bazaar =

Bazaar in Bishkek

Coordinates: 42°56′00″N 74°37′15″E

Dordoy Bazaar (Kyrgyz: Дордой Базары, romanized: Dordoi Bazary; Russian: Рынок Дордой) is a large wholesale and retail market in Bishkek, Kyrgyzstan. The largest bazaar in Kyrgyzstan, it is one of Asia's greatest public marketplaces, comparable to Bangkok's Chatuchak Weekend Market or Tehran's Grand Bazaar.

Dordoy Bazaar is a major shopping and employment centre for the Bishkek metropolitan area and entire Chuy River Valley region. It is also one of the main entrepôts through which consumer goods from China arrive at shops and markets in Kazakhstan, Russia, and Uzbekistan. According to some economists, this re-export (the other center for which, targeting Uzbekistan, is the Karasuu Bazar at Kara-Suu, Osh Region) is one of two largest economic activities of Kyrgyzstan.

== Location and organization ==
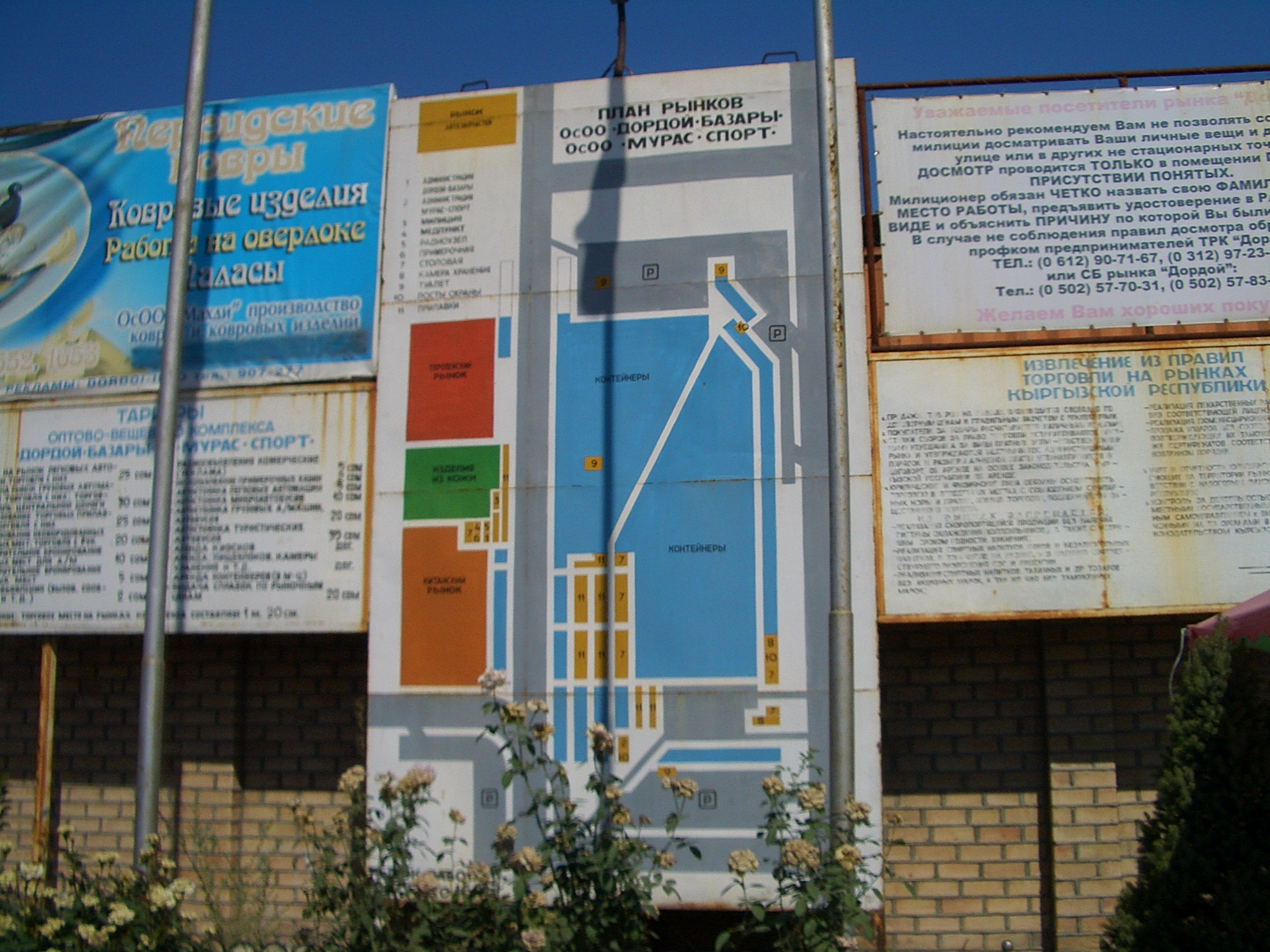
Announcement boards help merchants and shoppers find their way, and inform them of their legal rights.

The Dordoy market stretches for more than a kilometre on the north-eastern outskirts of Bishkek, near the bypass highway that skirts the city in the north. Legally, it is an agglomeration of several independent markets adjacent to each other. Since there are no fences, the borders between the markets are not particularly noticeable. According to a 2007 city atlas, the component markets are:

- Ak-Suu
- Vostok ('East')
- Sever ('North')
- Muras-Sport
- Alkanov i K ('Alkanov & Co.')
- Evropa ('Europe')
- Kerben
- Kitay ('China')
- Zhonghai (which formally is considered a separate market from Dordoy)

Most of the market is built of double-stacked shipping containers. Typically, the lower container is a shop, while the upper one provides storage. According to a 2005 newspaper report, there were 6,000 to 7,000 containers in the bazaar. As of March 2024, approximately 70,000 people work officially and unofficially in connection to Dordoy.

The containers, organized in dozens of rows, form streets and plazas of a sort covering the equivalent of 160 rugby fields. Smaller buildings between the blocks of containers house restaurants, administrative offices, toilets, hotels, and other ancillary structures.

== History ==
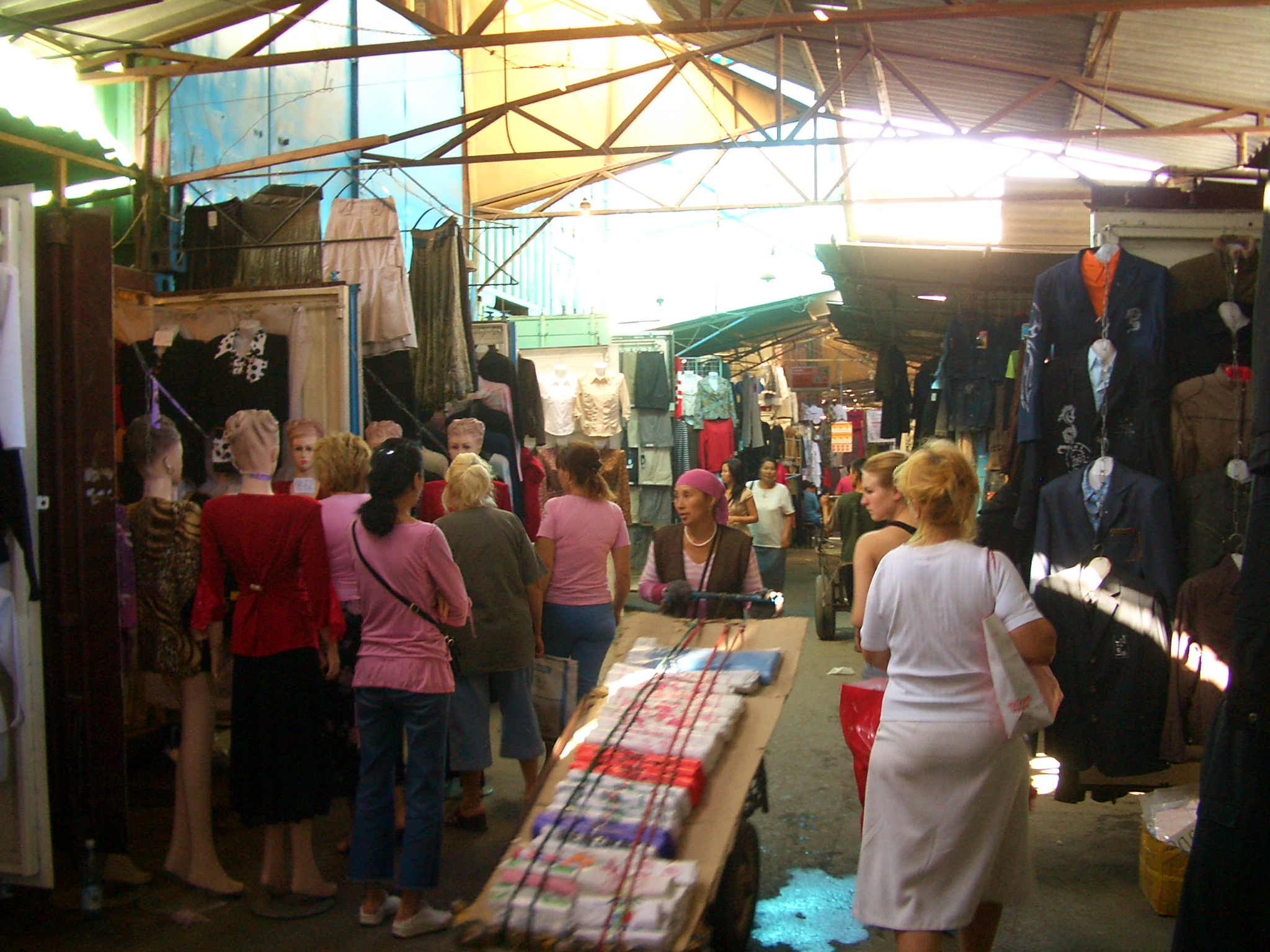
A busy day in the apparel section

The market is said to date from 1992, its 15th anniversary being celebrated in 2007. In the view of journalists from the neighbouring Uzbekistan, one of the causes for the rise of Bishkek's Dordoy Bazaar was the decline of Uzbekistan's major wholesale markets. After the Uzbek government transferred Tashkent's huge Hippodrome Market to the jurisdiction of the Ministry of the Interior in 1998, increased police harassment of the trader resulted in Hippodrome losing its dominant position in the region. After its reconstruction in 2002–2003, Hippodrome, which once had 8,600 trading outlets and 18,000 traders, was succeeded by the much smaller Chilanzar goods market with 2,540 outlets. A similar story took place in Jizzakh, where in 2006 authorities closed the Dunyo Bozori (Uzbek for "World Market") marketplace (which had been established by Chinese traders) to replace it with the Abu Sahiy Nur shopping centre. As Uzbekistan's markets declined, purchasing by Uzbek buyers has shifted to Kyrgyzstan's Bishkek or Kara-Suu.

== Ownership and management ==
The Dordoy market hosts a variety of independent business entities:

- Alkan Bazary LLC
- Muras Sport LLC
- Dordoi Bazaary LLC
- Oberon LLC
- Junhai Dordoi LLC
- Almamatur LLC
- Dordoi Avtozapchasti LLC

In total, over 15 independent companies operate within the complex.

== The traders ==
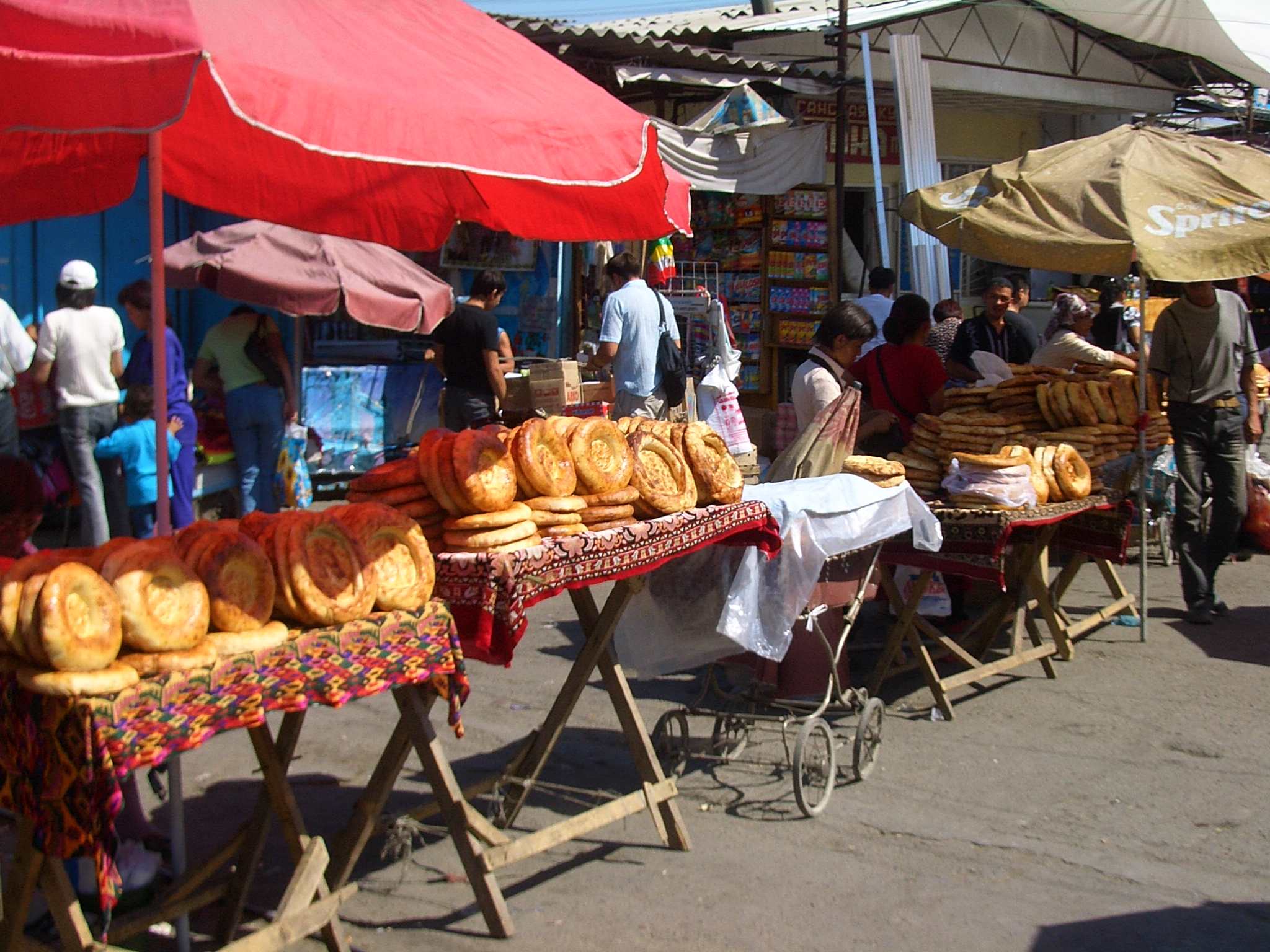
Naan vendors sell food to shopkeepers and market-goers

Different sections of the markets specialize in various types of consumer goods, including clothing, shoes, furniture, electric and electronic equipment, toys, automotive supplies, construction materials, etc. While some kinds of groceries (e.g. factory-packaged canned goods or sweets) are sold at Dordoy, it is not a produce market. Occasional produce vendors are present merely to feed the vendors and customers.

Most of the goods sold at Dordoy arrive from China, with the second largest source (perhaps 30% of all imports) being Turkey. One can also find clothing from Thailand and Europe, music CDs from Russia, and goods from many other countries in Eurasia, as well as a selection of local products.

Although many of the people working and shopping at the Bazaar speak Kyrgyz, Russian is the main language used in trade.

== Transportation ==
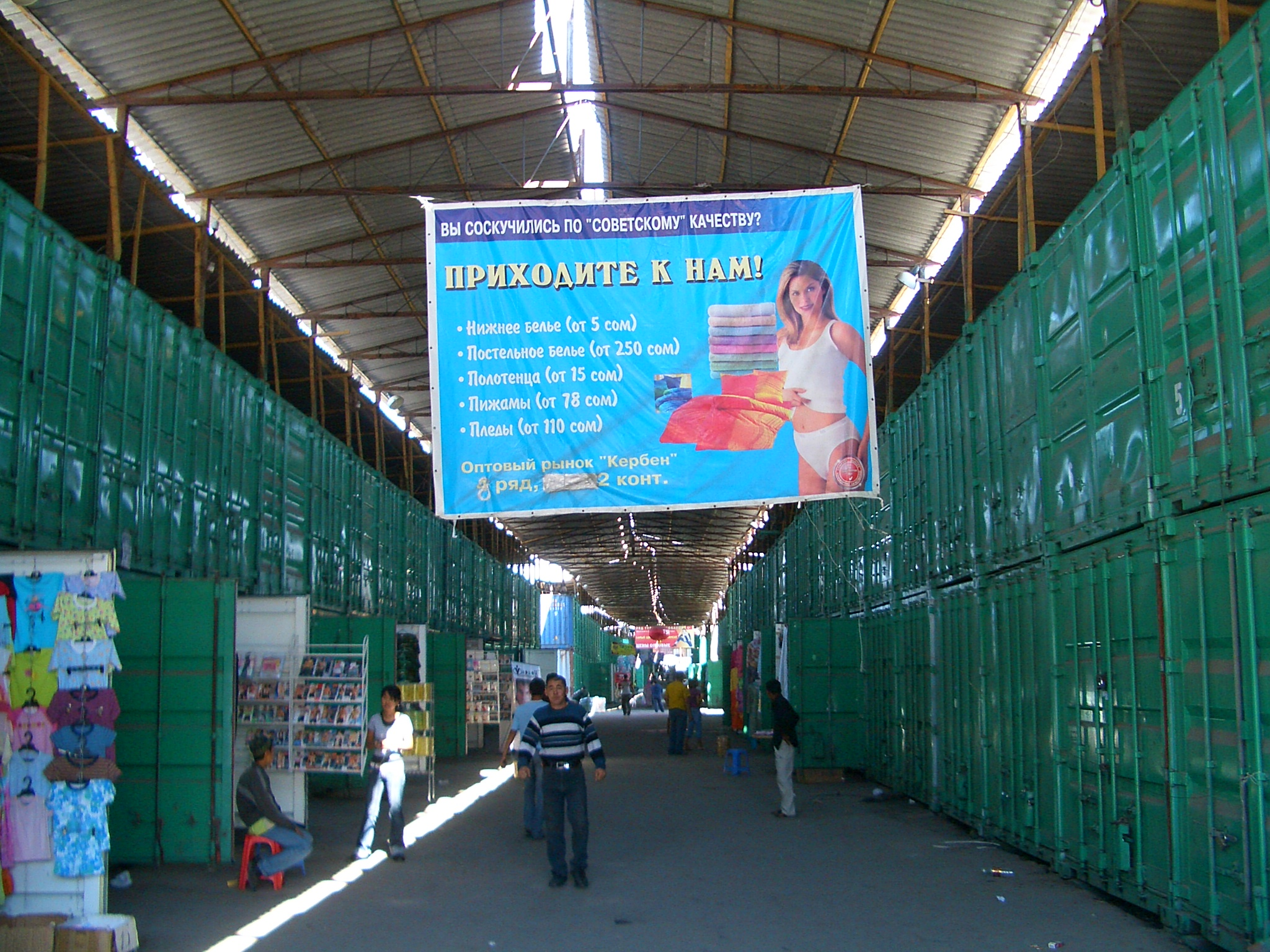
A typical clothing aisle, but with only a few containers open

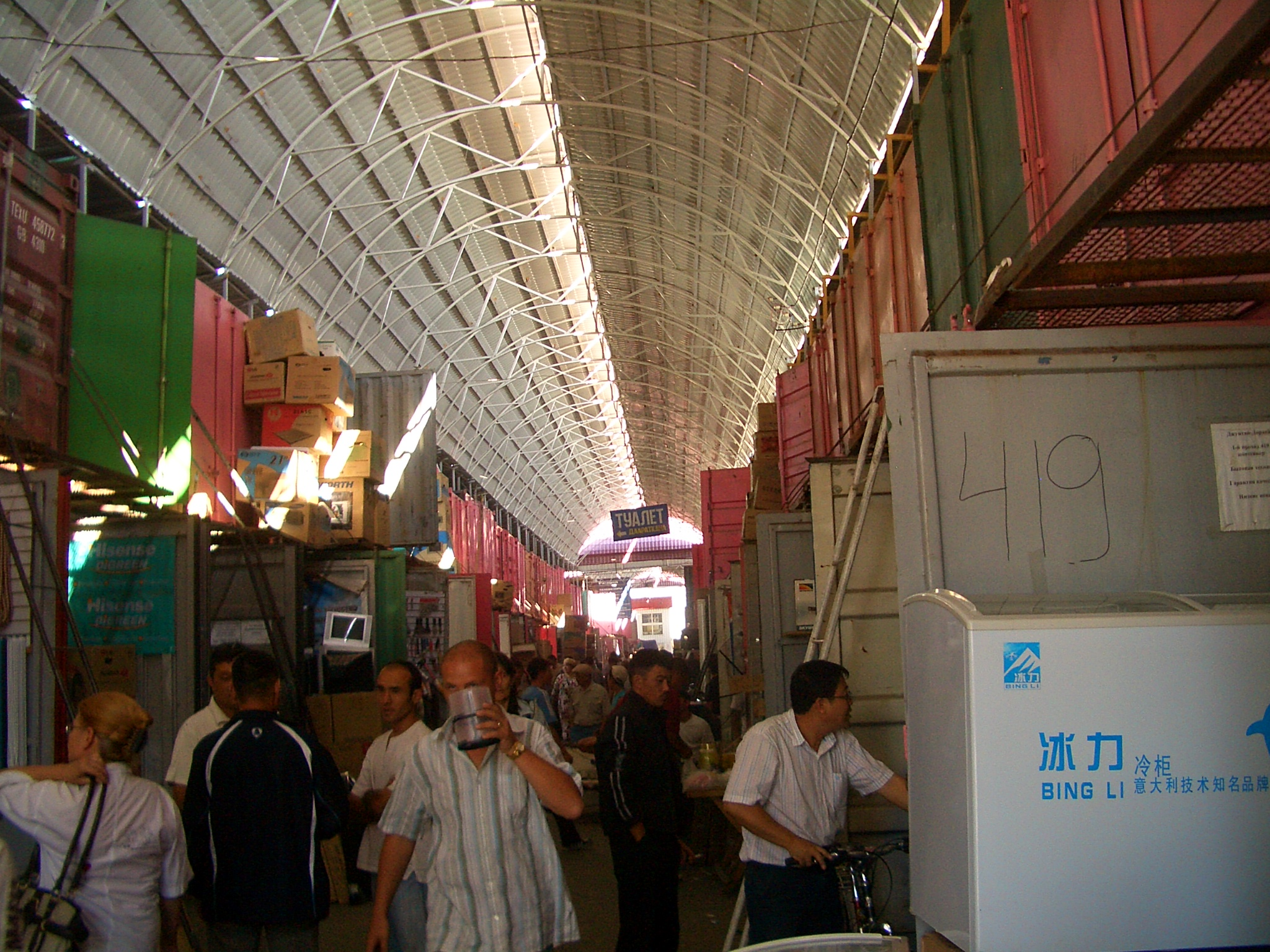
Brisk trade in Bishkek's Dordoy Bazaar

There is no rail access to the market: all goods enter and depart the bazaar by truck or car.

Two large plazas near the northern and southern ends of the market are connected by frequent minibus service with central Bishkek. From the northern plaza, minibuses also run to various points throughout Chüy Region, including Sokuluk, Kant, Tokmok, and Korday border crossing (on the Kazakhstan border). For the convenience of the "shuttle traders", charter buses run from Dordoy to several major cities in Kazakhstan and in Russia's Urals and Western Siberia.

== See also ==
- Area 506 Waterfront Container Village, a marketplace in New Brunswick, Canada, that also utilizes shipping containers
- Bazaar
- Market (place)
- Retail
- Shipping container architecture
- Souq
