= Applied Minds =

American technology studio, founded 2000

Applied Minds, LLC

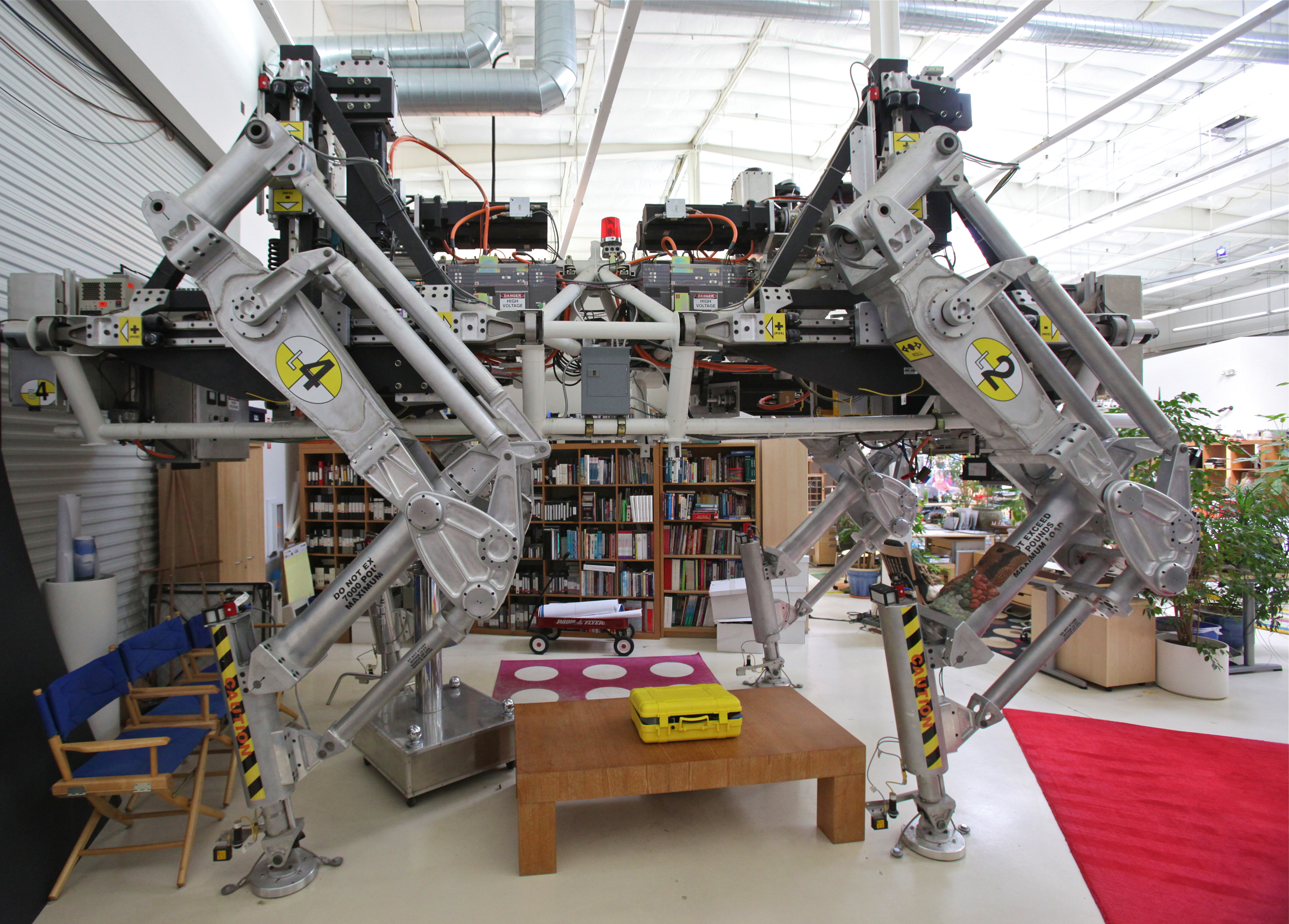
- Interior of Applied Minds in 2013
- Type: Private
- Industry: Electronics; Software; Consulting; Biotechnology; Architectural design
- Founded: 2000
- Headquarters: Burbank, California, US
- Key people: Bran Ferren, co-chairman; Danny Hillis, co-chairman; Story Musgrave, Imagineer
- Website: appliedminds.com

Applied Minds, LLC is an American technology studio founded in 2000 by Bran Ferren, Danny Hillis, and Doug Carlston. The company provides a range of services for government and commercial customers, including technology design and development, rapid prototyping, engineering, research and development (R&D), and consulting. The company is headquartered in Burbank, California, with offices in New York City and Washington, D.C.

== History and culture ==
Bran Ferren and Danny Hillis worked together at Walt Disney Imagineering, where Ferren was president of research & development and creative technology and Hillis his vice president, when they decided to start a new venture that would serve wider industries beyond entertainment. When the pair left to start Applied Minds in 2000, they rented the new company's first warehouse space from Disney.

Applied Minds "quickly acquired a reputation as a sort of military-industrial toy shop." The culture at the company has been described as "laid back, more startup than military, with employees in casual clothes and readily available snacks." According to Applied Minds co-founder and chief creative officer Ferren, potential projects are evaluated on the basis of three criteria: "design and technical excellence, making the world a better place, and making more money than [the company] spends." Ferren "takes a unique approach to building his team" by likening the process to casting roles for "engineers, designers, military strategists, and rocket scientists."

In 2005, the team building a new centralized database to improve Internet searches spun off from Applied Minds to create a separate company called Metaweb Technologies. Metaweb's database, Freebase, structured information as millions of related entities, so that software could generate shorter, more relevant responses to users' search queries. Google acquired Metaweb in 2010 and stated part of the acquisition was to improve search and make the web richer and more meaningful for everyone.

The firm has spun out several companies, including Metaweb Technologies, TouchTable, which specializes in interactive mapping visualizations, and Applied Proteomics, whose early-stage cancer diagnostics business was acquired by DiscernDx in 2018.

In 2014, Danny Hillis spun off a portion of the company into a venture called Applied Invention.

== Projects ==
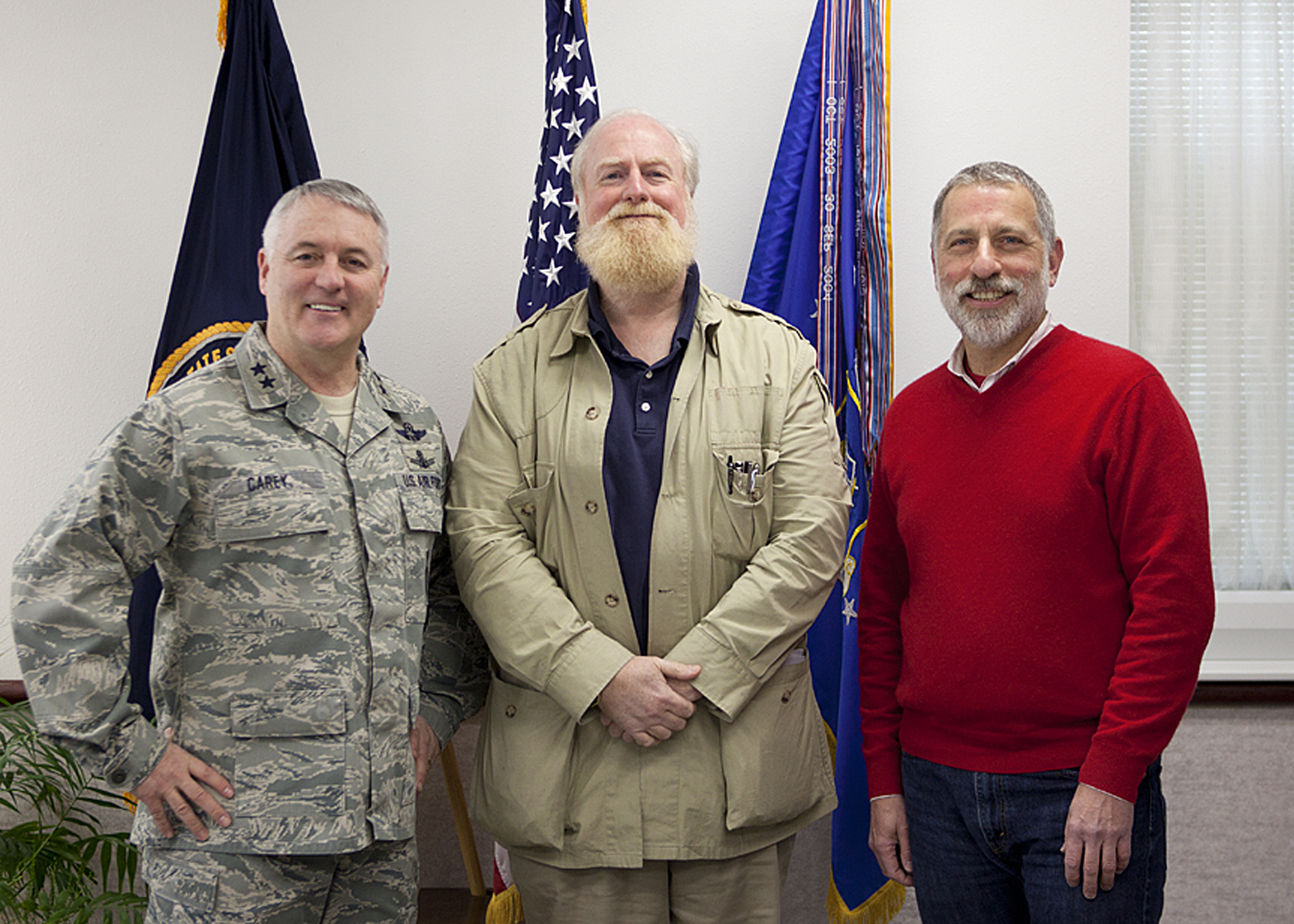
Maj. Gen. Michael Carey, Eric Angelson, and Bran Ferren

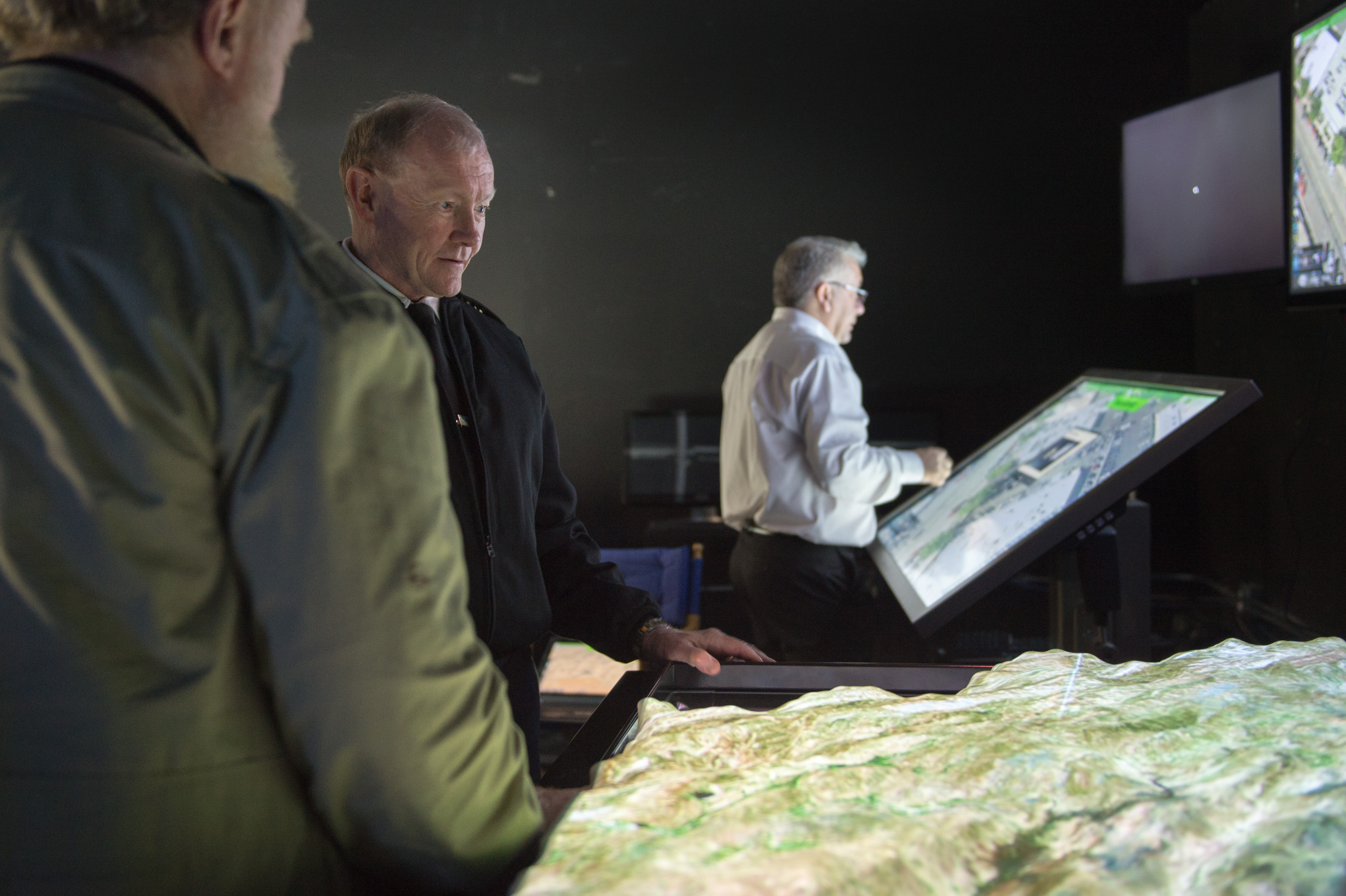
Chairman of the Joint Chiefs of Staff Gen. Martin E. Dempsey tours Applied Minds' interactive 3D maps showcase in 2013.

Some of the clients involved with Applied Minds include General Motors, Intel, Smithsonian, Northrop Grumman, Lockheed Martin, Herman Miller, Harris Corporation, Sony, Sun Microsystems, and every branch of the United States military.

In 2005, through a partnership with Herman Miller, Applied Minds created a technology to scramble conversations for the privacy and productivity of office workers. Called Babble, the device uses a sound processor to capture voices within range and then repeats back random segments of speech to create an undecipherable hum of background noise. Babble earned several awards for Herman Miller in 2005: the Best of Innovations Award from the Consumer Electronics Association, Best of NeoCon Gold Award in Workplace Technology, and inclusion on Esquire Magazine's annual "Best and Brightest" list.

The Air Force through its Air Force Research Lab were researching ways to minimize and prevent helicopter brownout conditions, which occur when rotors kick up fine sand, dust, and debris, reducing visibility and leading to three out of four chopper accidents overseas. Applied Minds produced a prototype for a Photographic Landing Augmentation System for Helicopters (or PhLASH), which uses high-intensity infrared strobes to capture a series of high-resolution images of the landing area before brownout occurs. The system then processes these images into a video-like display that is geo-rectified to the aircraft's current position, so the pilot can navigate the simulated landing area from the instrument panel regardless of visibility conditions outside. In 2007, the Office of the Secretary of Defense selected the PhLASH "see and remember" prototype system to receive quick-reaction funding to develop a permanent installation onboard military helicopters.

In 2010, a Mayflower test satellite built by Applied Minds in partnership with Northrop Grumman became the first commercial CubeSat deployed into orbit by SpaceX, and the first spacecraft to prove the viability of a novel solar cell deployment system.

In 2013, an Apple lawsuit against Samsung over the pinch-to-zoom feature was invalidated because the function was previously patented to Applied Minds cofounders Ferren and Hillis in 2005 to describe multi-touch gestures.

To enable troops to build on-demand solutions to their challenges, Applied Minds worked with the Army's Rapid Equipping Force (REF) to create deployable Expeditionary Lab – Mobile (ELM) modules. Enclosed in a standard 20-foot container that can be transported by helicopter, the ELMs include 3D printers, CNC machines, laser cutters, plasma cutters, welding equipment, and other rapid prototyping tools. The mobile laboratories enable engineers to design and fabricate technologies to address the problems they encounter in remote outposts, where it typically takes years to deliver new technologies. The first ELMs were deployed to forward operating bases by the Army in 2012 and 2013.

In 2015, Applied Minds debuted the KiraVan at the Specialty Equipment Market Association (SEMA) Show in Las Vegas, after five years of development on the custom built expedition mobility platform. The KiraVan is a 51,700-pound expedition vehicle that serves as a public showcase and experimental demonstrator for technologies developed by Applied Minds. It is a successor to the earlier MaxiMog vehicle that was showcased at the Museum of Modern Art in New York.

In 2011, it was announced that Applied Minds was leading the design work on the Clock of the Long Now ("10,000-year clock") for the Long Now Foundation, which was founded by Hillis in 1996. He had begun working on the clock in 1989.

=== Awards ===
The Smithsonian American Art Museum named Applied Minds as the winner of its international design competition to renovate the Renwick Gallery's Grand Salon in 2013. The company's concept proposes deploying high-definition projectors and speakers to create an immersive and changeable display environment without altering the building's historic structure.

In 2016, Applied Minds was awarded the Coolest Tech Award at the Consumer Electronics Show in Las Vegas, Nevada for its submission in partnership with Genworth, a long-term care insurance company. The Genworth R70i Aging Experience is a wearable exoskeleton designed to provoke a national conversation about aging by simulating its effects on the wearer's hearing, vision, and mobility.
