= Sun Modular Datacenter =

Portable data center built into a 20-foot shipping container

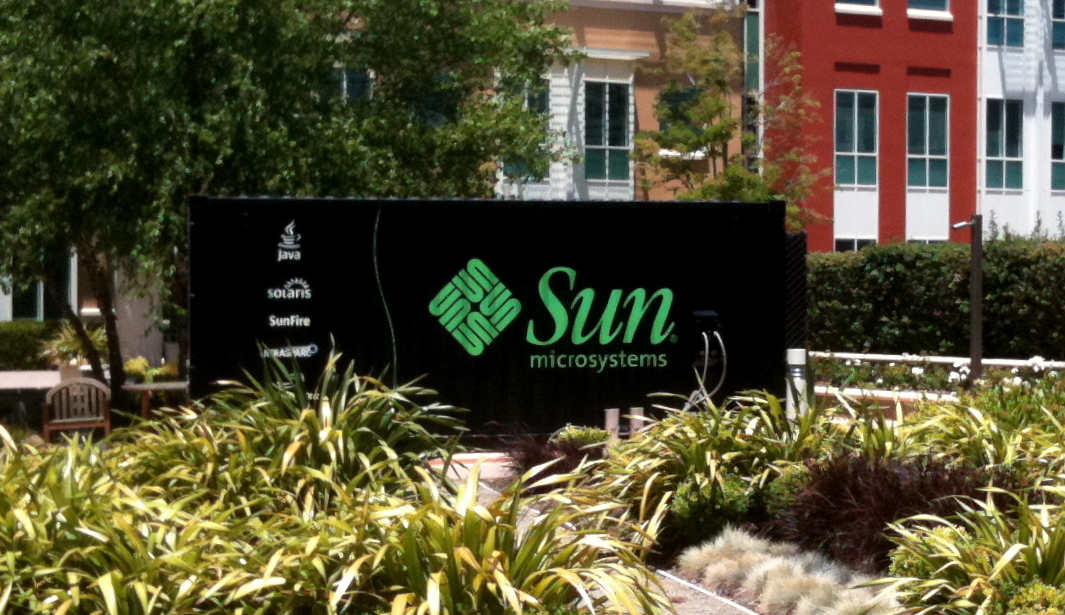
A Sun Modular Datacenter on display at the Sun Microsystems Executive Briefing Center in Menlo Park, California

Sun Modular Datacenter (Sun MD, known in the prototype phase as Project Blackbox) is a portable data center built into a standard 20-foot intermodal container (shipping container), manufactured and marketed by Sun Microsystems (acquired in 2010 by Oracle Corporation). A data center of up to 280 servers could be rapidly deployed using existing standardized transport methods to locations that might not be suitable for a building or other structure, and connecting it to the required infrastructure (including an external chiller and power source). Sun stated that the system could be made operational for 1% of the cost of building a traditional data center.

== History ==
The goal, as conceived by Greg Papadopoulos and Dave Douglas from Sun Labs and Danny Hillis from Applied Minds, was to design the largest possible "thumb drive" that could still be easily transported worldwide by truck, rail, or air. Since intermodal container transportation infrastructure exists in nearly every country, their answer was a 20-foot standard shipping container, modified to support eight 40RU compute racks populated with servers, storage, and other equipment. The initial target markets included secure portable data centers, and disaster relief to allow Internet access for email and insurance forms.

The prototype build was hosted at the Applied Minds facility, managed by Adam Yates from Applied Minds and Russ Rinfret from Sun. The prototype was first announced as "Project Blackbox" in October 2006; a Project Blackbox with 1088 AMD Opteron processors ranked #412 on the June 2007 TOP500 list. The product was officially announced in January 2008.

== Team ==
=== Marketing ===
- Darlene Yaplee, senior director
- Michael Bohlig, marketing lead
- Cheryl Martin, marketing lead
- Bob Schilmoeller, technical marketing
- Joe Carvalho, technical marketing

=== Engineering ===
- Jud Cooley, senior director for the project
- Chuck Perry, software and environmental systems design lead
- Russ Rinfret, mechanical engineering manager
- Lee Follmer, mechanical engineering lead
- Tim Jolly, mechanical engineer
- Alex Barandian, mechanical engineer
- Chris Wooley, mechanical engineer
- Chris Spect, mechanical engineer
- Carl Meske, software and environmental systems engineer
- Jeff Galloway, supply and vendor management

== Customers ==
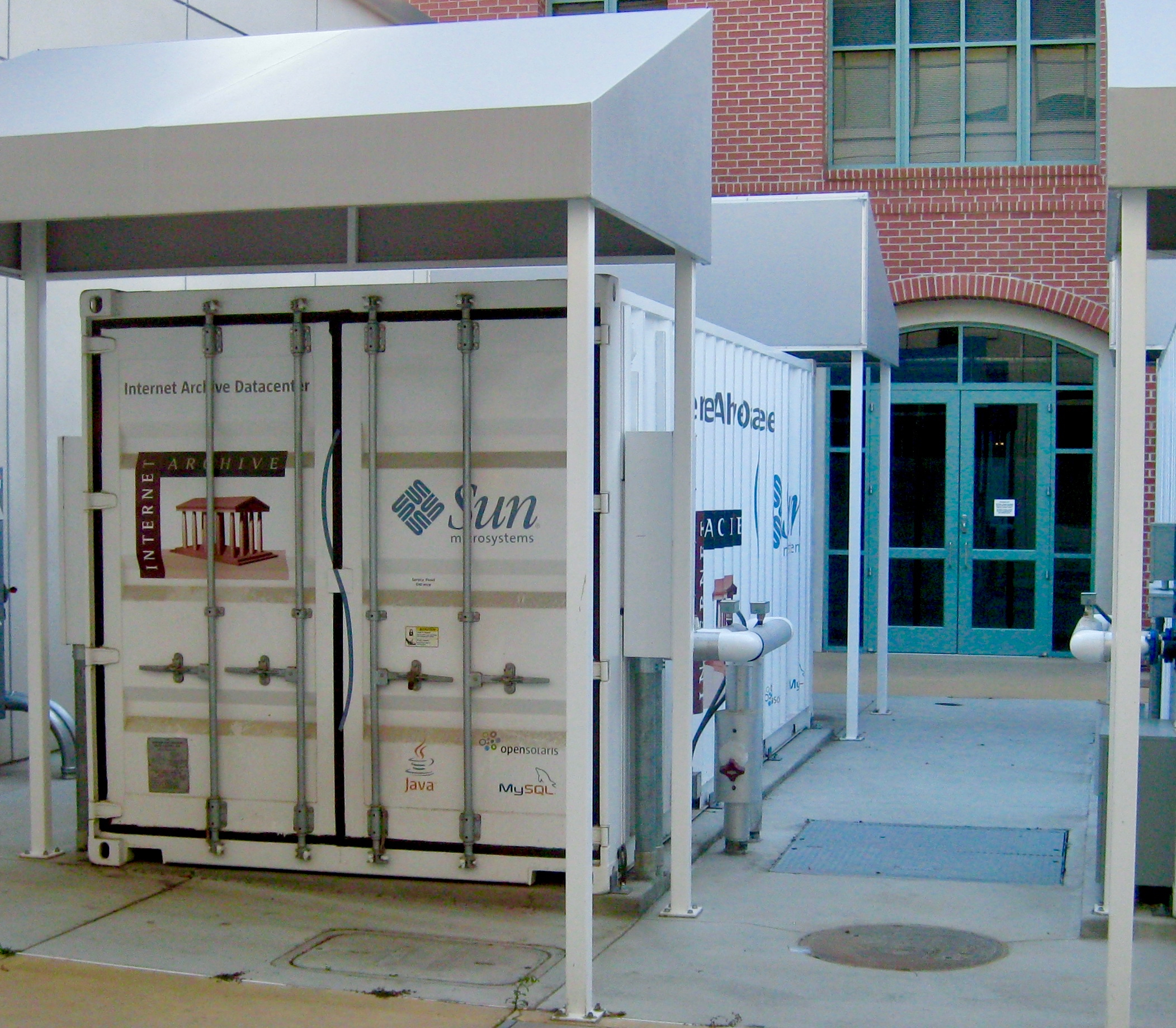
The Internet Archive data facility

On 14 July 2007, the SLAC National Accelerator Laboratory deployed a Sun MD containing 252 Sun Fire X2200 compute nodes as a compute farm.

In March 2009, the Internet Archive migrated its digital archive into a Sun MD, hosted at Sun's Santa Clara headquarters campus, a realization of a paper written by Archive employees in late 2003 proposing "an outdoor petabyte JBOD NAS box" of sufficient capacity to store the then-current Archive in a 40' shipping container.

Other customers included Radboud University.
