= Modular data center =

Type of data centre

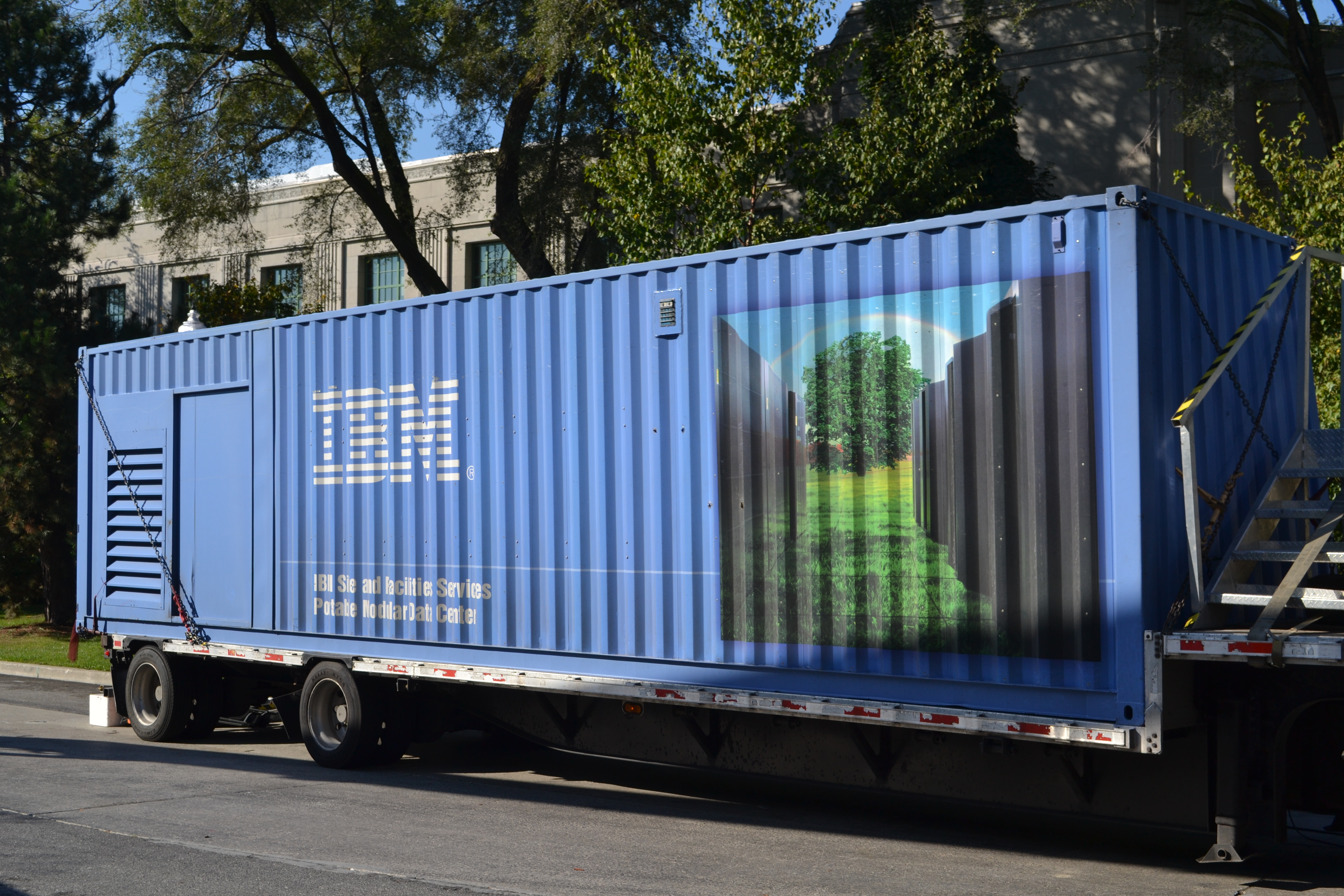
A 40-foot Portable Modular Data Center.

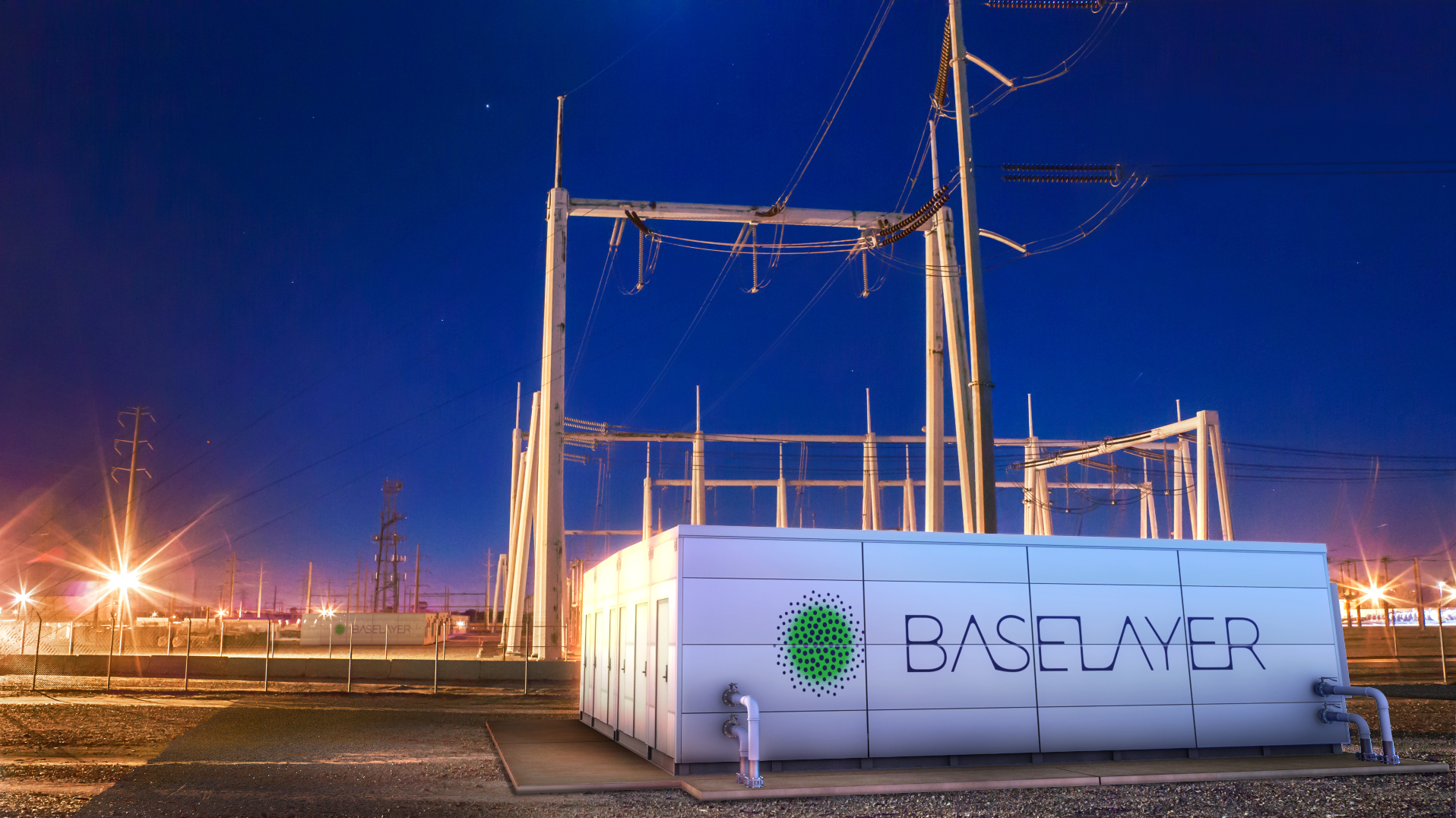
A modular data center connected to the power grid at a utility substation

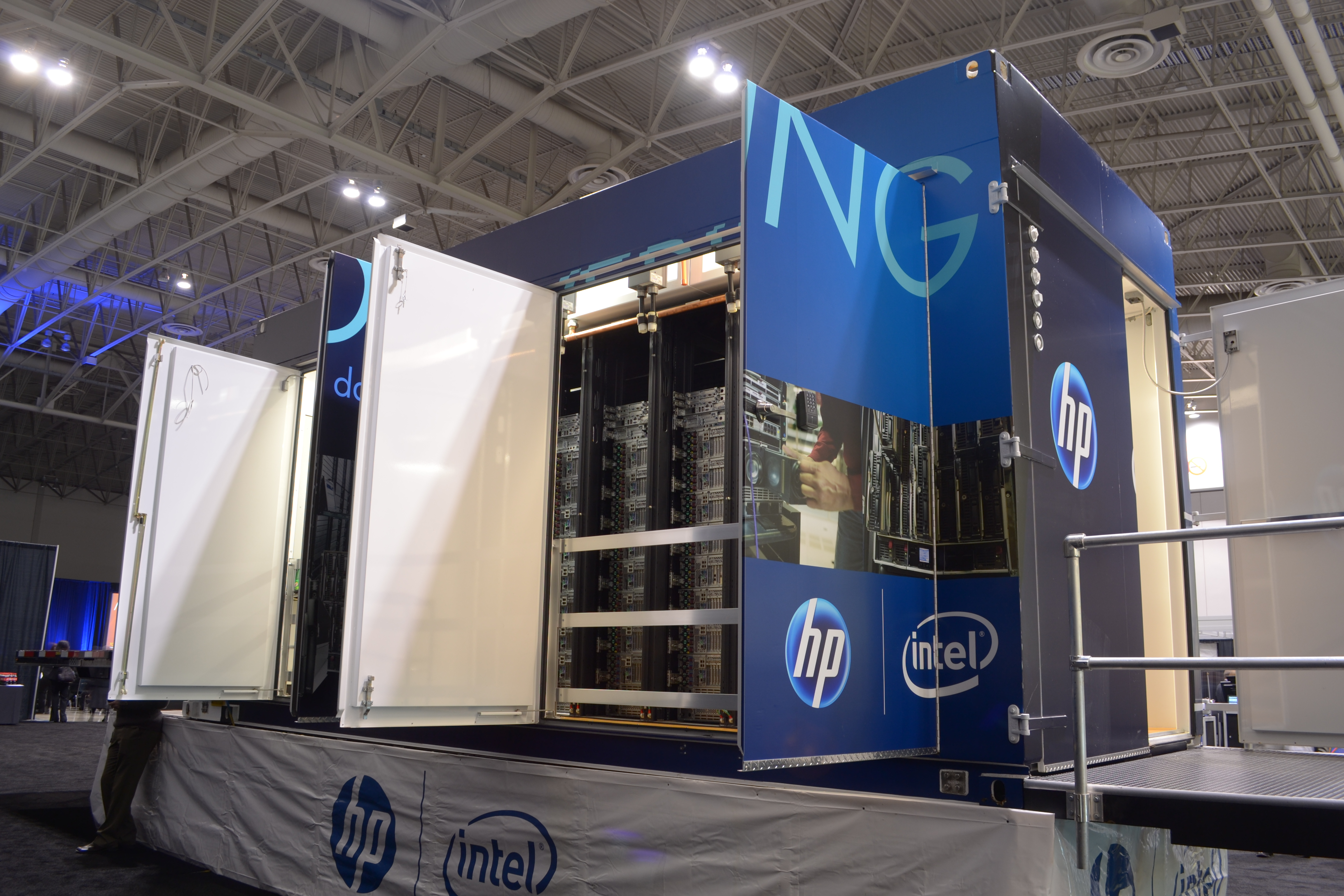
HP Performance Optimized Datacenter, model 240a.

A modular data center system is a portable method of deploying data center capacity. A modular data center can be placed anywhere data capacity is needed.

Modular data center systems consist of purpose-engineered modules and components to offer scalable data center capacity with multiple power and cooling options. Modules can be shipped to be added, integrated or retrofitted into an existing data center or combined into a system of modules. Modular data centers typically consist of standardized components.

Modular data centers are often marketed as converged infrastructure, promoting economies of scale and efficient energy usage, including considerations regarding the external environment. A module can be treated as a single unit for U.S. Federal Communications Commission compliance certification rather than all discrete systems. Patents have been taken out on variations.

== Types ==
Modular data centers typically come in two types of form factors. The more common type, referred to as containerized data centers or portable modular data centers, fits data center equipment (servers, storage and networking equipment) into a standard shipping container, which is then transported to a desired location. Containerized data centers typically come outfitted with their own cooling systems. Cisco makes an example of this type of data center, called the Cisco Containerized Data Center.

Another form of modular data center fits data center equipment into a facility composed of prefabricated components that can be quickly built on a site and added to as capacity is needed. For example, HP's version of this type of modular data center is constructed of sheet metal components that are formed into four data center halls linked by a central operating building. In 2012, Compass Datacenters, LLC filed and was later granted a patent for a "Truly modular building datacenter facility."

== Examples ==
- HP Performance Optimized Datacenter
- IBM Portable Modular Data Center
- Microsoft Azure Modular Datacenter
- Sun Modular Datacenter
