= Mobile home =

Prefabricated structure attached to a chassis

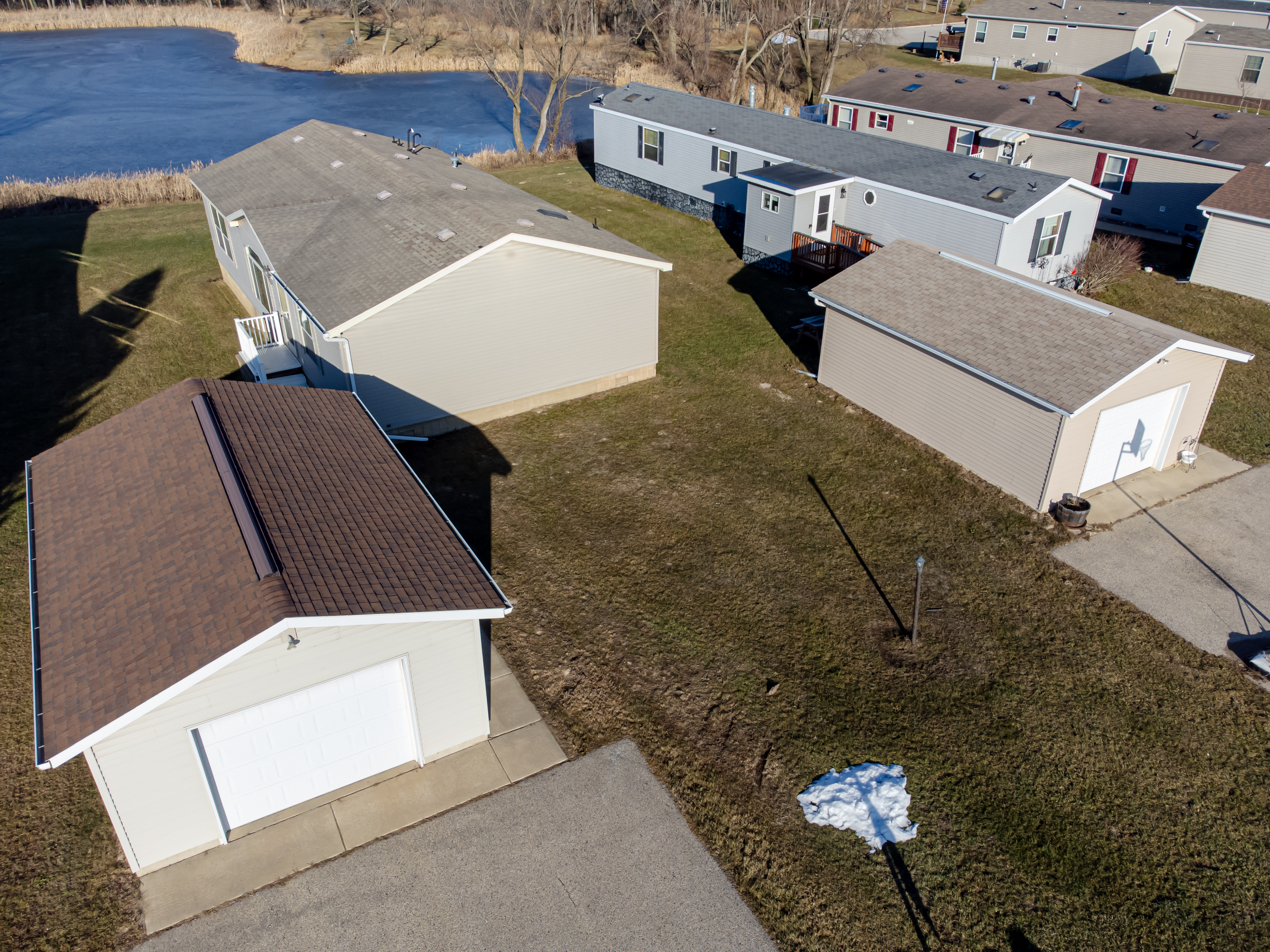
Mobile homes with detached single car garages in Tomah, Wisconsin, USA.

A mobile home (also known as a house trailer, park home, trailer, or trailer home) is a prefabricated structure, built in a factory on a permanently attached chassis before being transported to site (either by being towed or on a trailer). Used as permanent homes, or for holiday or temporary accommodation, they are often left permanently or semi-permanently in one place, but can be moved, and may be required to move from time to time for legal reasons.

Mobile homes share the same historic origins as travel trailers, but today the two are very different, with travel trailers being used primarily as temporary or vacation homes. Behind the cosmetic work fitted at installation to hide the base, mobile homes have strong trailer frames, axles, wheels, and tow-hitches.

== History ==
In the United States, this form of housing goes back to the early years of cars and motorized highway travel. It was derived from the travel trailer (often referred to during the early years as "house trailers" or "trailer coaches"), a small unit with wheels attached permanently, often used for camping or extended travel. The original rationale for this type of housing was its mobility. Units were initially marketed primarily to people whose lifestyle required mobility. However, in the 1950s, the homes began to be marketed primarily as an inexpensive form of housing designed to be set up and left in a location for long periods of time or even permanently installed with a masonry foundation. Previously, units had been eight feet or fewer in width, but in 1956, the 10-foot (3.0 m) wide home ("ten-wide") was introduced, along with the new term "mobile home".

The homes were given a rectangular shape, made from pre-painted aluminum panels, rather than the streamlined shape of travel trailers, which were usually painted after assembly. All of this helped increase the difference between these homes and home/travel trailers. The smaller, "eight-wide" units could be moved simply with a car, but the larger, wider units ("ten-wide", and, later, "twelve-wide") usually required the services of a professional trucking company, and, often, a special moving permit from a state highway department. During the late 1960s and early 1970s, the homes were made even longer and wider, making the mobility of the units more difficult. Nowadays, when a factory-built home is moved to a location, it is usually kept there permanently and the mobility of the units has considerably decreased. In some states, mobile homes have been taxed as personal property if the wheels remain attached, but as real estate if the wheels are removed. Removal of the tongue and axles may also be a requirement for real estate classification.

=== Manufactured home ===
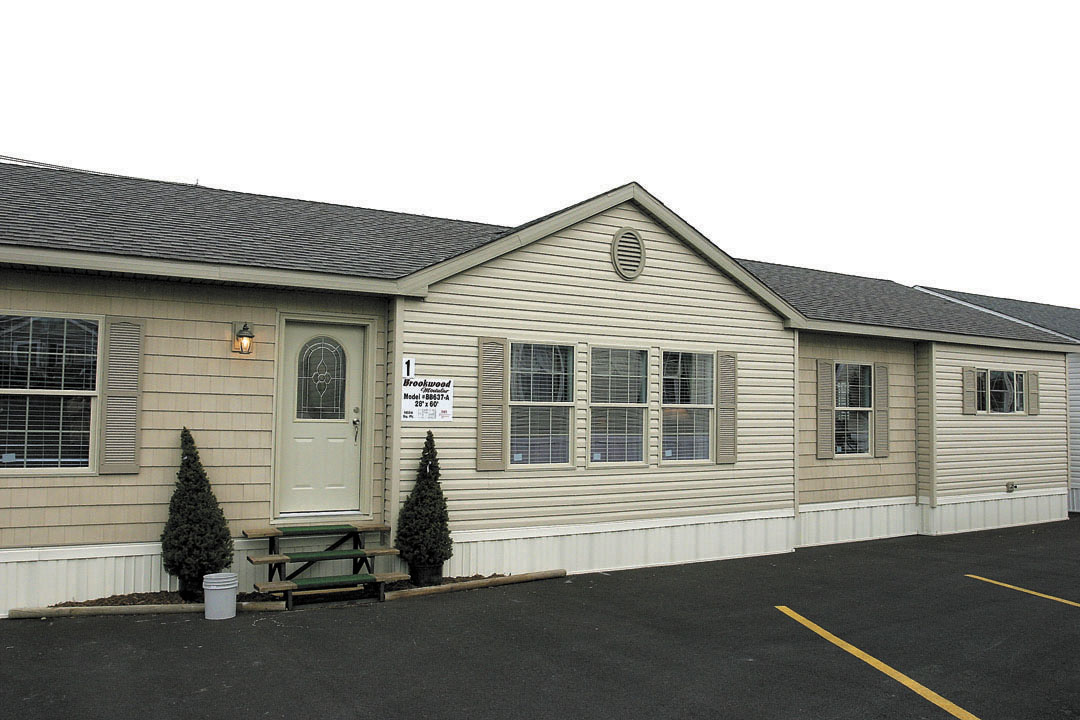
Example of a modern manufactured home in New Alexandria, Pennsylvania. 28 by 60 feet (8.5 m × 18.3 m)

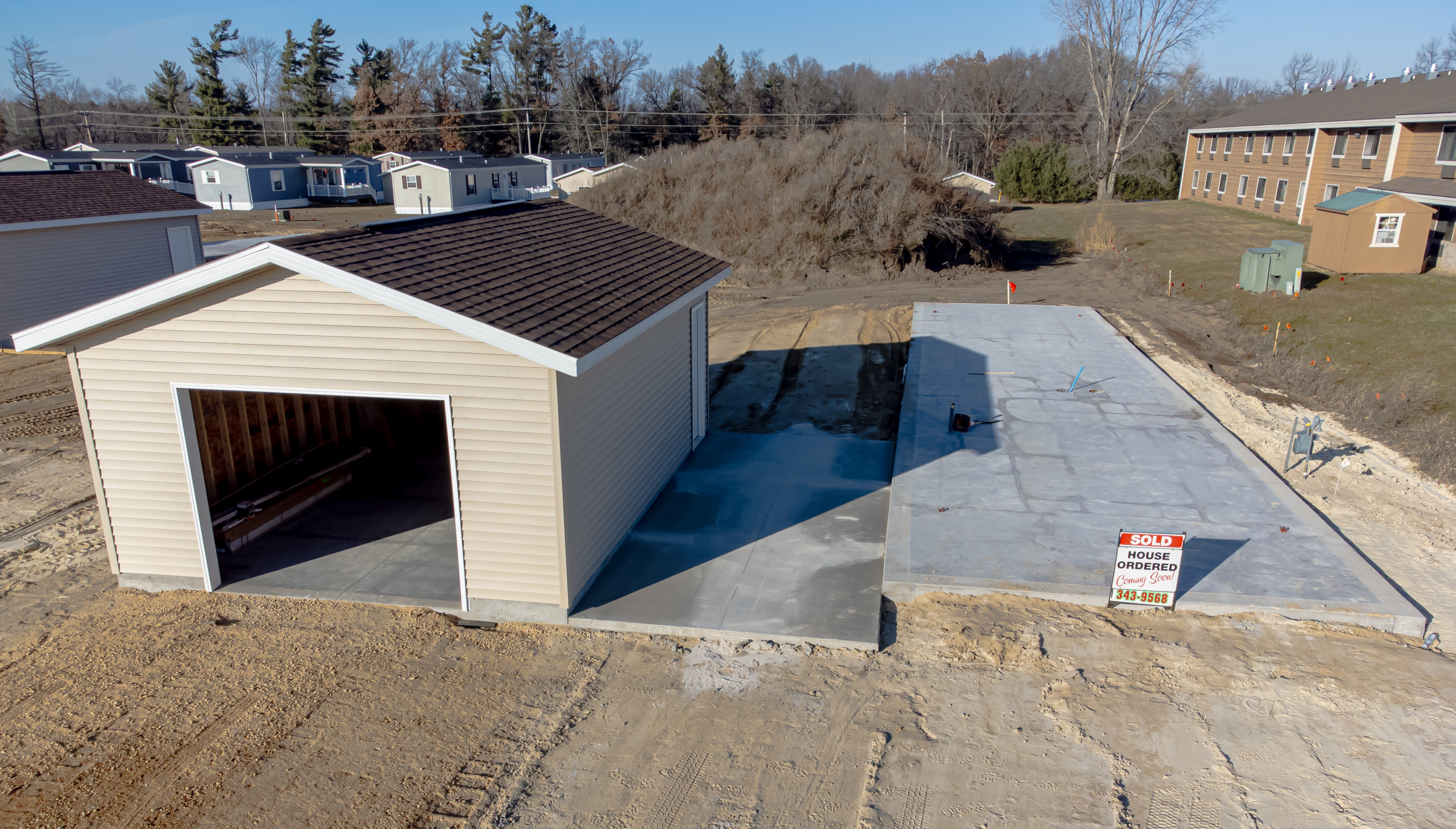
Manufactured home foundation

Mobile homes built in the United States since June 1976, legally referred to as manufactured homes, are required to meet Federal Housing Administration (FHA) certification requirements and come with attached metal certification tags. Mobile homes permanently installed on owned land are rarely mortgageable, whereas FHA code manufactured homes are mortgageable through the United States Department of Veterans Affairs (VA), FHA, and Fannie Mae.

Many people who could not afford a traditional site-built home, or did not desire to commit to spending a large sum of money on housing, began to see factory-built homes as a viable alternative for long-term housing needs. The units were often marketed as an alternative to apartment rental. However, the tendency of the units of this era to depreciate rapidly in resale value made using them as collateral for loans much riskier than traditional home loans. Terms were usually limited to less than the thirty-year term typical of the general home-loan market, and interest rates were considerably higher. In that way, mobile home loans resembled motor vehicle loans more than traditional home mortgage loans.

== Construction and sizes ==
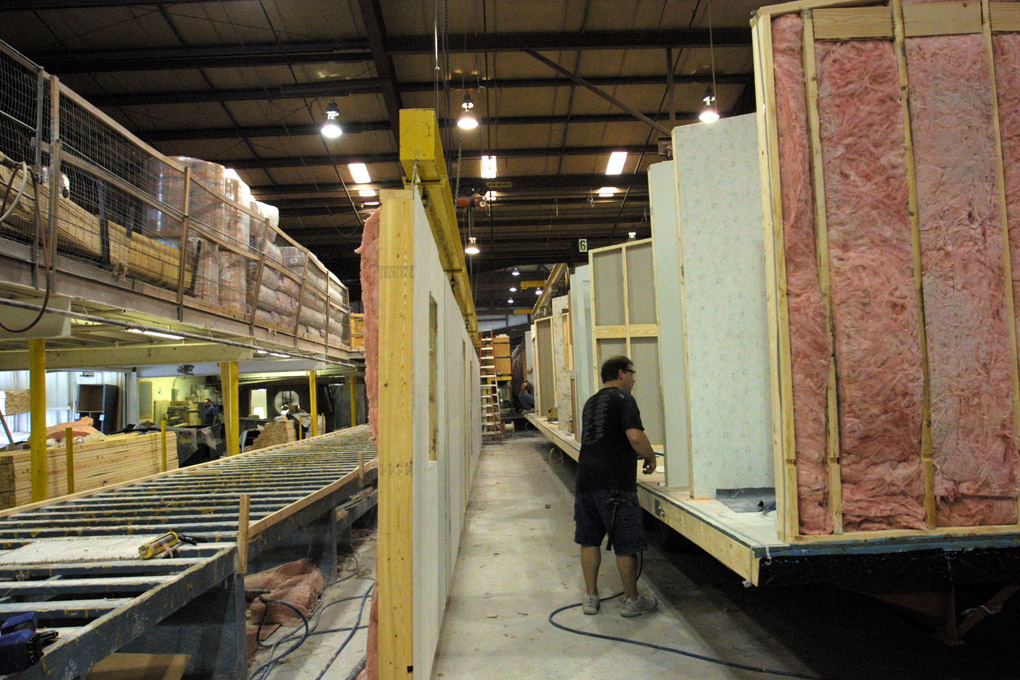
Exterior wall assemblies being set in place during manufacture

Mobile homes come in two major sizes, single-wides and double-wides. Single-wides are 18 feet (5.5 m) or less in width and 90 feet (27 m) or less in length and can be towed to their site as a single unit. Double-wides are 20 feet (6.1 m) or more wide and are 90 feet (27 m) in length or less and are towed to their site in two separate units, which are then joined. Triple-wides and even homes with four, five, or more units are also built but less frequently.

While site-built homes are rarely moved, single-wide owners often "trade" or sell their home to a dealer in the form of the reduction of the purchase of a new home. These "used" homes are either re-sold to new owners or to park owners who use them as inexpensive rental units. Single-wides are more likely to be traded than double-wides because removing them from the site is easier. In fact, only about 5% of all double-wides will ever be moved.

== Regulations ==
=== United States ===
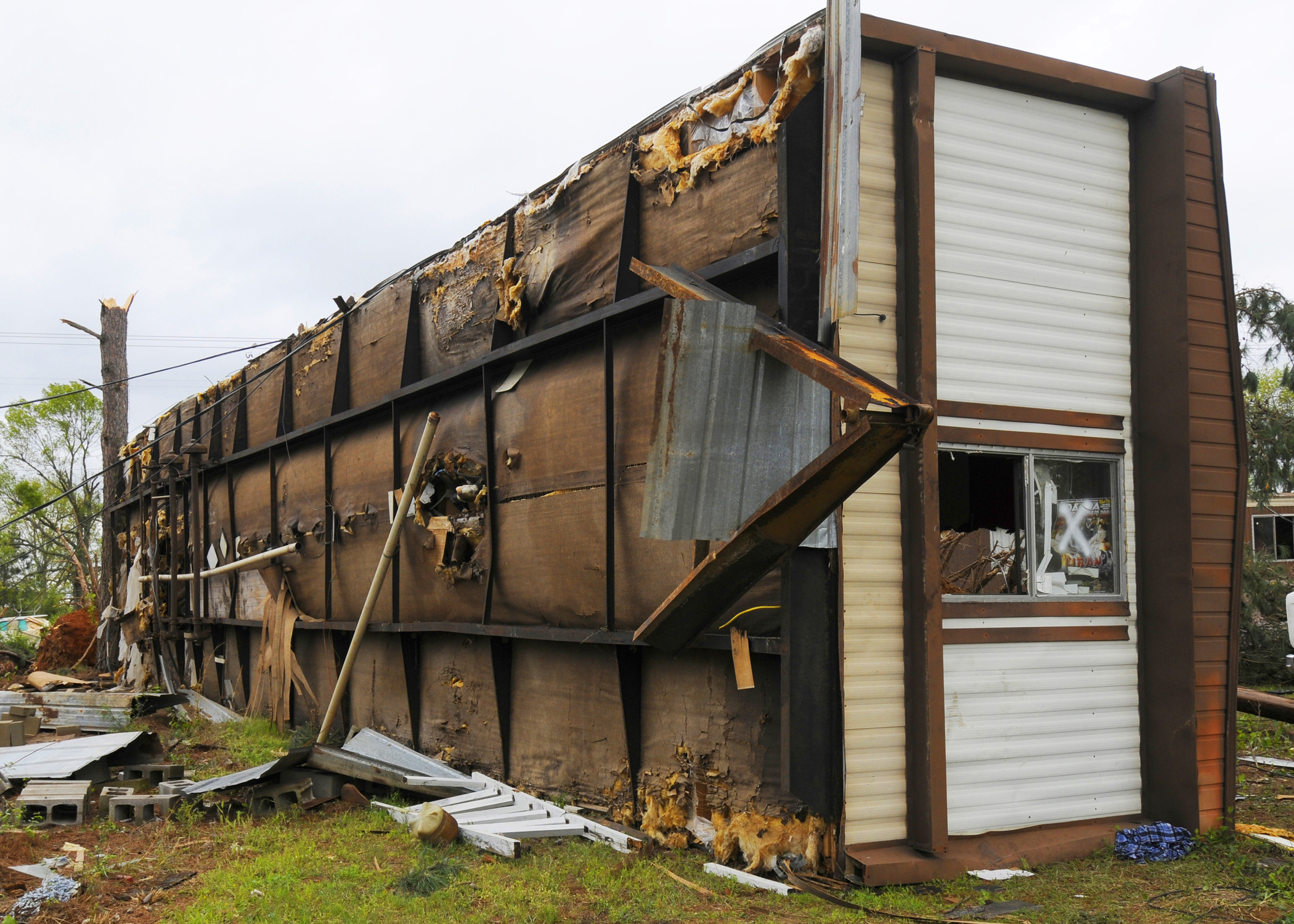
Home struck by tornado

In the United States, mobile homes are regulated by the US Department of Housing and Urban Development (HUD), via the Federal National Manufactured Housing Construction and Safety Standards Act of 1974. This national regulation has allowed many manufacturers to distribute nationwide because they are immune to the jurisdiction of local building authorities. By contrast, producers of modular homes must abide by state and local building codes. There are, however, wind zones adopted by HUD that home builders must follow. For example, statewide, Florida is at least wind zone 2. South Florida is wind zone 3, the strongest wind zone. After Hurricane Andrew in 1992, new standards were adopted for home construction. The codes for building within these wind zones were significantly amended, which has greatly increased their durability. During the 2004 hurricanes in Florida, these standards were put to the test, with great success. Yet, older models continue to face the exposed risk to high winds because of the attachments applied such as carports, porch and screen room additions. Such areas are exposed to "wind capture" which apply extreme force to the underside of the integrated roof panel systems, ripping the fasteners through the roof pan causing a series of events which destroys the main roof system and the home.

The popularity of the factory-built homes caused complications the legal system was not prepared to handle. Originally, factory-built homes tended to be taxed as vehicles rather than real estate, which resulted in very low property tax rates for their inhabitants. That caused local governments to reclassify them for taxation purposes.

However, even with that change, rapid depreciation often resulted in the home occupants paying far less in property taxes than had been anticipated and budgeted. The ability to move many factory-built homes rapidly into a relatively small area resulted in strains to the infrastructure and governmental services of the affected areas, such as inadequate water pressure and sewage disposal, and highway congestion. That led jurisdictions to begin placing limitations on the size and density of developments.

Early homes, even those that were well-maintained, tended to depreciate over time, much like motor vehicles. That is in contrast to site-built homes which include the land they are built on and tend to appreciate in value. The arrival of mobile homes in an area tended to be regarded with alarm, in part because of the devaluation of the housing potentially spreading to preexisting structures.

This combination of factors has caused most jurisdictions to place zoning regulations on the areas in which factory-built homes are placed, and limitations on the number and density of homes permitted on any given site. Other restrictions, such as minimum size requirements, limitations on exterior colors and finishes, and foundation mandates have also been enacted. There are many jurisdictions that will not allow the placement of any additional factory-built homes. Others have strongly limited or forbidden all single-wide models, which tend to depreciate more rapidly than modern double-wide models.

Apart from all the practical issues described above, there is also the constant discussion about legal fixture and chattels and so the legal status of a trailer is or could be affected by its incorporation to the land or not. This sometimes involves such factors as whether or not the wheels have been removed.

==== North Carolina ====
The North Carolina Board of Transportation allowed 14-foot-wide homes on the state's roads, but until January 1997, 16-foot-wide homes were not allowed. 41 states allowed 16-foot-wide homes, but they were not sold in North Carolina. Under a trial program approved January 10, 1997, the wider homes could be delivered on specific roads at certain times of day and travel 10 mph below the speed limit, with escort vehicles in front and behind. Eventually, all homes had to leave the state on interstate highways.

In December 1997, a study showed that the wider homes could be delivered safely, but some opponents still wanted the program to end. On December 2, 1999, the NC Manufactured Housing Institute asked the state Board of Transportation to expand the program to allow deliveries of 16-foot-wide homes within North Carolina. A month later, the board extended the pilot program by three months but did not vote to allow shipments within the state. In June 2000, the board voted to allow 16-foot-side homes to be shipped to other states on more two-lane roads, and to allow shipments in the state east of US 220. A third escort was required, including a law enforcement officer on two-lane roads.

==== New York ====
In New York State, the Homes and Community Renewal agency tracks mobile home parks and provides regulations concerning them. For example, the agency requires park owners to provide residents with a $15,000 grant if residents are forced to move when the land is transferred to a new owner. Residents are also granted the right of first refusal for a sale of the park, however, if the owner does not evict tenants for five years, the land sale can go ahead. State law also restricts the annual increase in land lot fee to a cap of 3 percent, unless the landowner demonstrates hardship in a local court, and can then raise the land lot fee by up to 6 percent in a year.

== Mobile home parks ==
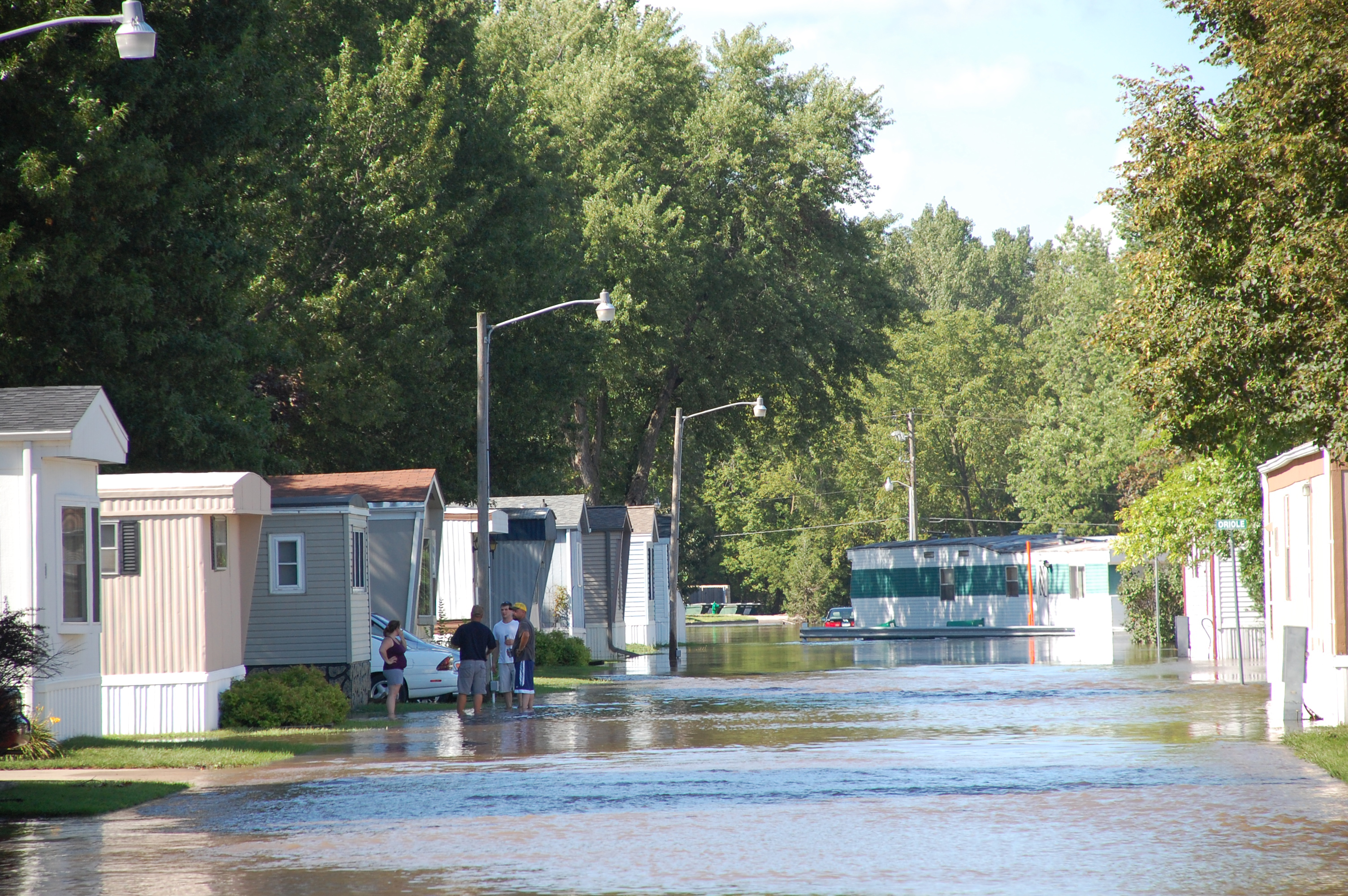
Meadow Lanes Estates Mobile Home Park, Ames, Iowa, August 2010, during a flood

Mobile homes are often sited in land lease communities known as trailer parks (also 'trailer courts', 'mobile home parks', 'mobile home communities', 'manufactured home communities', 'factory-built home communities' etc.); these communities allow homeowners to rent space on which to place a home. In addition to providing space, the site often provides basic utilities such as water, sewer, electricity, or natural gas and other amenities such as mowing, garbage removal, community rooms, pools, and playgrounds.

There are over 38,000 trailer parks in the United States ranging in size from 5 to over 1,000 home sites. Although most parks appeal to meeting basic housing needs, some communities specialize towards certain segments of the market. One subset of mobile home parks, retirement communities, restrict residents to those age 55 and older. Another subset of mobile home parks, seasonal communities, are located in popular vacation destinations or are used as a location for summer homes. In New York State, as of 2019, there were 1,811 parks with 83,929 homes.

Newer homes, particularly double-wides, tend to be built to much higher standards than their predecessors and meet the building codes applicable to most areas. That has led to a reduction in the rate of value depreciation of most used units.

Additionally, modern homes tend to be built from materials similar to those used in site-built homes rather than inferior, lighter-weight materials. They are also more likely to physically resemble site-built homes. Often, the primary differentiation in appearance is that factory-built homes tend to have less of a roof slope so that they can be readily transported underneath bridges and overpasses.

The number of double-wide units sold exceeds the number of single-wides, which is due in part to the aforementioned zoning restrictions. Another reason for higher sales is the spaciousness of double-wide units, which are now comparable to site-built homes. Single-wide units are still popular primarily in rural areas, where there are fewer restrictions. They are frequently used as temporary housing in areas affected by natural disasters when restrictions are temporarily waived.

Another recent trend has been parks in which the owner of the mobile home owns the lot on which their unit is parked. Some of these communities simply provide land in a homogeneous neighborhood, but others are operated more like condominiums with club homes complete with swimming pools and meeting rooms which are shared by all of the residents, who are required to pay membership fees and dues.

== By country ==
'Mobile home' is used in many European campgrounds to refer to fixed caravans, purpose-built cabins, and even large tents, which are rented by the week or even year-round as cheap accommodation, similar to the US concept of a trailer park. Like many other US loanwords, the term is not used widely in Britain.

=== United Kingdom ===
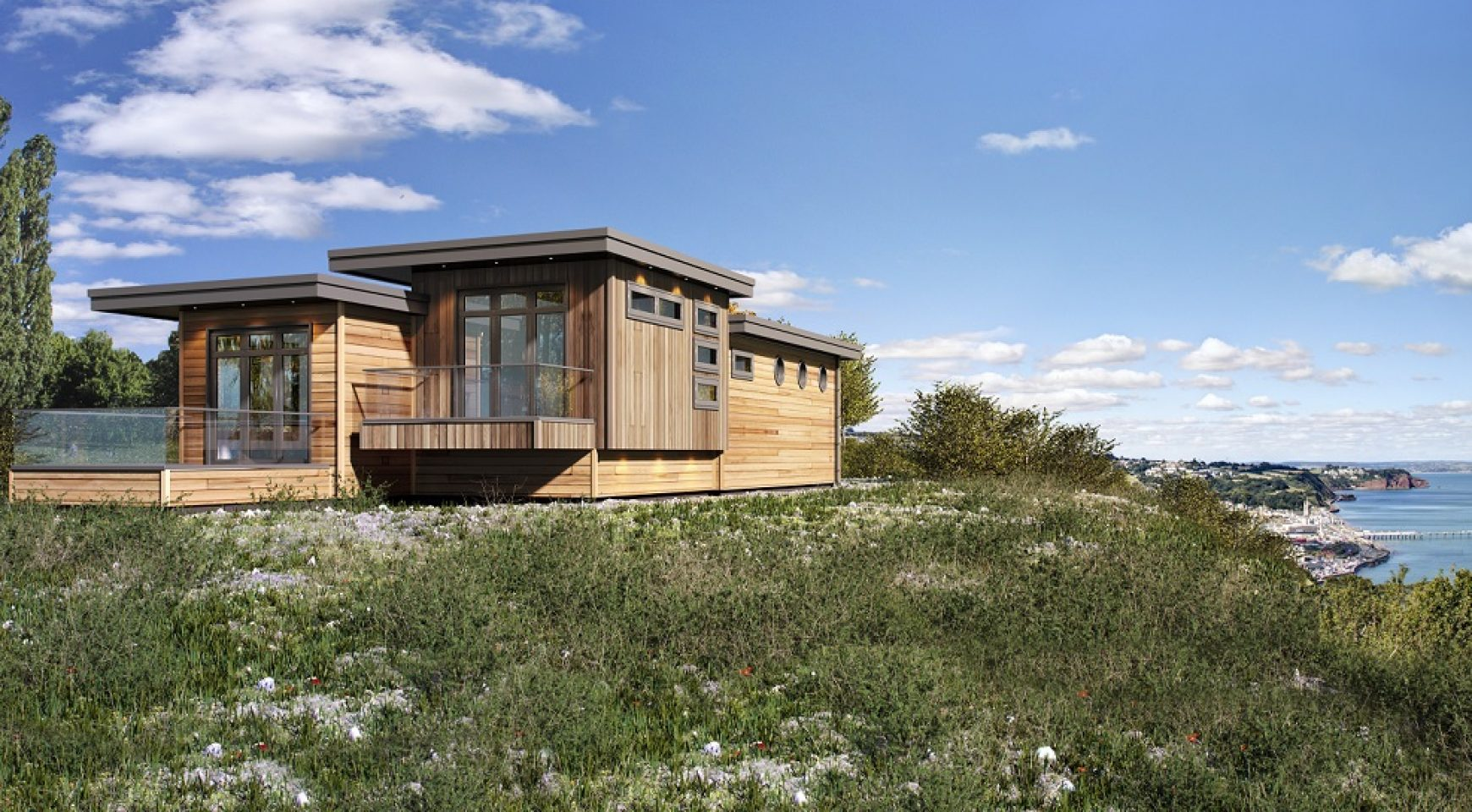
A mobile home marketed as a holiday home

Mobile homes, or static caravans, are popular across the United Kingdom. They are more commonly referred to as park homes or leisure lodges, depending on whether they are marketed as a residential dwelling or as a second holiday home residence.

Residential mobile homes (park homes) are built to the BS3632 standard. This standard is issued by the British Standards Institution. The majority of residential parks in the UK have a minimum age limit for their residents, and are generally marketed as retirement or semi-retirement parks. Holiday homes, static caravans or holiday lodges are not required to be built to BS3632 standards, but many are built to the standard.

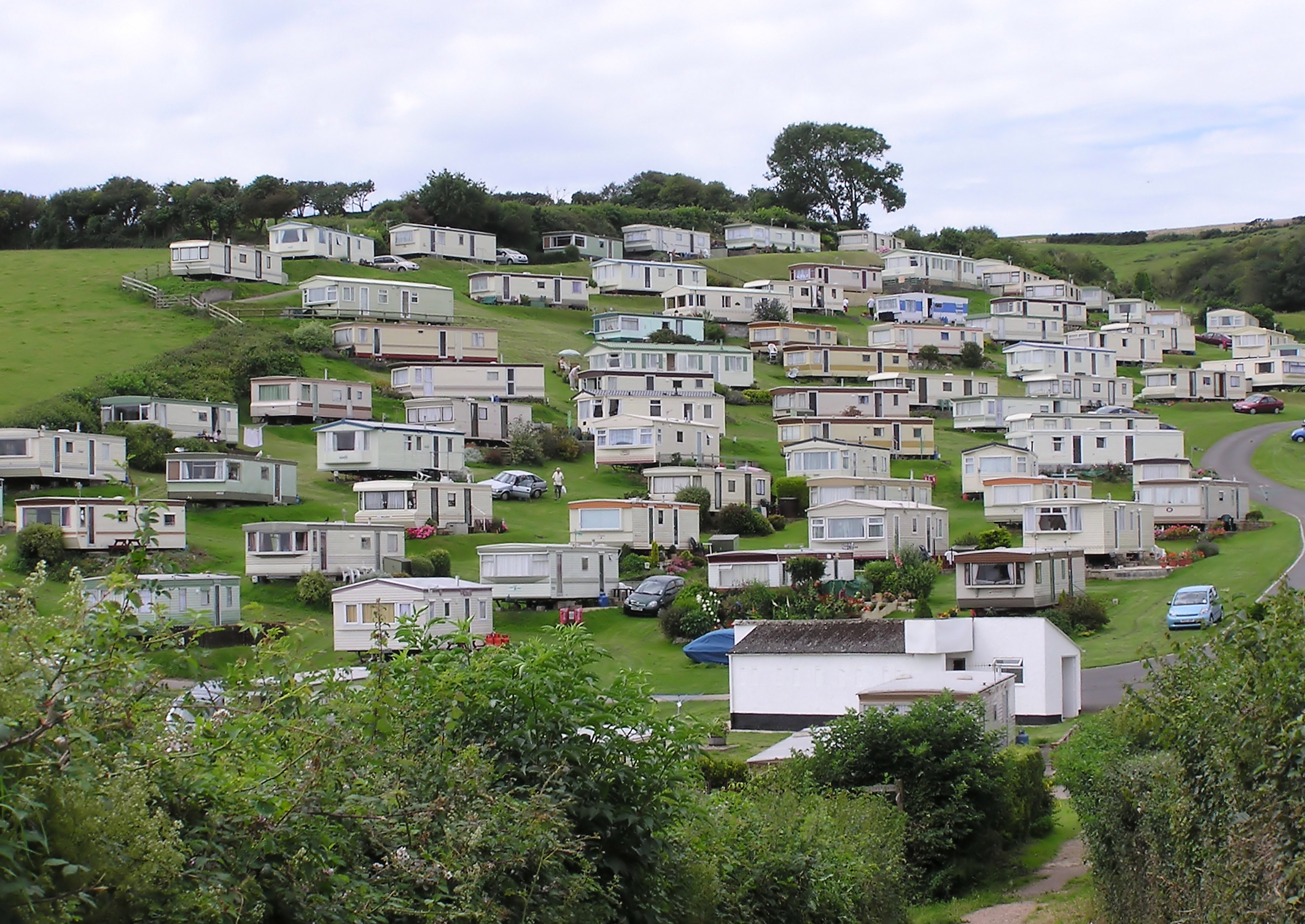
A static caravan park on the cliffs above Beer, Devon, England

In addition to mobile homes, static caravans are popular across the UK. Static caravans have wheels and a rudimentary chassis with no suspension or brakes and are therefore transported on the back of large flatbed lorries, the axle and wheels being used for movement to the final location when the static caravan is moved by tractor or 4×4. A static caravan normally stays on a single plot for many years and has many of the modern conveniences normally found in a home.

Mobile homes are designed and constructed to be transportable by road in one or two sections. Mobile homes are no larger than 20 m × 6.8 m (65 ft 7 in × 22 ft 4 in) with an internal maximum height of 3.05 m (10 ft 0 in). A caravan with a maximum authorised mass of more than 3,500 kg (7,700 lb) cannot legally be towed by an ordinary towing car with a category BE licence unless the driver qualified before 19 January 2013; one more than 2.55 metres (8 ft 4 in) wide or 18.65 metres (61.2 ft) long also requires notification to police as an abnormal load and may need to be escorted. Usually, they are transported on flatbeds or low loaders by specialised haulage firms.

Static holiday caravans generally have sleeping accommodation for 6 to 10 people in 2, 3 or 4 bedrooms and on convertible seating in the lounge referred to as a 'pull out bed'. They tend towards a fairly "open-plan" layout, and while some units are double glazed and centrally heated for year-round use, cheaper models without double glazing or central heating are available for mainly summer use. Static caravan holiday homes are intended for leisure use and are available in 10 and 12 ft (3.0 and 3.7 m) widths, a small number in 13 and 14 ft (4.0 and 4.3 m) widths, and a few 16 ft (4.9 m) wide, consisting of two 8 ft (2.4 m) wide units joined. Generally, holiday homes are clad in painted steel panels, but can be clad in PVC, timber or composite materials. Static caravans are sited on caravan parks where the park operator of the site leases a plot to the caravan owner. There are many holiday parks in the UK in which one's own static caravan can be owned. There are a few of these parks in areas that are prone to flooding and anyone considering buying a sited static caravan needs to take particular care in checking that their site is not liable to flooding.

Static caravans can be rented on an ad-hoc basis or purchased. Purchase prices range from £25,000 to £100,000. Once purchased, static caravans have various ongoing costs including insurance, site fees, local authority rates, utility charges, winterisation and depreciation. Depending on the type of caravan and the park these costs can range from £1,000 to £40,000 per year. Some park owners used to have unfair conditions in their lease contracts but the Office of Fair Trading has produced a guidance document available for download called Unfair Terms in Holiday Caravan Agreements which aims to stop unfair practices.

=== Israel ===
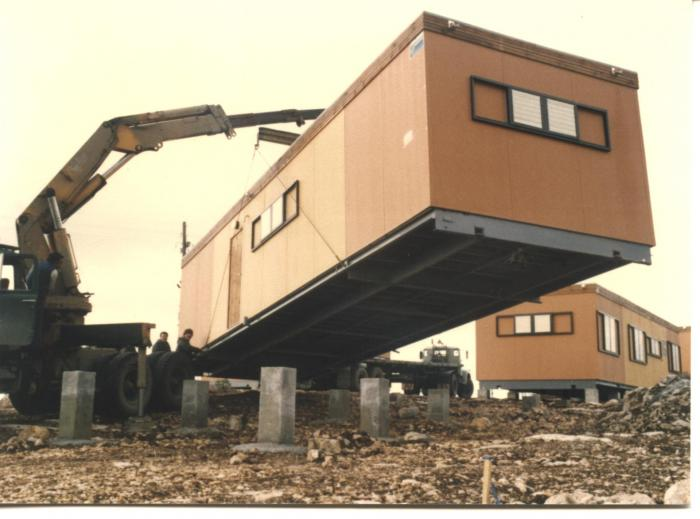
Posting of caravan in Mitzpe Hila, Israel, 1982

Many Israeli settlements and outposts are originally composed of caravans (Hebrew: קראוואן caravan; pl. קראוואנים, caravanim). They are constructed of light metal, are not insulated but can be outfitted with heating and air-conditioning units, water lines, recessed lighting, and floor tiling to function in a full-service capacity. Starting in 2005, prefabricated homes, named caravillas (Hebrew: קרווילה), a portmanteau of the words caravan, and villa, begin to replace mobile homes in many Israeli settlements.

== Difference from modular homes ==
Because of similarities in the manufacturing process, some companies build both types in their factories. Modular homes are transported on flatbed trucks rather than being towed, and lack axles and an automotive-type frame. However, some modular homes are towed behind a semi-truck or toter on a frame similar to that of a trailer. The home is usually in two pieces and is hauled by two separate trucks. Each frame has five or more axles, depending on the size of the home. Once the home has reached its location, the axles and the tongue of the frame are then removed, and the home is set on a concrete foundation by a large crane.

Both styles are commonly referred to as factory-built housing, but that term's technical use is restricted to a class of homes regulated by the Federal National Mfd. Housing Construction and Safety Standards Act of 1974.

Most zoning restrictions on the homes have been found to be inapplicable or only applicable to modular homes. That occurs often after considerable litigation on the topic by affected jurisdictions and by plaintiffs failing to ascertain the difference. Most modern modulars, once fully assembled, are indistinguishable from site-built homes. Their roofs are usually transported as separate units. Newer modulars also come with roofs that can be raised during the setting process with cranes. There are also modulars with 2 to 4 storeys.

== Gallery ==
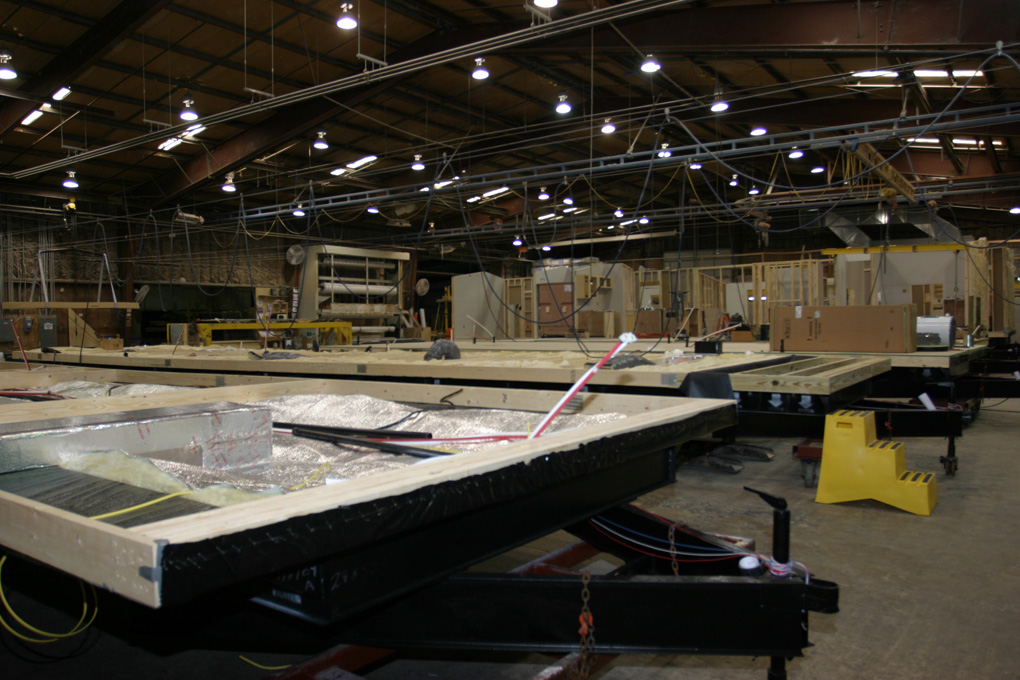
Construction starts with the frame.

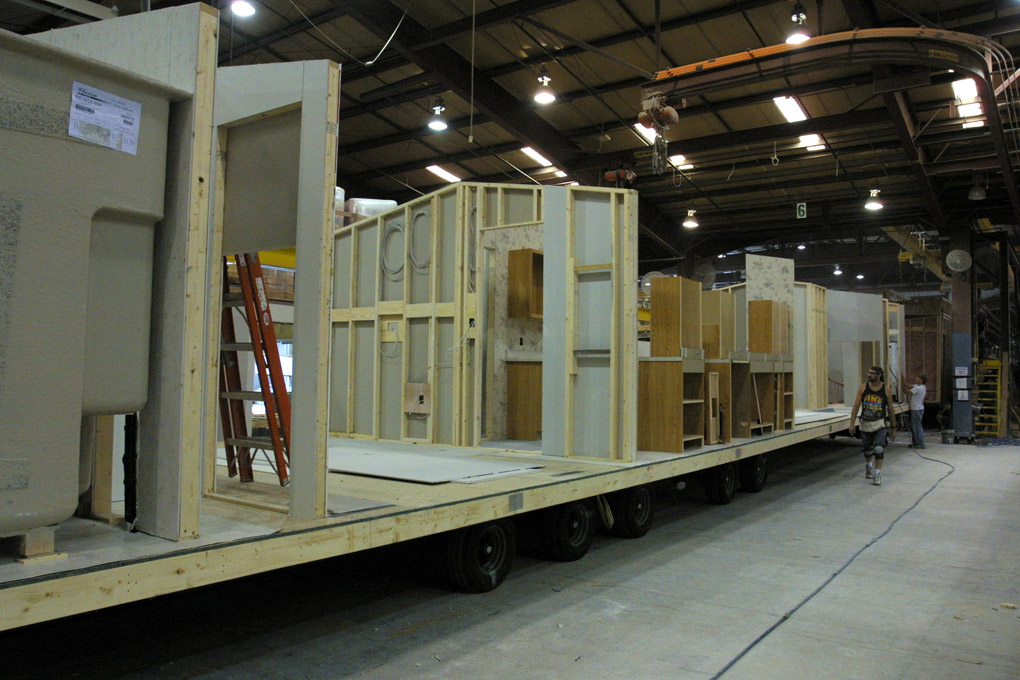
Interior wall assemblies are attached.

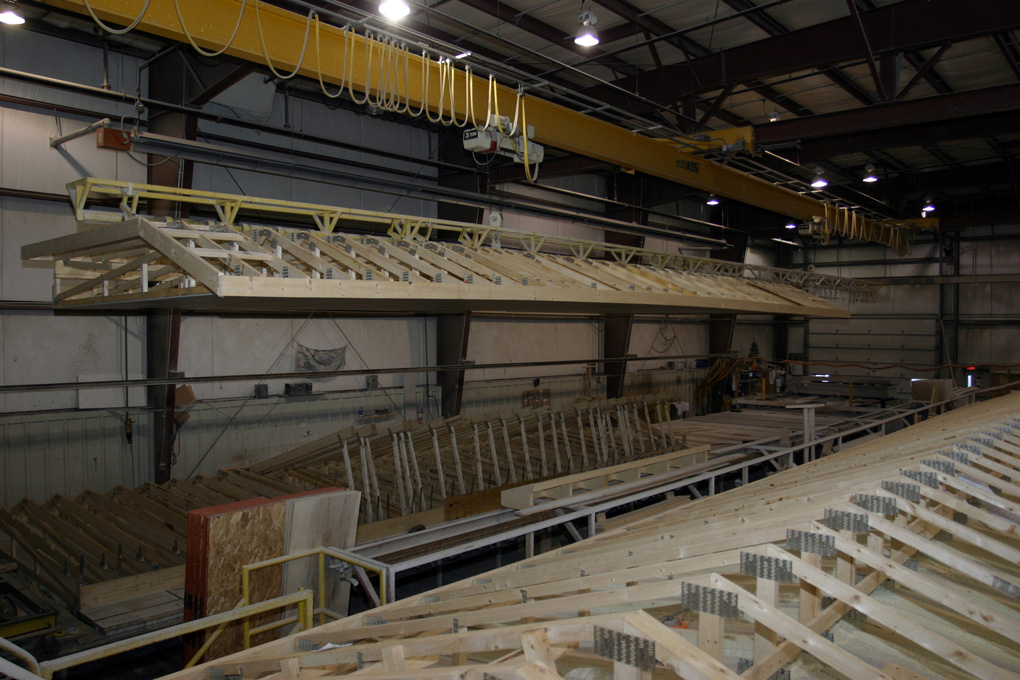
Roof assembly is set atop home.

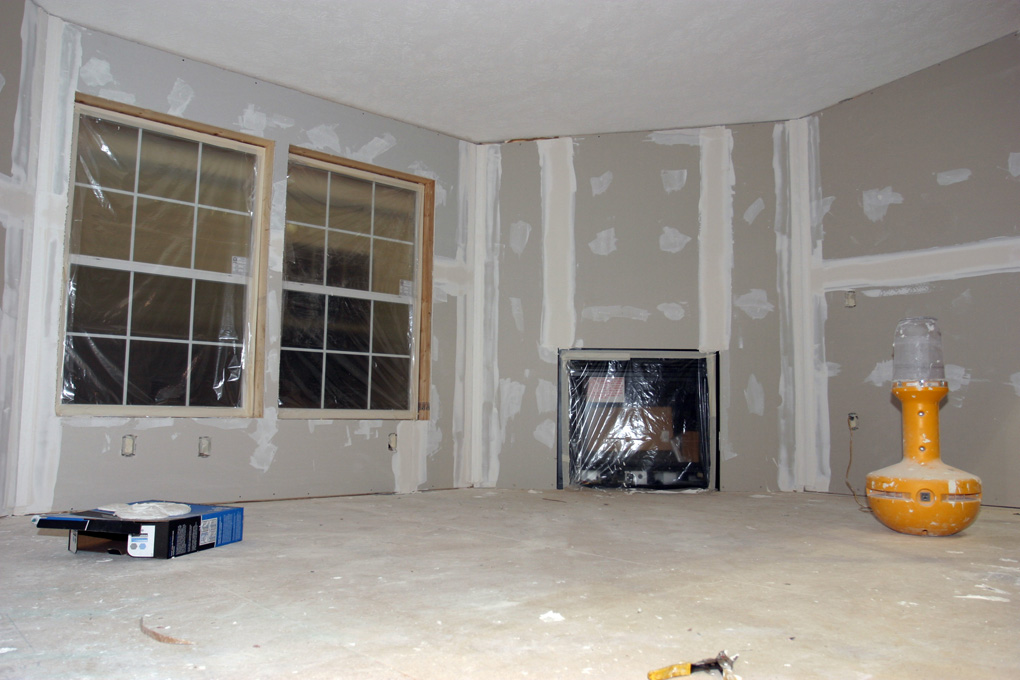
Drywall is completed.

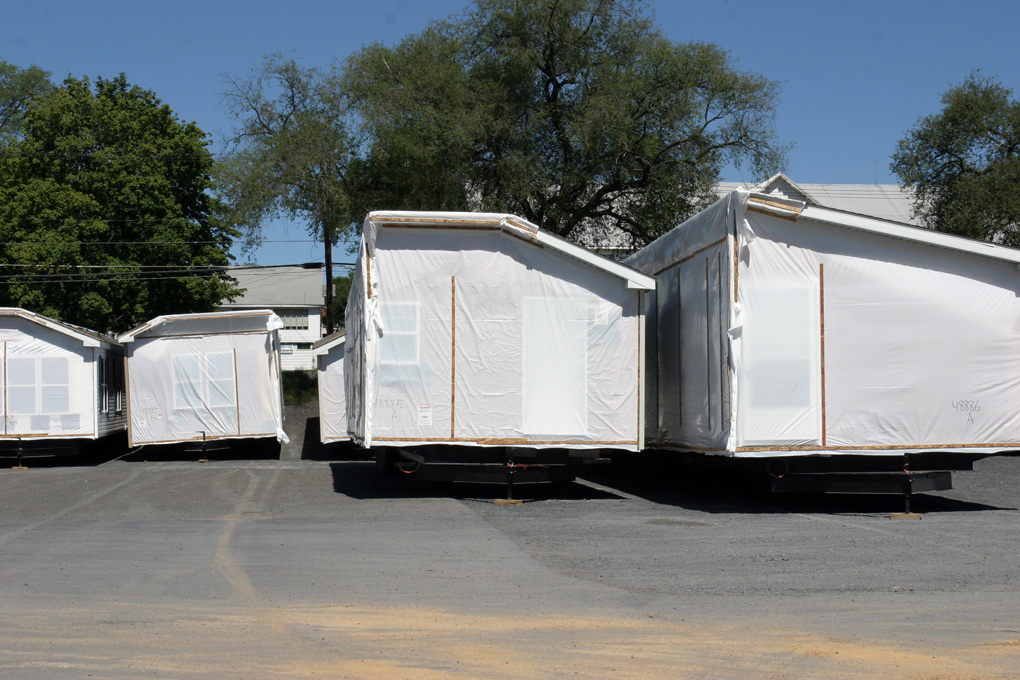
Home is ready for delivery to site.

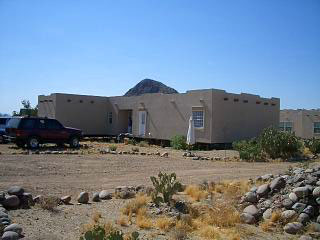
A modern "triple wide" home, designed to look like an adobe home

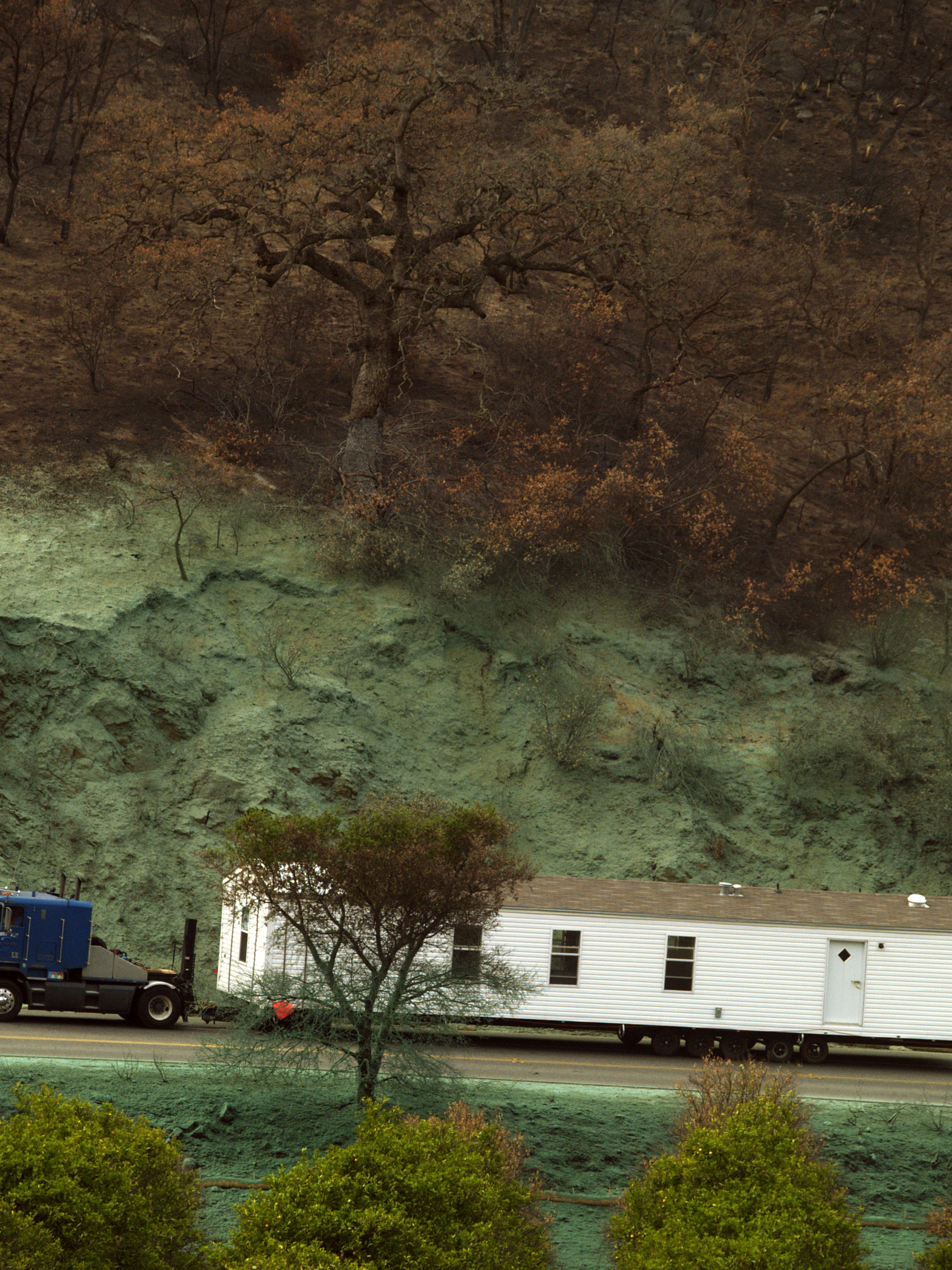
A mobile home is being moved, California.

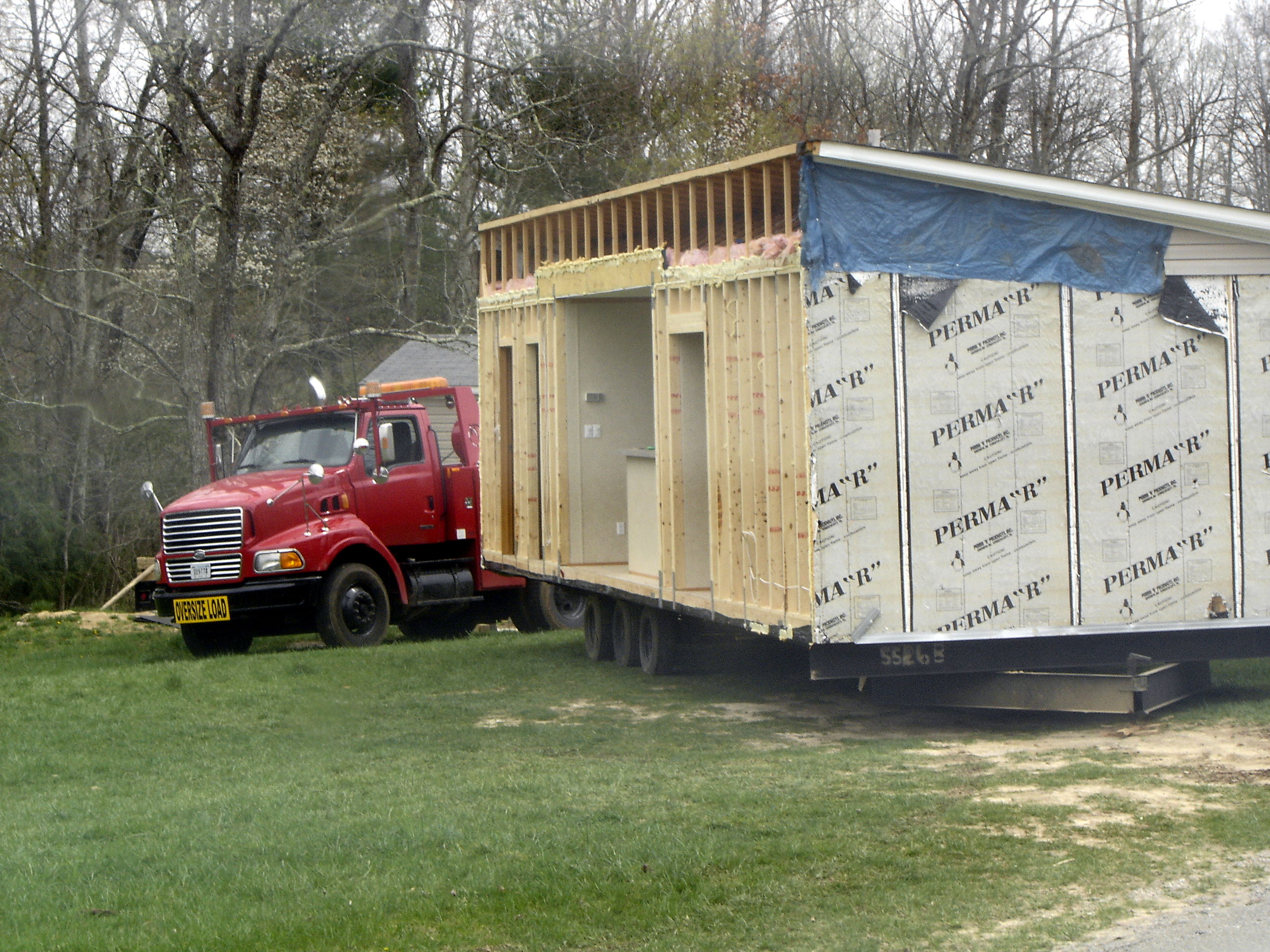
A mobile home being prepared for transport

== See also ==
- All Parks Alliance for Change
- Campervan
- Construction trailer
- Houseboat
- Manufactured housing
- Modular home
- Motorhome
- Nomadic wagons
- Recreational vehicle
- Reefer container housing units
- Small house movement
- Trailer (vehicle)
- Trailer Park Boys
- Trailer trash
- Vardo
- Prefabricated home
