= Manufactured housing =

Type of prefabricated housing

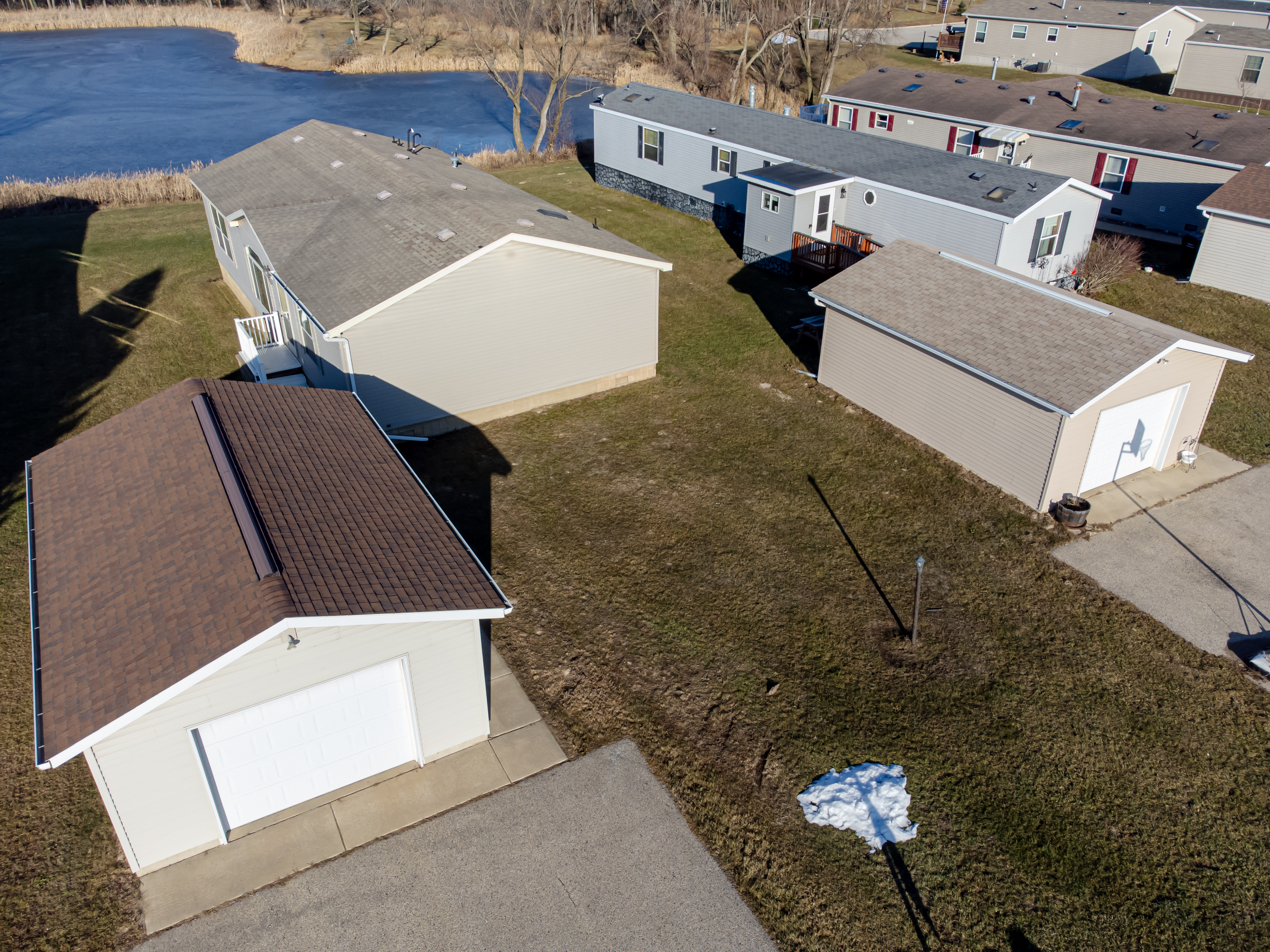
Manufactured homes with garage

Manufactured housing (commonly known as mobile homes in the United States) is a type of prefabricated housing that is largely assembled in factories and then transported to sites of use. The definition of the term in the United States is regulated by federal law (Code of Federal Regulations, 24 CFR 3280): "Manufactured homes are built as dwelling units of at least 320 square feet (30 m^{2}) in size with a permanent chassis to assure the initial and continued transportability of the home." The requirement to have a wheeled chassis permanently attached differentiates "manufactured housing" from other types of prefabricated homes, such as modular homes.

== United States ==
=== Definition ===
According to the Manufactured Housing Institute's National Communities Council (MHINCC), manufactured homes

are homes built entirely in the factory under a federal building code administered by the U.S. Department of Housing and Urban Development (HUD). The Federal Manufactured Home Construction and Safety Standards (commonly known as the HUD Code) went into effect June 15, 1976. Manufactured homes may be single- or multi-section and are transported to the site and installed.

The MHINCC distinguishes among several types of factory-built housing: manufactured homes, modular homes, panelized homes, pre-cut homes, and mobile homes.

From the same source, mobile home "is the term used for manufactured homes produced prior to June 15, 1976, when the HUD Code went into effect." Despite the formal definition, mobile home and trailer are still common terms in the United States for this type of housing.

=== History ===
The original focus of this form of housing was its ability to relocate easily. Units were initially marketed primarily to people whose lifestyle required mobility. However, beginning in the 1950s, these homes began to be marketed primarily as an inexpensive form of housing designed to be stationed in one location for long periods of time, or even permanently installed with a masonry foundation. Previously, units had been eight feet or less in width, but in 1956, the 10-foot (3.0 m) wide home was introduced. This helped solidify the line between mobile and house/travel trailers, since the smaller units could be moved with an automobile, while the larger units required the services of a professional trucking company. In the 1960s and 70s, mobile homes became even longer and wider, making units less transportable. Today, when a factory-built home is moved to a location, it is usually kept there permanently.

The factory-built homes of the past developed a negative stereotype because of their lower cost and the tendency for their value to depreciate more quickly than site-built homes. The tendency of these homes to rapidly depreciate in resale value made using them as collateral for loans far riskier than traditional home loans. Loan terms were usually limited to less than the 30-year term typical of the general home-loan market, and interest rates were considerably higher. In other words, these home loans resembled motor vehicle loans far more than traditional home mortgages. They have been consistently linked to lower-income families, which has led to prejudice and zoning restrictions, which include limitations on the number and density of homes permitted on any given site, minimum size requirements, limitations on exterior colors and finishes, and foundation mandates.

Many jurisdictions do not allow the placement of any additional factory-built homes, while others have strongly limited or forbidden all single-wide models, which tend to depreciate more rapidly than modern double-wide models. The derogatory concept of a "trailer park" is typically older single-wide homes occupying small, rented lots and remaining on wheels, even if the home stays in place for decades.

=== Modern manufactured homes ===
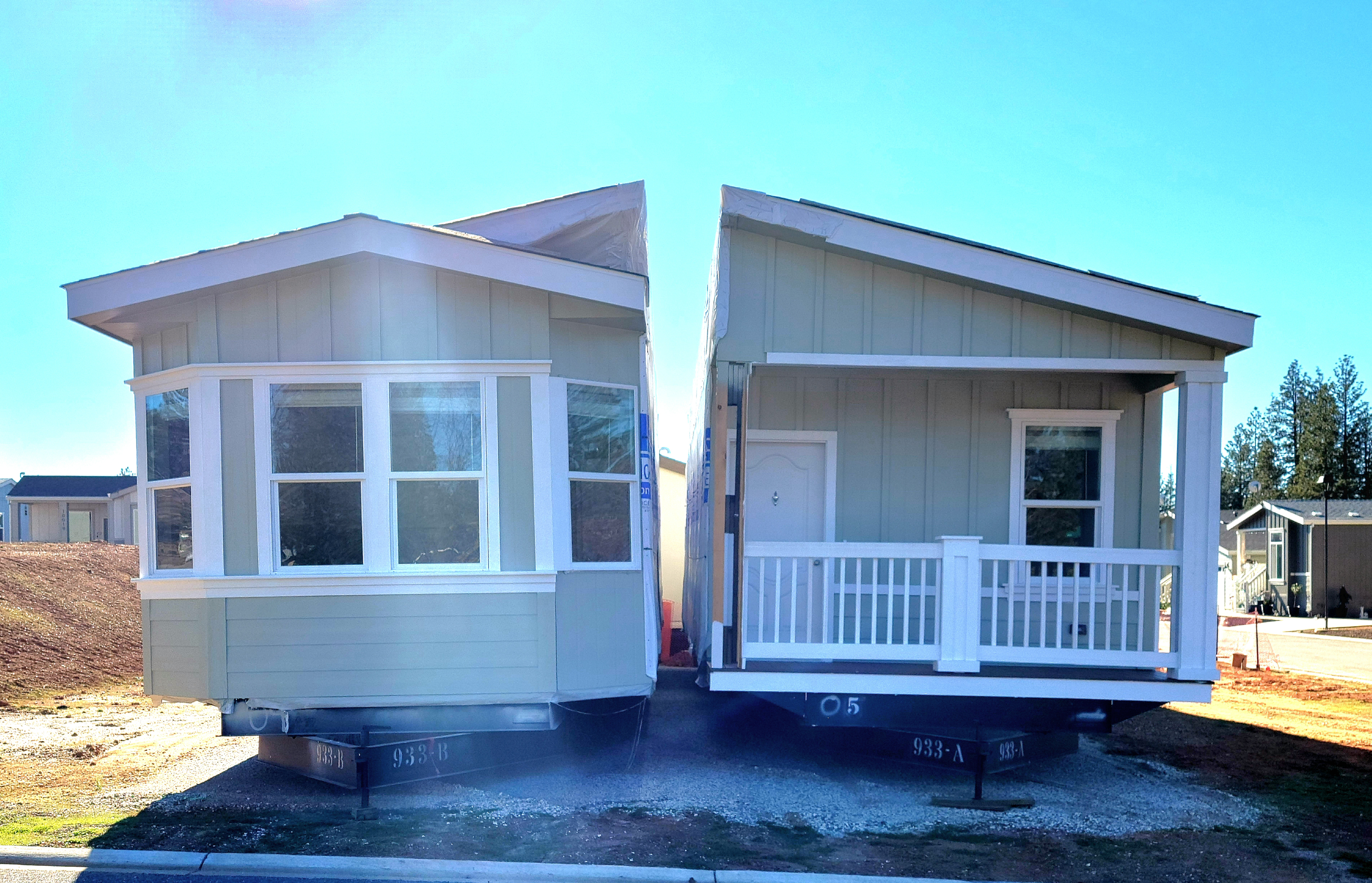
A manufactured house ready to be assembled in Grass Valley, California

Modern homes, especially modular homes, belie this image and can be identical in appearance to site-built homes. Newer homes, particularly double-wides, tend to be built to much higher standards than their predecessors. This has led to a reduction in the rate of value depreciation of many used units.

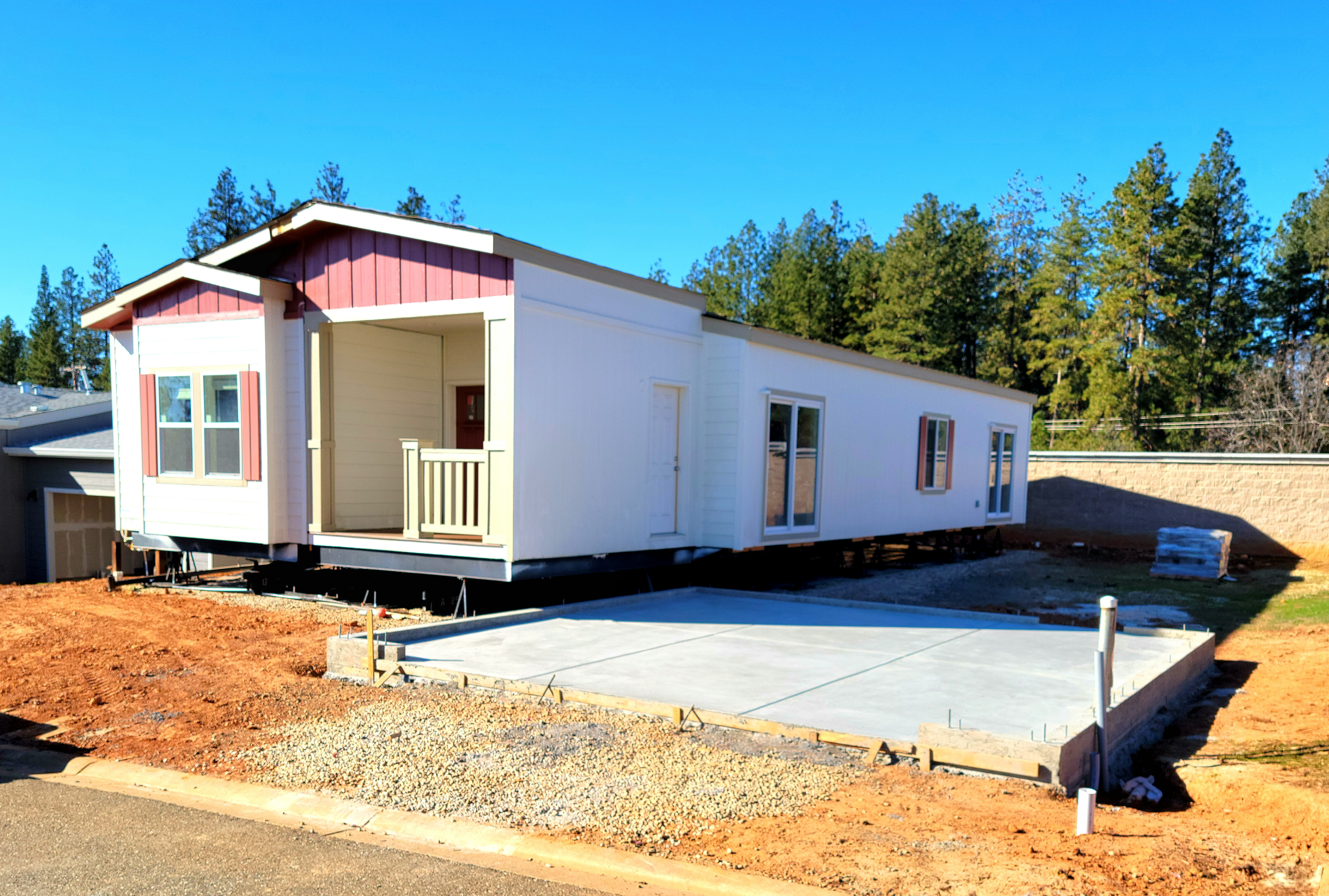
A manufactured house just before construction of its garage

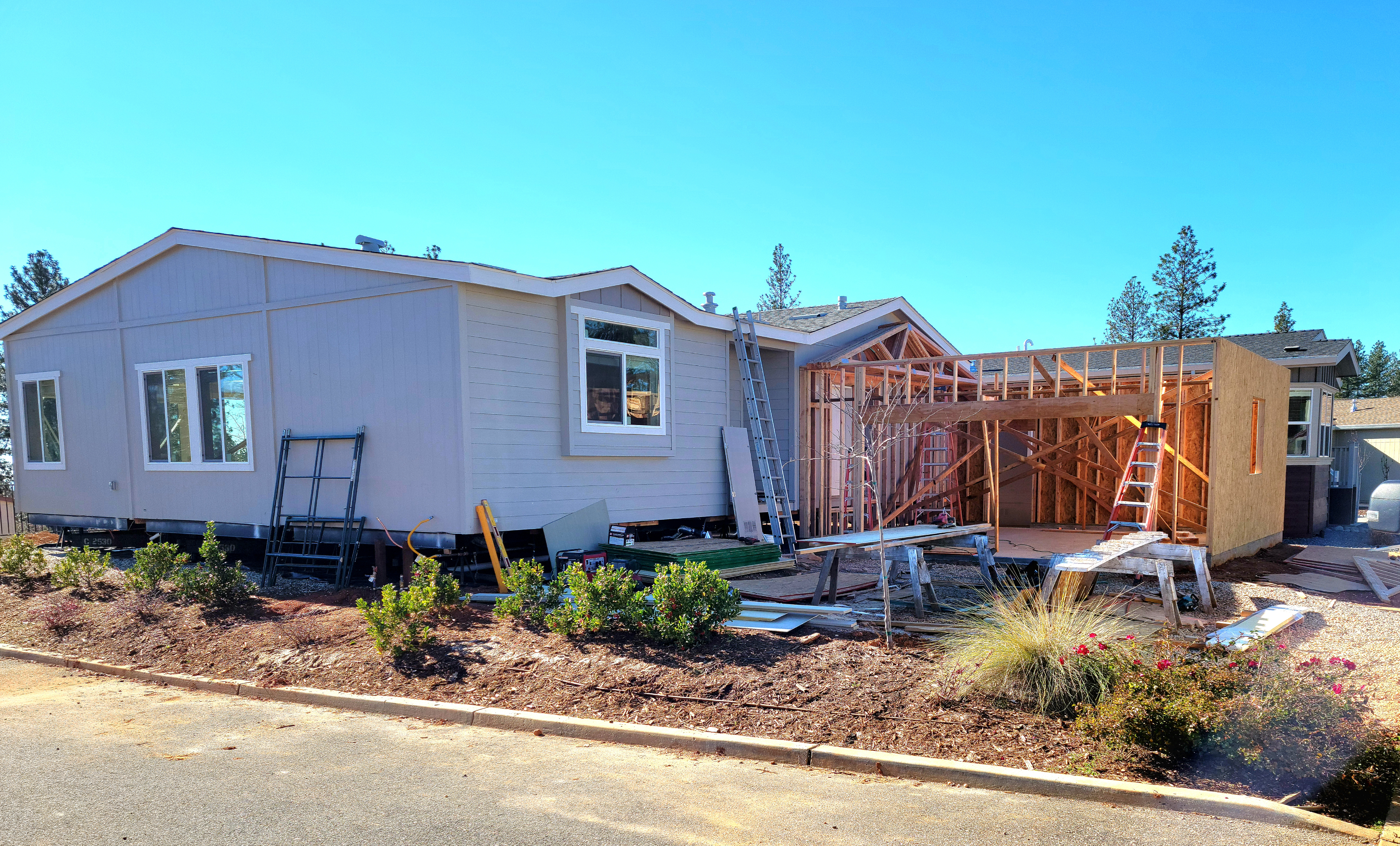
Stick built garage being added to a new manufactured house

Although great strides have been made in terms of quality, manufactured homes do still struggle with construction problems. Author Wes Johnson has pointed out that the HUD code which governs manufactured homes desperately needs to be updated, quality control at manufacturing facilities are often lax, and set-up issues often compromise even a well-made manufactured home. Johnson states buyers need to be exceptionally cautious if they are entertaining the idea of purchasing any manufactured home by carefully checking it for defects before signing the contract and supervising the set-up process closely. These homes in the modern age are built to be beautiful and last longer than the typical old trailers.

When FEMA studied the destruction wrought by Hurricane Andrew in Dade County Florida, they concluded that modular and masonry homes fared best compared to other construction.

=== High-performance manufactured housing ===
While manufactured homes are considered to be affordable housing, older models can be some of the most expensive in the nation to heat due to energy inefficiency. High-performance manufactured housing uses less energy and therefore increases life-cycle affordability by decreasing operating costs. High-performance housing is not only energy efficient, but also attractive, functional, water-efficient, resilient to wind, seismic forces, and moisture penetration, and has healthy indoor environmental quality. Achieving high-performance involves integrated, whole building design, involving many components, not one single technology. High–performance manufactured housing should also include energy efficient appliances, such as Energy Star qualified appliances. Energy Star requires ample insulation: 2x6 walls: R21, roof: R40, floor: R33.

=== Difference from modular homes ===
Both types of homes - manufactured and modular - are commonly referred to as factory-built housing, but they are not identical. Modular homes are built to International Residential Code (IRC) code. Modular homes can be transported on flatbed trucks rather than being towed, and can lack axles and an automotive-type frame. However, some modular houses are towed behind a semi-truck or toter on a frame similar to that of a trailer. The house is usually in two pieces and is hauled by two separate trucks. Each frame has five or more axles, depending on the size of the house. Once the house has reached its location, the axles and the tongue of the frame are then removed, and the house is set on a concrete foundation by a large crane. Some modern modular homes, once fully assembled, are indistinguishable from site-built homes. In addition, modular homes:

- must conform to the same local, state and regional building codes as homes built on-site;
- are treated the same by banks as homes built on-site. They are easily refinanced, for example;
- must be structurally approved by inspectors;
- can be of any size, although the block sections from which they are assembled are uniformly sized;

=== Difference from IRC codes homes (site built) ===
Manufactured homes have several standard requirements that are more stringent than International Residential Code homes.

A National Fire Protection Association (NFPA) study from July 2011 shows that occurrence of fires is lower in manufactured housing and the injury rate is lower in manufactured housing. The justification behind the superior fire safety is due to the following higher standard requirements:

- The HUD standard requires a flame spread of 25 or less in water heater and furnace compartments.
- The HUD standard requires a flame spread of 50 or less on the wall behind the range.
- The HUD standard requires a flame spread of 75 or less on the ceilings.
- The HUD standard requires a flame spread of 25 or less to protect the bottoms and side of kitchen cabinets around the range.
- The HUD standard requires additional protection of cabinets above the range.
- The HUD standard requires trim larger than 6" to meet flame spread requirements.
- The HUD standard requires smoke detectors in the general living area.
- The HUD standard requires 2 exterior doors.
- The HUD standard requires bedroom doors to be within 35 feet of an exterior door.

=== Bay Area ===
The San Francisco Bay Area, located in Northern California, is known for its high real estate prices, making manufactured housing an increasingly popular alternative to traditional real estate. It is mainly the value of the land that makes real estate in this area so expensive. As of May 2011, the median price of a home in Santa Clara was $498,000, while the most expensive manufactured home with all the premium features was only $249,000. This drastic price difference is due to the fact that manufactured homes are typically placed in communities where individuals do not own the land, but instead pay a monthly site fee. This enables a consumer, who could otherwise not afford to live in the Bay Area, the opportunity to own a new home in this location. There are various communities of manufactured homes in the Bay Area, the largest being Casa de Amigos, located in Sunnyvale, California.

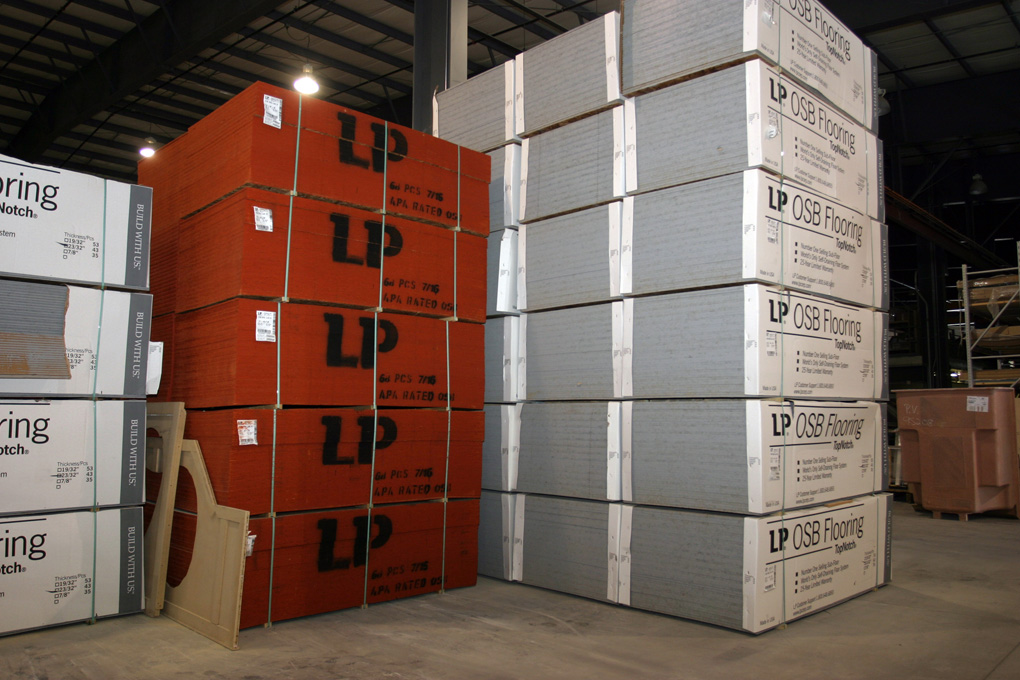
Bulk material storage

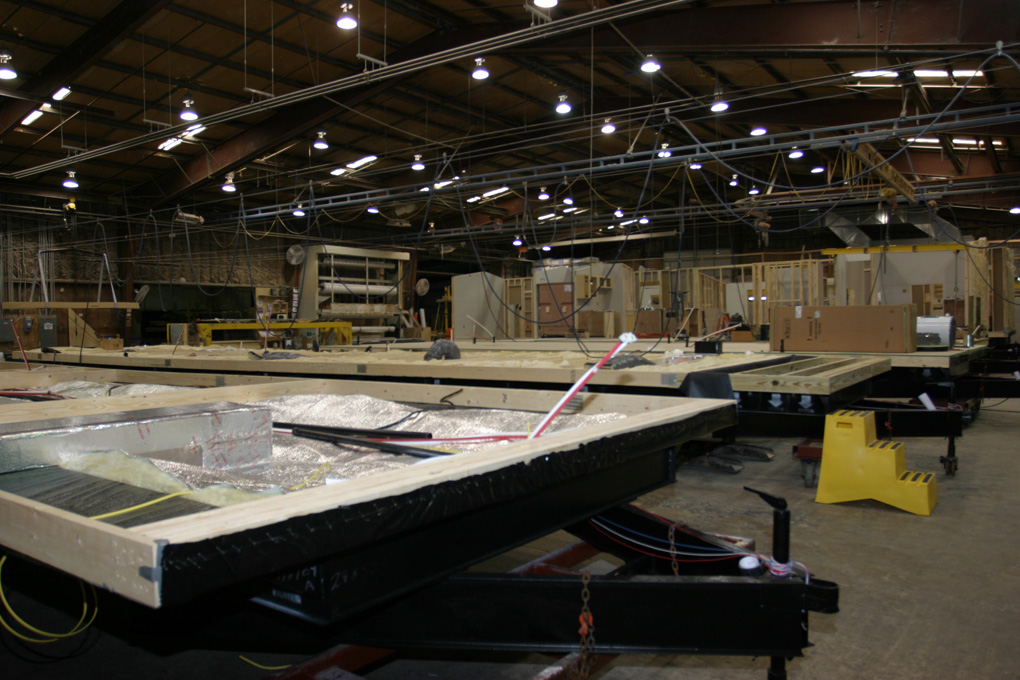
Construction starts with the frame

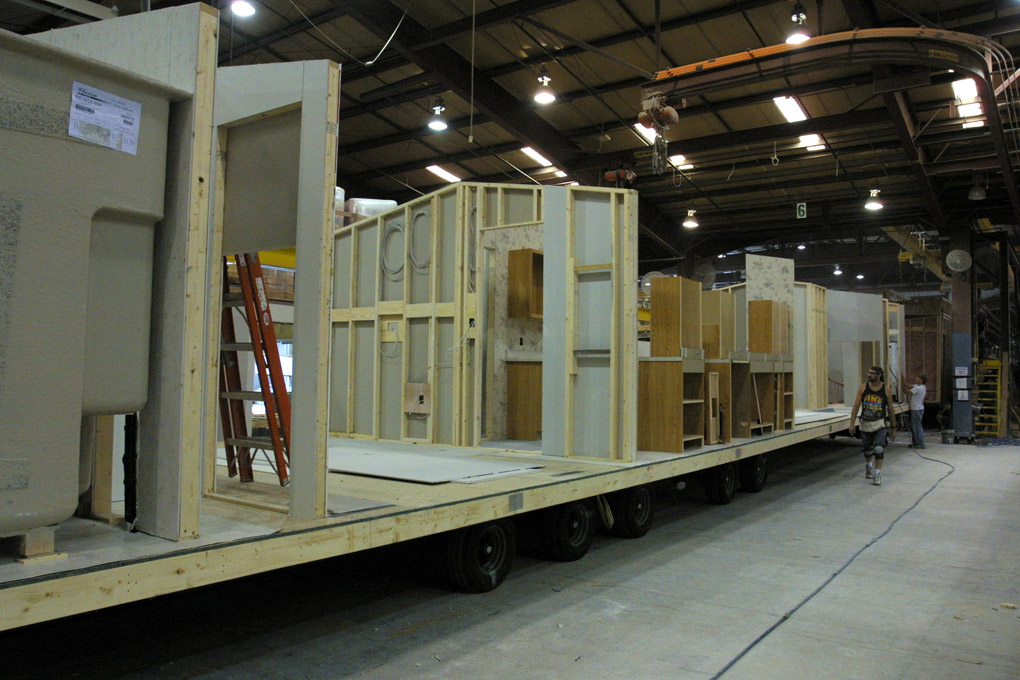
Interior wall assemblies are attached

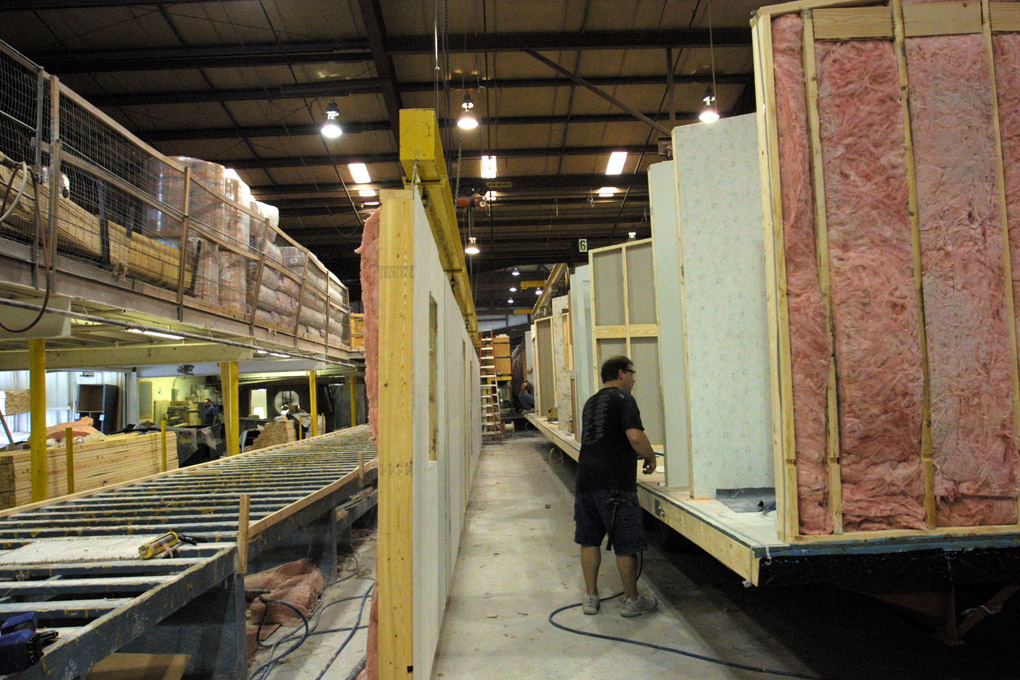
Exterior wall assemblies are set in place

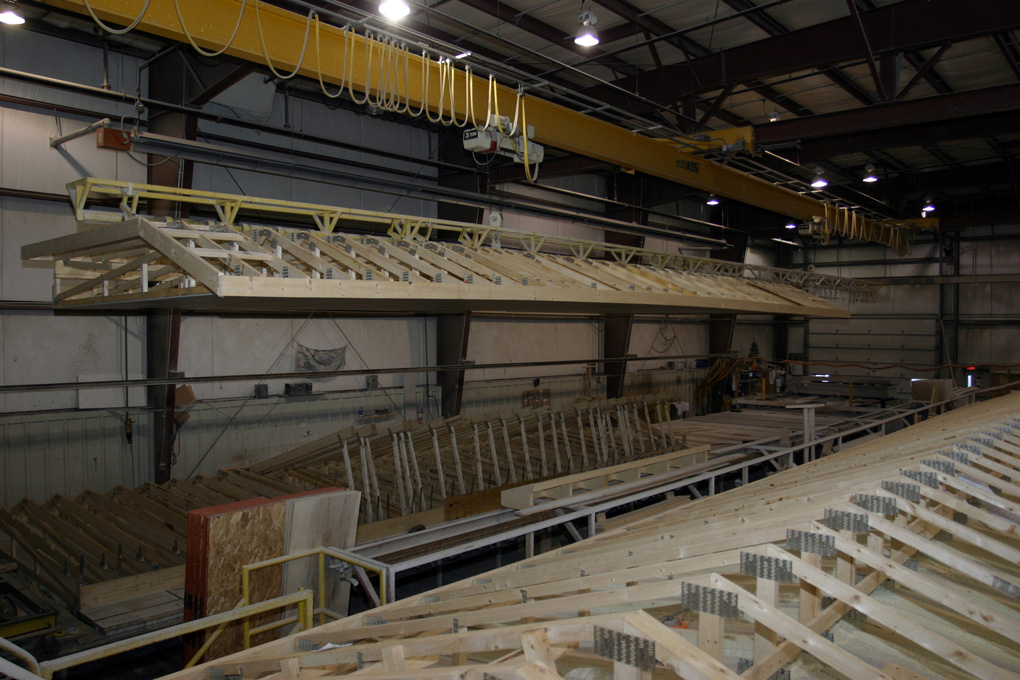
Roof assembly is set atop the house

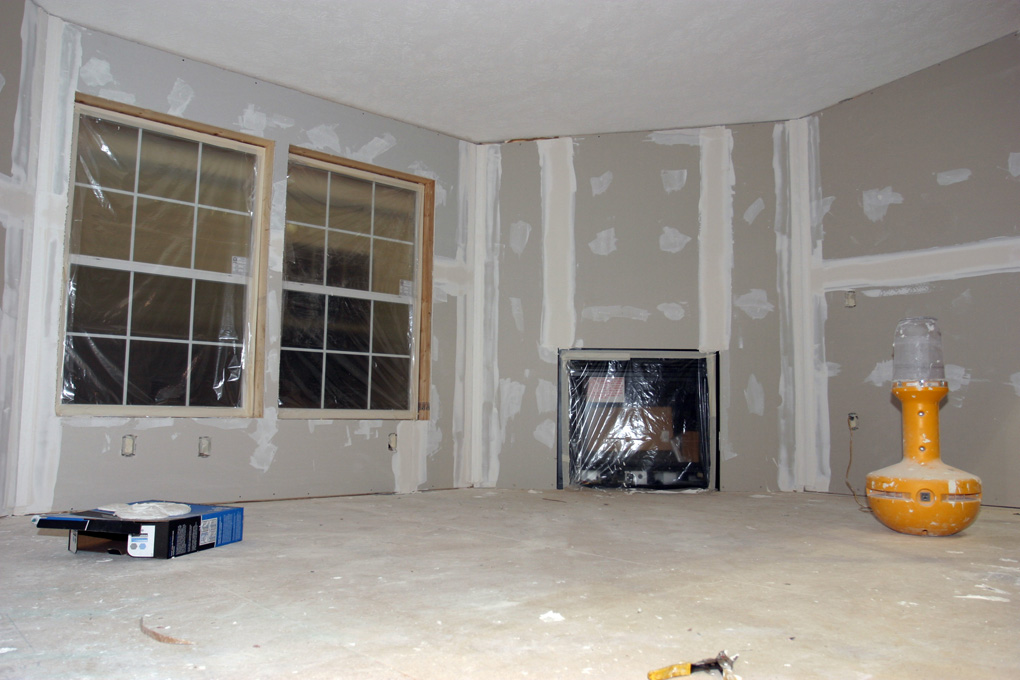
Drywall completed

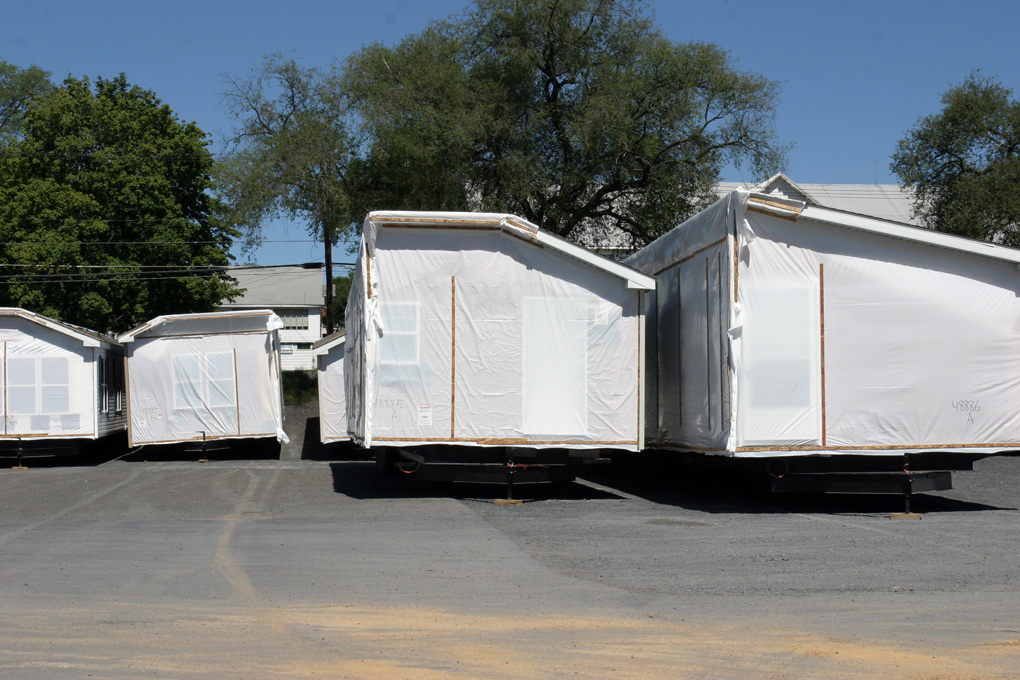
House is ready for delivery to site

== Australia ==
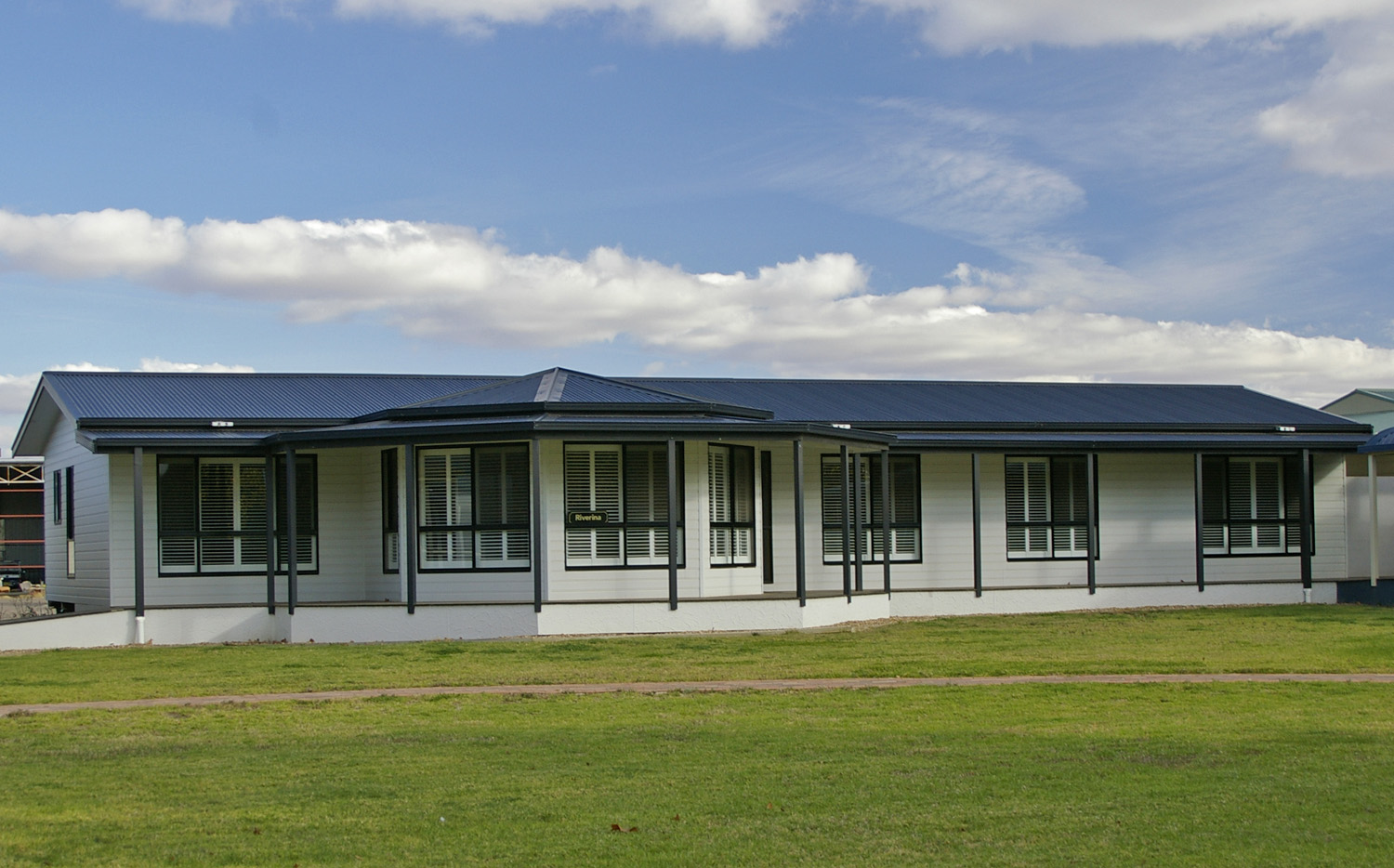
An Australian modern prefabricated house

In Australia these homes are commonly known as transportable homes, relocatable homes or prefabricated homes (not to be confused with the American meaning of the term). They are not as common as in the US, but the industry is expected to grow as this method of construction becomes more accepted.

Manufactured home parks refer to housing estates where the house owner rents the land instead of owning it. This is quite common in Queensland in both the form of tourist parks and over fifty estates. The term transportable homes tends to be used to refer to houses that are built on land that is owned by the house owner.

Typically the homes are built in regional areas where the cost of organizing tradespeople and materials is higher than in the cities. In particular prefabricated homes have been popular in mining towns or other towns experiencing demand for new housing in excess of what can be handled by local builders. This method of construction is governed by state construction legislation and is subject to local council approval and homeowners' warranty or home warranty insurance.

== Construction process ==
A manufactured home is built entirely inside a huge, climate-controlled factory by a team of craftsmen. The first step in the process is the flooring, which is built in sections, each attached to a permanent chassis with its own wheels and secured for transport upon the home's completion. Depending on the size of the house and the floorplan's layout, there may be two, three or even four sections. The flooring sections have heating, electrical and plumbing connections pre-installed before they are finished with laminate, tile or hardwood. Next, the walls are constructed on a flat level surface with insulation and interior Sheetrock before being lifted by crane into position and secured to the floor sections. The interior ceilings and roof struts are next, vapor sealed and secured to each section's wall frame before being shingled. Then, the exterior siding is added, along with the installation of doors and windows. Finally, interior finishing, such as sealing the drywall, is completed, along with fixture installation and finishing the electrical and plumbing connections. The exposed portions of each section, where they will eventually be joined together, are wrapped in plastic to protect them for transport.

With all the building site prep work completed, the building will be delivered by trucks towing the individual sections on their permanent chassis. The sections will be joined together securely, and all final plumbing and electrical connections are made before a decorative skirt or facade is applied to the bottom exterior of the house, hiding the chassis and finishing off the look of the home.

== See also ==
- British post-war temporary prefab houses
- HUD USER
- Prefabrication
- Reefer container housing units
- Regulatory Barriers Clearinghouse
- Lustron house
- All American Homes
- All Parks Alliance for Change
- Cardinal Industries, Inc.
- Dymaxion house
- Excel Homes
- A Decent Home, documentary
