= Penn Lyon Homes =

Construction firm

- Industry: Construction
- Founded: 1981; 45 years ago
- Defunct: September 2010
- Headquarters: Selinsgrove, Pennsylvania, United States
- Products: Modular home design; Systems-built homes; Commercial modular buildings

Penn Lyon Homes was a construction firm specializing in modular home design, systems-built homes, and commercial modular buildings with its products being distributed through independent builders, developers, and dealers. The company was founded in 1981, and operated out of Selinsgrove, Pennsylvania. Penn Lyon was named twice to the list of 500 fastest-growing privately held companies [1987, 1988] by INC Magazine.

Penn Lyon closed in September 2010.

In January 2011, custom modular home manufacturer Haven Custom Homes of Linthicum, Maryland began leasing the facility to begin building their new "Classic Homes by Haven" line. At that time, negotiations were proceeding for acquisition of the facility.
