= Excel Homes =

Custom Modular Home Manufacturer in United States

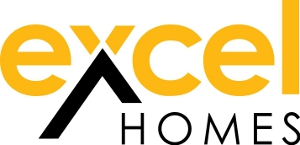
- Company type: Custom Modular Home Manufacturer
- Founded: 1984
- Defunct: 2016
- Fate: Bankruptcy
- Headquarters: Camp Hill, Pennsylvania, US
- Area served: Eastern United States
- Key people: Steve Scheinkman, President and CEO
- Number of employees: 800+
- Website: excelhomes.com

Excel Homes Group, LLC, in Camp Hill, PA, was a manufacturer of custom modular homes in the United States. According to the company, Excel Homes built more than 28,000 modular homes in its climate-controlled plants in Liverpool, Pennsylvania and Avis, Pennsylvania, since its founding in 1984. Excel Homes designed and manufactured custom modular homes for more than 400 home builders in a footprint that spanned from Maine to South Carolina and as far west as Ohio. On May 16, 2016, Excel Homes filed for Chapter 7 bankruptcy, which meant the company would be liquidated, leaving 280 people unemployed in Liverpool alone.

Excel Homes’ products and manufacturing process were covered in both the trade and mainstream media, including features on the History Channel’s Modern Marvels in 2009 and ABC-TV’s Extreme Makeover: Home Edition in 2010.

== History ==
1984 – The company that was known as Excel Homes begins manufacturing modular homes at the Liverpool, PA, manufacturing facility.

1997 – Ed Langley and Perry Bolton purchase the Liverpool facility and create Excel Homes, Inc., on October 23.

2004 – Excel Homes is recapitalized with major investment from Huron Capital Partners.

2007 – A newly installed corporate leadership team introduces an aggressive five-year strategic plan designed to increase market share for Excel Homes despite the housing industry’s current downturn.

2008 – Manufacturing facilities are added in Marlboro, New York and Oxford, Maine.

2010 - Ownership passes to H.I.G. Capital, walking away from previous owner's debts.

2014 - Steve Scheinkman and Jeffrey Samson buy a majority stake from H.I.G., becoming majority shareholders in Innovative Building Systems, Excel's parent company. H.I.G. becomes minority shareholder.

2015 - Excel web site begins mailing updates again after a hiatus of a few years.

2016 - Excel Homes filed for Chapter 7 liquidation.

== See also ==
- Prefabricated home
- Manufactured housing
- Modular home
