= Sara Terry =

American photographer (1955–2025)

Sara Terry (May 30, 1955 – October 13, 2025) was an American photographer and filmmaker.

== Early life and education ==
Sara Terry was born in Lansing, Michigan to LeGrand Terry and Margaret (Swan) Terry, and grew up in San Pedro, California. She graduated from California State University, Long Beach in 1977 with a degree in journalism. In 2012, she was awarded a Guggenheim Fellowship in Photography.

== Filmography ==
=== Director ===
- Fambul Tok (2011)
- Folk (2013)
- A Decent Home (2022)
