= Fambul Tok =

Fambul Tok (Family Talk)
- Directed by: Sara Terry
- Produced by: Sara Terry; Rory Kennedy; Libby Hoffman
- Cinematography: Henry Jacobson
- Edited by: Brian Singbiel
- Music by: Issar Shulman
- Production companies: Catalyst for Peace; Tarmac Road, LLC
- Distributed by: Circus Road Films
- Release date: 15 March 2011 (South by Southwest)
- Running time: 81 minutes
- Country: United States
- Language: English

Fambul Tok is a 2011 American documentary film about an organization that aims at reconciliation and forgiveness in communities that were affected by a long-running civil war in Sierra Leone. The film was directed by journalist Sara Terry and it premiered at the South by Southwest film festival. The title of the film is the organization's name, which translates to "family talk" in the Krio language. The film has received mixed reviews from critics. An epilogue to the film documented the community's reconciliation process with one of the major perpetrators of violence during the war.

== Background ==
The film covers the process of reconciliation among community members that have been affected by the Sierra Leone Civil War. The war lasted from 1991 and 2002, as three factions warred for control of the struggling nation. Sierra Leoneans were often forced into service with rebel forces and made to commit acts of atrocity against their neighbors in the community. A United Nations Development Programme publication estimates at least 70,000 deaths and 2.6 million people displaced during the war.

John Caulker is the founder of the nongovernmental organization known as Fambul Tok. The name describes a tradition of nightly bonfires in which family members discuss events and solve problems. The organization facilitates such talks, where community members identify and forgive those who have wronged them.

Journalist Sara Terry directed the movie. Terry had been a journalist for The Christian Science Monitor and freelance magazine writer before she became a photojournalist. After publishing a photography collection documenting war-torn Bosnia, Terry became increasingly interested in the effects of conflict, leading her to found The Aftermath Project. Fambul Tok was Terry's first feature-length film. Fambul Tok was produced by Terry, Rory Kennedy and Libby Hoffman. The film ran 81 minutes. It premiered at South by Southwest in 2011 and it was first shown in Europe during that year's Raindance Film Festival.

== Synopsis ==
The film focuses on three stories at which Caulker and his organization facilitate fambul tok reconciliation talks. The film opens at a bonfire in Foendor, a village in Sierra Leone. A young woman named Esther declares that she was raped at the age of 12 by fifteen men. She identifies one of the men as Joseph, her uncle. Joseph admits to the rape, but says that he was forced by rebels to commit the act under threats of death. Next, a man named Sahr similarly confronts his former friend Nyumah. When rebel forces accosted the men 17 years earlier, Sahr and Nyumah were boys. The rebels attempted to force Sahr to kill his own father. When Sahr refused, the rebels forced Nyumah to severely beat Sahr and to slash the throat of Sahr's father. Nyumah and Sahr reconcile after Nyumah admits to his actions and asks for forgiveness.

Much of the film focuses on the search for a man named Tamba Joe and his commander during the war, Captain Mohamed Savage. Tamba Joe was a native son who joined rebel forces during the war and committed violent acts against members of his community. A villager says that Tamba Joe killed and beheaded 17 members of his family. Mohamed Savage, nicknamed "Mr. Die", initially denied being the person responsible for the murders and violence in Foendor. Bodies of those killed during the war were thrown into the nearby "Savage Pit". Savage later admits to his role in the violence and plans to return to for a fambul tok. When it is learned that returning for reconciliation could place Savage at risk of prosecution, the meeting is called off. Tamba Joe's location is unknown, but his sister begs for forgiveness of the community.

== Reception ==
John DeFore of The Hollywood Reporter called the film a "shocking and inspiring look at the aftermath of Sierra Leone brutality and a campaign to heal devastated communities." William Brownridge of Toronto Film Scene wrote, "By forgiving members of their village, the people of Sierra Leone are doing what the international community couldn't: rebuilding their lives. The message of forgiveness is something we can all take away from this film, and perhaps by watching, we'll find ways to make our own lives better." Christopher Bell of Indiewire rated the film a "C+", calling the film "uneven". Bell said that Fambul Tok was "without a doubt a very compelling, humanist story, but Terry's neglect of the environment they live in is a large misstep."

== Epilogue ==
An epilogue to the film was subsequently released. At the time of the epilogue, the investigations and prosecutions into war crimes from the conflict are coming to a close but are not quite concluded. Savage returns to Foendor to ask for forgiveness at a fambul tok. Though a village chief is hesitant to reconcile with Savage, he acquiesces to the will of the village's people and forgives him.

== See also ==
- Truth and Reconciliation Commission (Sierra Leone)
