= A Decent Home =

2022 documentary film

A Decent Home is a 2022 documentary film about manufactured homes in the United States. It was directed by Sara Terry.
