= Toter =

Type of tractor unit

A toter, or toter truck, is a tractor unit specifically designed for the modular and manufactured housing industries.

== Characteristics ==
The toter is often confused or mistaken for a semi-trailer tractor. The key difference between the two is in the method of coupling. Toters are equipped with a 2 5/16-inch (59 mm) diameter ball that couples with the tow hitch on the tongue of a mobile or manufactured home or the removable transport frame of a modular home.

== See also ==
- Heavy hauler
