= All Parks Alliance for Change =

All Parks Alliance for Change (APAC)
- Formation: 1980
- Type: Grassroots, non-partisan nonprofit
- Headquarters: St. Paul, Minnesota, United States
- Region served: Minnesota
- Executive Director: Dave Anderson
- Website: http://www.allparksallianceforchange.org/

All Parks Alliance for Change (APAC) is a nonprofit organization that focuses on Minnesota mobile homes and parks.

== History ==
APAC was founded in 1980 by a group of park residents in Anoka County who initially worked to eliminate no-cause evictions, and to create new storm shelter standards. These efforts eventually lead to the establishment of a special section of state law for manufactured home parks (Minnesota Statute 327C).
