= Modular building =

Prefabricated building or house that consists of repeated sections

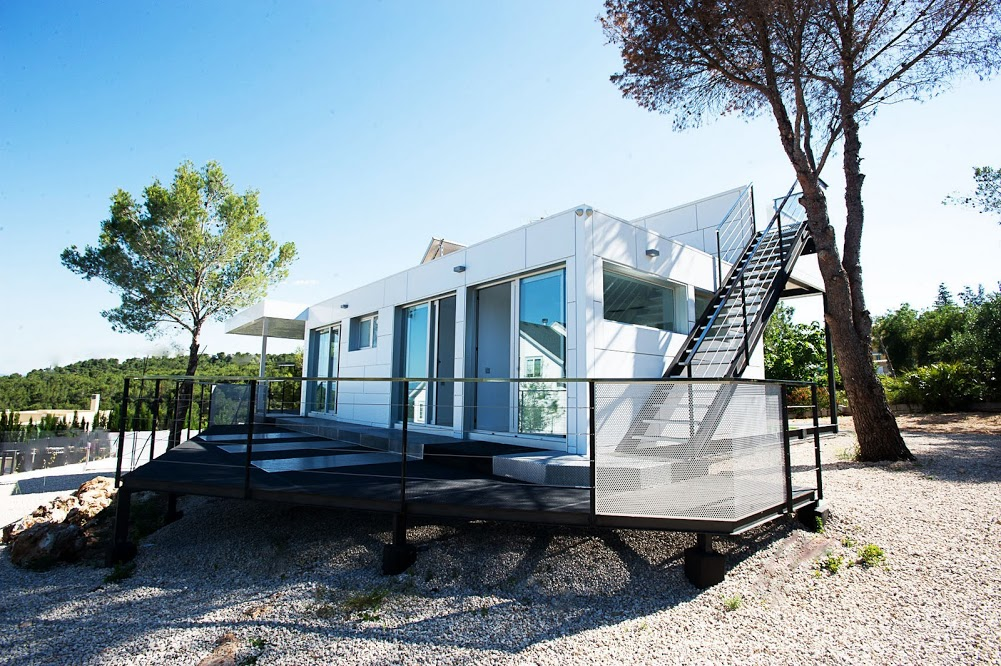
Prefabricated house in Valencia, Spain.

A modular building is a prefabricated building that consists of repeated sections called modules. Modularity involves constructing sections away from the building site, then delivering them to the intended site. Installation of the prefabricated sections is completed on site. Prefabricated sections are sometimes placed using a crane. The modules can be placed side-by-side, end-to-end, or stacked, allowing for a variety of configurations and styles. After placement, the modules are joined together using inter-module connections, also known as inter-connections. The inter-connections tie the individual modules together to form the overall building structure.

== Uses ==
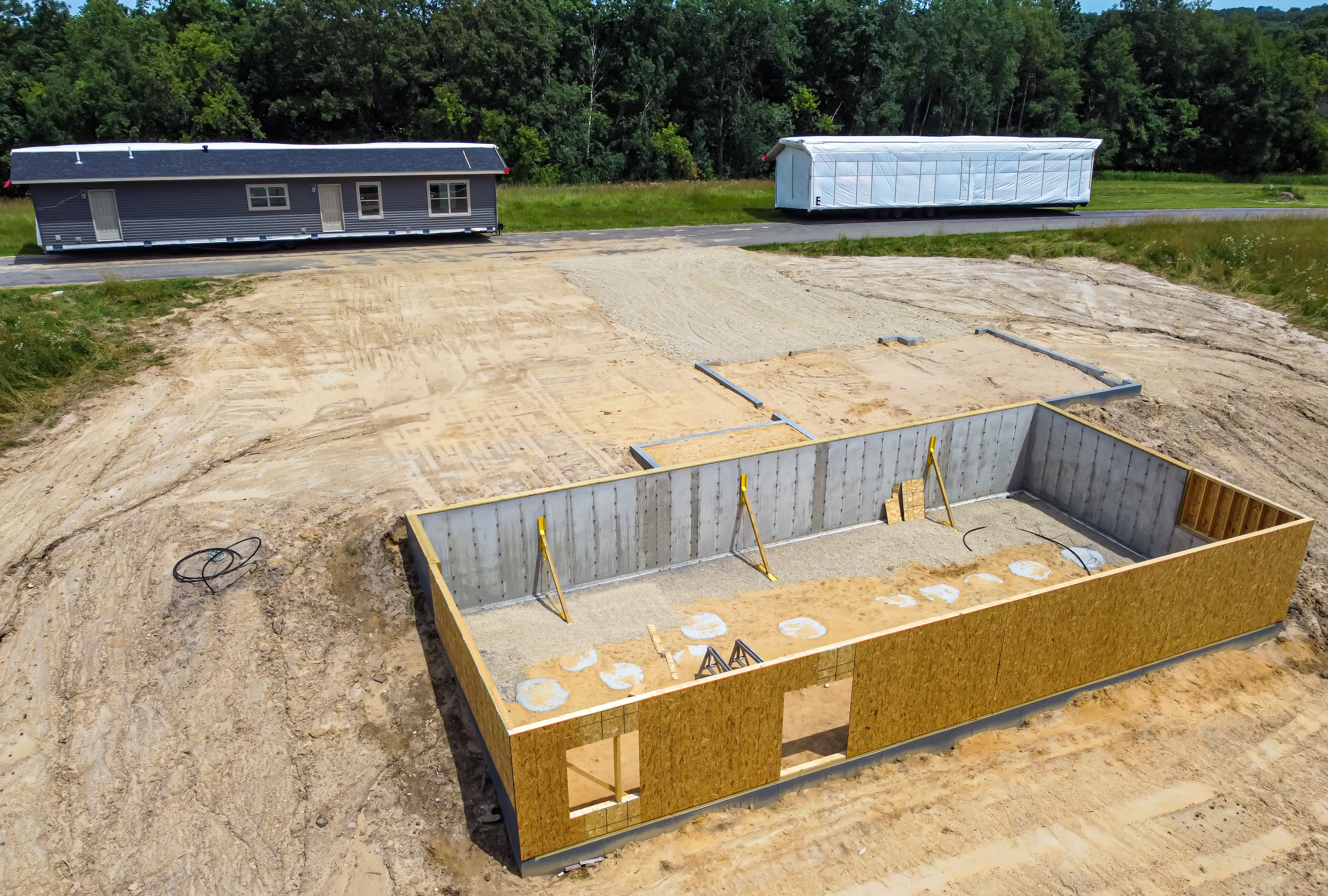
Modular home prefab sections to be placed on the foundation

Modular buildings may be used for long-term, temporary or permanent facilities, such as construction camps, schools and classrooms, civilian and military housing, and industrial facilities. Modular buildings are used in remote and rural areas where conventional construction may not be reasonable or possible, for example, the Halley VI accommodation pods used for a BAS Antarctic expedition. Other uses have included churches, health care facilities, sales and retail offices, fast food restaurants and cruise ship construction. They can also be used in areas that have weather concerns, such as hurricanes. Modular buildings are often used to provide temporary facilities, including toilets and ablutions at events. The portability of the buildings makes them popular with hire companies and clients alike. The use of modular buildings enables events to be held at locations where existing facilities are unavailable, or unable to support the number of event attendees.

== Construction process ==
Construction is offsite, using lean manufacturing techniques to prefabricate single or multi-story buildings in deliverable module sections. Often, modules are based around standard 20 foot containers, using the same dimensions, structures, building and stacking/placing techniques, but with smooth (instead of corrugated) walls, glossy white paint, and provisions for windows, power, potable water, sewage lines, telecommunications and air conditioning. Permanent Modular Construction (PMC) buildings are manufactured in a controlled setting and can be constructed of wood, steel, or concrete. Modular components are typically constructed indoors on assembly lines. Modules' construction may take as little as ten days but more often one to three months. PMC modules can be integrated into site built projects or stand alone and can be delivered with MEP, fixtures and interior finishes.

The buildings are 60% to 90% completed offsite in a factory-controlled environment, and transported and assembled at the final building site. This can comprise the entire building or be components or subassemblies of larger structures. In many cases, modular contractors work with traditional general contractors to exploit the resources and advantages of each type of construction. Completed modules are transported to the building site and assembled by a crane. Placement of the modules may take from several hours to several days. Off-site construction running in parallel to site preparation providing a shorter time to project completion is one of the common selling points of modular construction. Modular construction timeline

Permanent modular buildings are built to meet or exceed the same building codes and standards as site-built structures and the same architect-specified materials used in conventionally constructed buildings are used in modular construction projects. PMC can have as many stories as building codes allow. Unlike relocatable buildings, PMC structures are intended to remain in one location for the duration of their useful life.

== Manufacturing considerations ==
The entire process of modular construction places significance on the design stage. This is where practices such as Design for Manufacture and Assembly (DfMA) are used to ensure that assembly tolerances are controlled throughout manufacture and assembly on site. It is vital that there is enough allowance in the design to allow the assembly to take up any "slack" or misalignment of components. The use of advanced CAD systems, 3D printing and manufacturing control systems are important for modular construction to be successful. This is quite unlike on-site construction where the tradesman can often make the part to suit any particular installation.

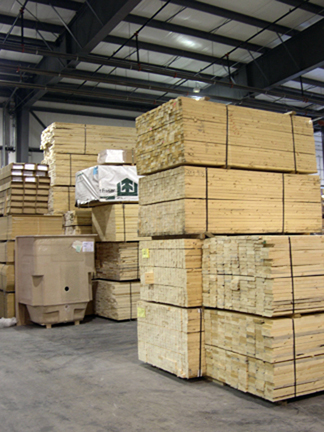
Bulk materials

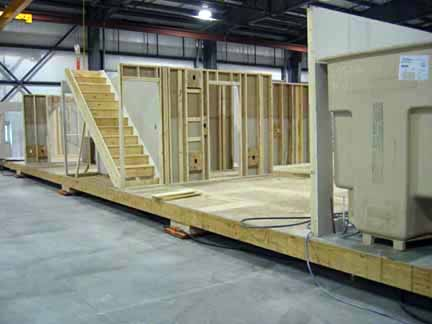
Walls attached to floor

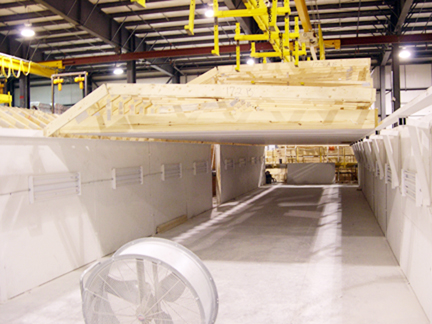
Ceiling drywalled in spray booth

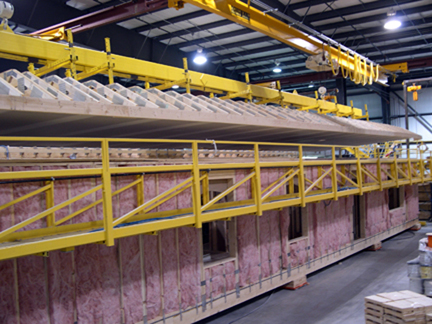
Roof set in place

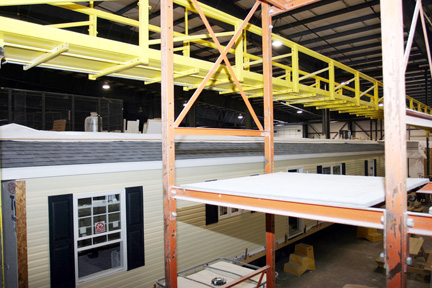
Roof shingled and siding installed

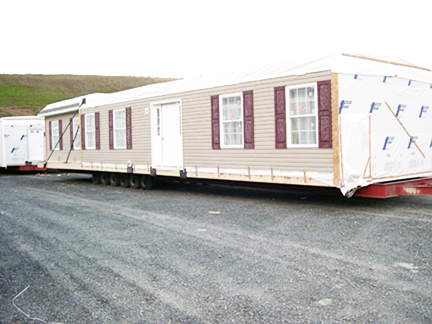
Ready for delivery to site

Two-story modular dwelling

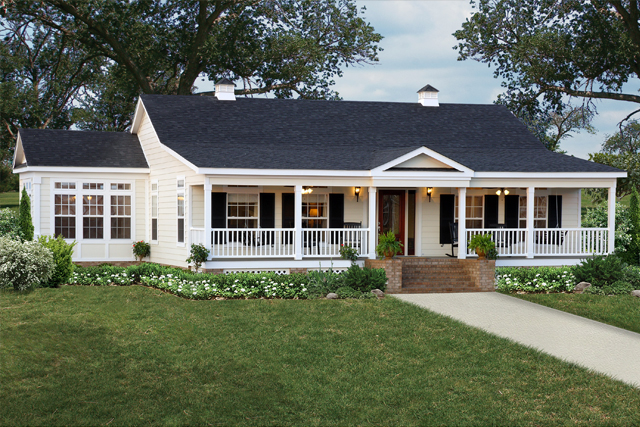
Pratt Modular Home in Tyler Texas

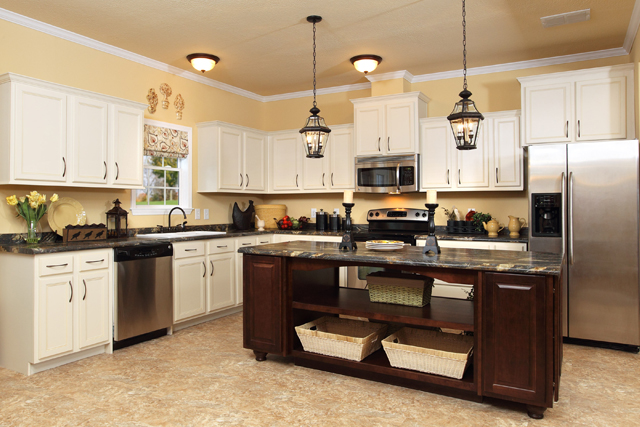
Pratt Modular Home kitchen

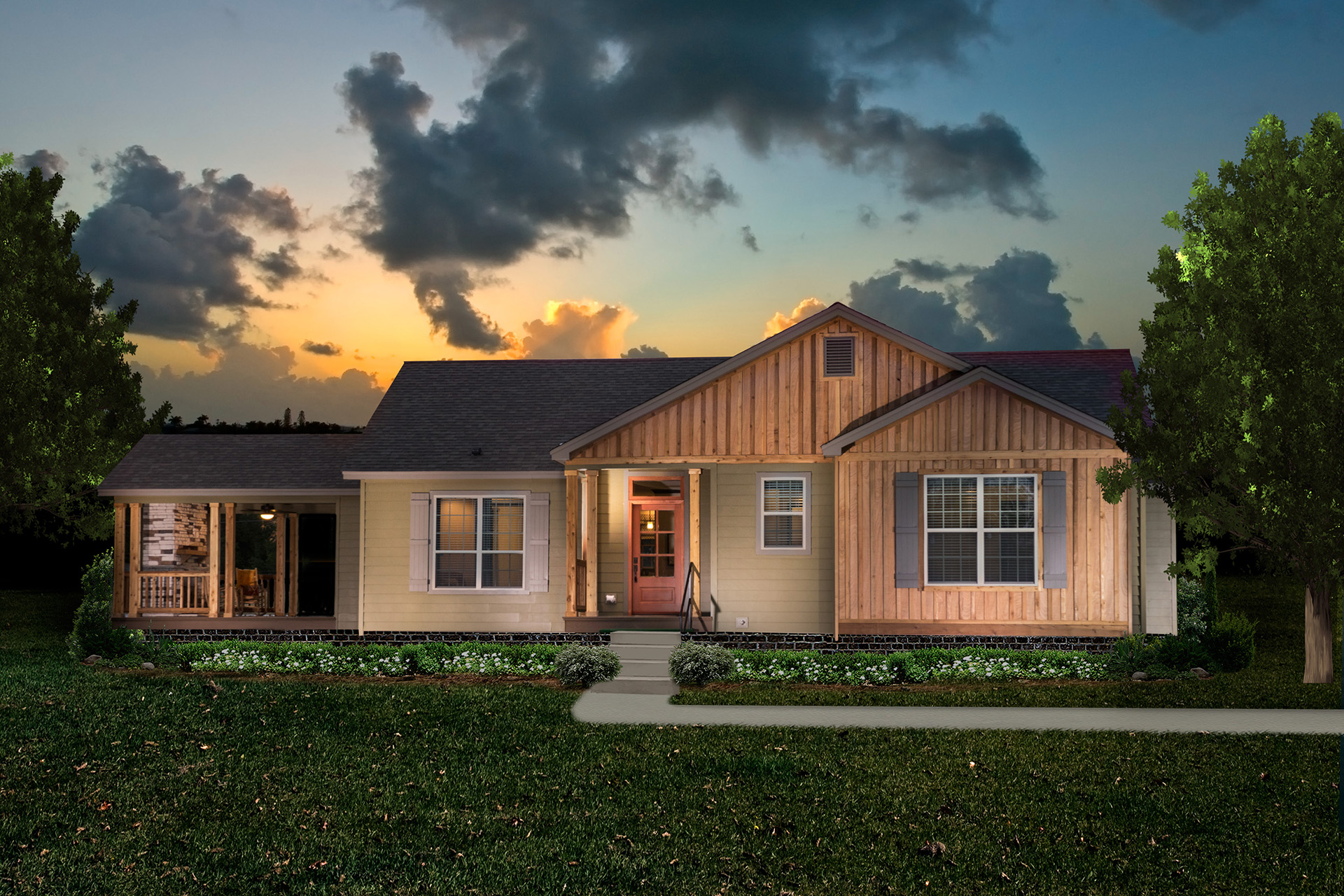
Pratt Modular Home in Tyler Texas

=== Upfront production investment ===
The development of factory facilities for modular homes requires significant upfront investment. To help address housing shortages in the 2010s, the United Kingdom Government (via Homes England) invested in modular housing initiatives. Several UK companies (for example, Ilke Homes, L&G Modular Homes, House by Urban Splash, Modulous, TopHat and Lighthouse) were established to develop modular homes as an alternative to traditionally-built residences, but failed as they could not book revenues quickly enough to cover the costs of establishing manufacturing facilities.

IIke Homes opened a factory in Knaresborough, Yorkshire in 2018, and Homes England invested £30m in November 2019, and a further £30m in September 2021. Despite a further fund-raising round, raising £100m in December 2022, Ilke Homes went into administration on 30 June 2023, with most of the company's 1,150 staff made redundant, and debts of £320m, including £68m owed to Homes England.

In 2015 Legal & General launched a modular homes operation, L&G Modular Homes, opening a 550,000 sq ft factory in Sherburn-in-Elmet, near Selby in Yorkshire. The company incurred large losses as it invested in its factory before earning any revenues; by 2019, it had lost over £100m. Sales revenues from a Selby project, plus schemes in Kent and West Sussex, started to flow in 2022, by which time the business's total losses had grown to £174m. Production was halted in May 2023, with L&G blaming local planning delays and the COVID-19 pandemic for its failure to grow its sales pipeline. The enterprise incurred total losses over seven years of £295m.

=== Market acceptance ===
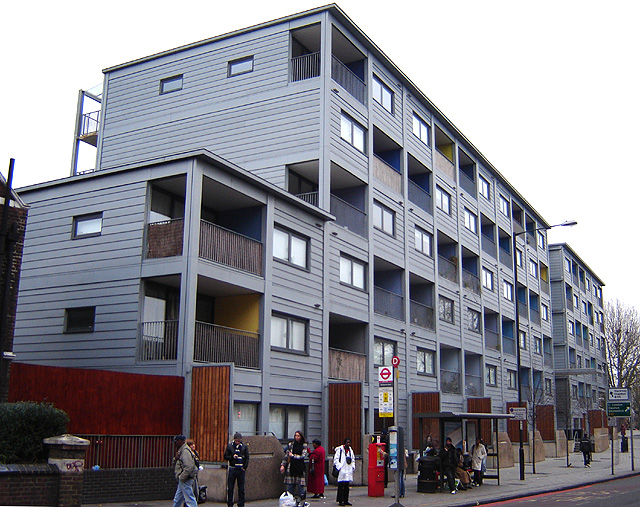
Raines Court is a multi-story modular housing block in Stoke Newington, London, one of the first two residential buildings in Britain of this type. (December 2005)

Some home buyers and some lending institutions resist consideration of modular homes as equivalent in value to site-built homes. While the homes themselves may be of equivalent quality, entrenched zoning regulations and psychological marketplace factors may create hurdles for buyers or builders of modular homes and should be considered as part of the decision-making process when exploring this type of home as a living and/or investment option. In the UK and Australia, modular homes have become accepted in some regional areas; however, they are not commonly built in major cities. Modular homes are becoming increasingly common in Japanese urban areas, due to improvements in design and quality, speed and compactness of onsite assembly, as well as due to lowering costs and ease of repair after earthquakes. Recent innovations allow modular buildings to be indistinguishable from site-built structures. Surveys have shown that individuals can rarely tell the difference between a modular home and a site-built home.

=== Modular homes vs. mobile homes ===
Differences include the building codes that govern the construction, types of material used and how they are appraised by banks for lending purposes. Modular homes are built to either local or state building codes as opposed to manufactured homes, which are also built in a factory but are governed by a federal building code. The codes that govern the construction of modular homes are exactly the same codes that govern the construction of site-constructed homes. In the United States, all modular homes are constructed according to the International Building Code (IBC), IRC, BOCA or the code that has been adopted by the local jurisdiction. In some states, such as California, mobile homes must still be registered yearly, like vehicles or standard trailers, with the Department of Motor Vehicles or other state agency. This is true even if the owners remove the axles and place it on a permanent foundation.

=== Recognizing a mobile or manufactured home ===
A mobile home should have a small metal tag on the outside of each section. If a tag cannot be located, details about the home can be found in the electrical panel box. This tag should also reveal a manufacturing date. Modular homes do not have metal tags on the outside but will have a dataplate installed inside the home, usually under the kitchen sink or in a closet. The dataplate will provide information such as the manufacturer, third party inspection agency, appliance information, and manufacture date.

=== Materials ===
The materials used in modular buildings are of the same quality and durability as those used in traditional construction, preserving characteristics such as acoustic insulation and energy efficiency, as well as allowing for attractive and innovative designs thanks to their versatility. Most commonly used are steel, wood and concrete.

- Steel: Because it is easily moldable, it allows for innovation in design and aesthetics.
- Wood: Wood is an essential part of most modular buildings. Thanks to its lightness, it facilitates the work of assembling and moving the prefabricated modules.
- Concrete: Concrete offers a solid structure that is ideal for the structural reinforcement of permanent modular buildings. It is increasingly being used as a base material in this type of building, thanks to its various characteristics such as fire resistance, energy savings, greater acoustic insulation, and durability.

Wood-frame floors, walls and roof are often utilized. Some modular homes include brick or stone exteriors, granite counters and steeply pitched roofs. Modulars can be designed to sit on a perimeter foundation or basement. In contrast, mobile homes are constructed with a steel chassis that is integral to the integrity of the floor system. Modular buildings can be custom built to a client's specifications. Current designs include multi-story units, multi-family units and entire apartment complexes. The negative stereotype commonly associated with mobile homes has prompted some manufacturers to start using the term "off-site construction."

New modular offerings include other construction methods such as cross-laminated timber frames.

=== Financing ===
Mobile homes often require special lenders.

Modular homes on the other hand are financed as site built homes with a construction loan

== Standards and zoning considerations ==
Typically, modular dwellings are built to local, state or council code, resulting in dwellings from a given manufacturing facility having differing construction standards depending on the final destination of the modules. The most important zones that manufacturers have to take into consideration are local wind, heat, and snow load zones. For example, homes built for final assembly in a hurricane-prone, earthquake or flooding area may include additional bracing to meet local building codes. Steel and/or wood framing are common options for building a modular home.

Some US courts have ruled that zoning restrictions applicable to mobile homes do not apply to modular homes since modular homes are designed to have a permanent foundation. Additionally, in the US, valuation differences between modular homes and site-built homes are often negligible in real estate appraisal practice; modular homes can, in some market areas, (depending on local appraisal practices per Uniform Standards of Professional Appraisal Practice) be evaluated the same way as site-built dwellings of similar quality. In Australia, manufactured home parks are governed by additional legislation that does not apply to permanent modular homes. Possible developments in equivalence between modular and site-built housing types for the purposes of real estate appraisals, financing and zoning may increase the sales of modular homes over time.

=== CLASP (Consortium of Local Authorities Special Programme) ===
The Consortium of Local Authorities Special Programme (abbreviated and more commonly referred to as CLASP) was formed in England in 1957 to combine the resources of local authorities with the purpose of developing a prefabricated school building programme. Initially developed by Charles Herbert Aslin, the county architect for Hertfordshire, the system was used as a model for several other counties, most notably Nottinghamshire and Derbyshire. CLASP's popularity in these coal mining areas was in part because the system permitted fairly straightforward replacement of subsidence-damaged sections of building.

=== Building strength ===
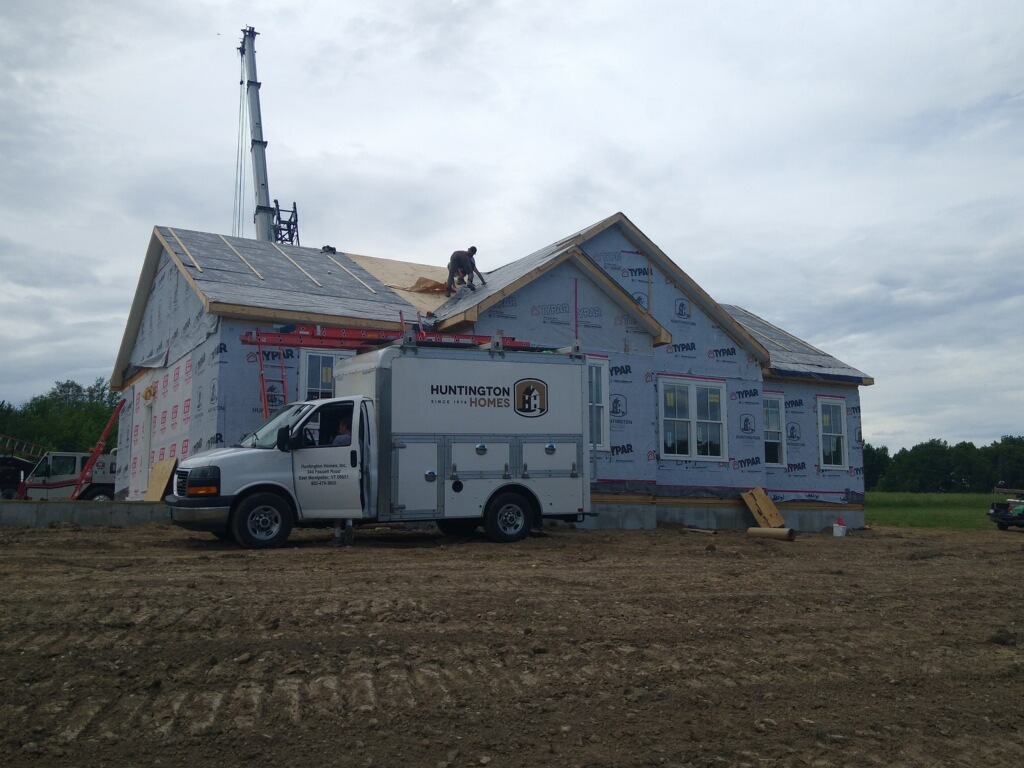
Modular home in Vermont

Modular homes are designed to be stronger than traditional homes by, for example, replacing nails with screws, adding glue to joints, and using 8–10% more lumber than conventional housing. This is to help the modules maintain their structural integrity as they are transported on trucks to the construction site. However, there are few studies on the response of modular buildings to transport and handling stresses. It is therefore presently difficult to predict transport induced damage.

When FEMA studied the destruction wrought by Hurricane Andrew in Dade County Florida, they concluded that modular and masonry homes fared best compared to other construction.

=== CE marking ===
The CE mark is a construction norm that guarantees the user of mechanical resistance and strength of the structure. It is a label given by European community empowered authorities for end-to-end process mastering and traceability.

All manufacturing operations are being monitored and recorded:

- Suppliers have to be known and certified,
- Raw materials and goods being sourced are to be recorded by batch used,
- Elementary products are recorded and their quality is monitored,
- Assembly quality is managed and assessed on a step by step basis,
- When a modular unit is finished, a whole set of tests are performed and if quality standards are met, a unique number and EC stamp is attached to and on the unit.

This ID and all the details are recorded in a database, At any time, the producer has to be able to answer and provide all the information from each step of the production of a single unit, The EC certification guaranties standards in terms of durability, resistance against wind and earthquakes.

== Open modular building ==
The term Modularity can be perceived in different ways. It can even be extended to building P2P (peer-to-peer) applications; where a tailored use of the P2P technology is with the aid of a modular paradigm. Here, well-understood components with clean interfaces can be combined to implement arbitrarily complex functions in the hopes of further proliferating self-organising P2P technology. Open modular buildings are an excellent example of this. Modular building can also be open source and green. Bauwens, Kostakis and Pazaitis elaborate on this kind of modularity. They link modularity to the construction of houses.

This commons-based activity is geared towards modularity. The construction of modular buildings enables a community to share designs and tools related to all the different parts of house construction. A socially-oriented endeavour that deals with the external architecture of buildings and the internal dynamics of open source commons. People are thus provided with the tools to reconfigure the public sphere in the area where they live, especially in urban environments. There is a robust socializing element that is reminiscent of pre-industrial vernacular architecture and community-based building.

Some organisations already provide modular housing. Such organisations are relevant as they allow for the online sharing of construction plans and tools. These plans can be then assembled, through either digital fabrication like 3D printing or even sourcing low-cost materials from local communities. It has been noticed that given how easy it is to use these low-cost materials are (for example: plywood), it can help increase the permeation of these open buildings to areas or communities that lack the know-how or abilities of conventional architectural or construction firms. Ergo, it allows for a fundamentally more standardised way of constructing houses and buildings. The overarching idea behind it remains key - to allow for easy access to user-friendly layouts which anyone can use to build in a more sustainable and affordable way.

Modularity in this sense is building a house from different standardised parts, like solving a jigsaw puzzle.

3D printing can be used to build the house.

The main standard is OpenStructures and its derivative Autarkytecture.

== Research and development ==
Modular construction is the subject of continued research and development worldwide as the technology is applied to taller and taller buildings. Research and development is carried out by modular building companies and also research institutes such as the Modular Building Institute and the Steel Construction Institute.

== See also ==
- Affordable housing
- Alternative housing
- Commercial modular construction
- Construction 3D printing
- Container home
- Kit house
- List of BIM software
- MAN steel house
- Manufactured housing
- Modern methods of construction
- Modular design
- Portable building
- Prefabrication
- Open-source architecture
- Open source hardware
- OpenStructures
- Prefabricated home
- Relocatable buildings
- Recreational vehicles
- Shipping container architecture
- Stick-built home
- Tiny house movement
- Toter
