= Relocatable building =

A relocatable building is a partially or completely assembled building that was constructed in a building manufacturing facility using a modular construction process. It is designed to be reused or repurposed multiple times and transported to different locations. Relocatable buildings can offer more flexibility and a much quicker time to occupancy than conventionally built structures. They are essential in cases where speed, temporary swing space, and the ability to relocate are necessary. These buildings are cost effective, code compliant solutions for many markets.

== Benefits ==
- Rapidly deployable - Because construction of relocatable buildings can occur simultaneously with the site work, projects can be completed 30% to 50% sooner than traditional construction.
- Quality built - Modular buildings are built to meet or exceed the same building codes and standards as site-built structures and the same architect-specified materials can be used – wood, concrete and steel. Because they must be trucked long distances and then lifted up by a crane onto the foundation, they must also be extremely structurally sound. Modular units may also be designed to fit in with external aesthetics of any existing building and modular units once assembled are virtually indistinguishable from their site-built counterparts.
- Service remote locations - Given that relocatable buildings are constructed offsite in controlled settings, finding a skilled labor force in remote locations is less of an issue. From the hottest, driest desert locations to the coldest, most severe winter climates, relocatable buildings can be utilized anywhere.
- Shorter depreciation schedules - The primary difference between permanent modular construction and relocatable buildings is that in many cases, relocatable buildings are not permanently affixed to real estate. This allows for the building to be considered personal property or equipment and depreciated over a shorter span.

=== Sustainability ===
- Less material waste - Modular construction makes it possible to optimize construction materials purchases and usage while minimizing on-site waste and offering a higher quality product to the buyer. Bulk materials are delivered to the manufacturing facility where they are stored in a protected environment safe from theft and exposure to the environmental conditions of a job site.

According to the UK group WRAP, up to a 90% reduction in materials can be achieved through the use of modular construction. Materials minimized included: wood pallets, shrink wrap, cardboard, plasterboard, timber, concrete, bricks, and cement.

- Less site disturbance - The modular structure is constructed off-site simultaneous to foundation and other site work, thereby reducing the time and impact on the surrounding site environment, as well as reducing the number of vehicles and equipment needed at the site.
- Greater flexibility and reuse - When the needs change, modular buildings can be disassembled and the modules relocated or refurbished for their next use reducing the demand for raw materials and minimizing the amount of energy expended to create a building to meet the new need. In essence, the entire building can be recycled in some cases.
- Improved air quality - Many of the indoor air quality issues identified in new construction result from high moisture levels in the framing materials. Because the modular structure is substantially completed in a factory-controlled setting using dry materials, the potential for high levels of moisture being trapped in the new construction is eliminated.

Modular buildings can also contribute to LEED requirements in any category site-built construction can, and can even provide an advantage in the areas of sustainable sites, energy and atmosphere, materials and resources, and indoor environmental quality. Modular construction can also provide an advantage in similar categories in the International Green Construction Code.

== Key markets ==
Relocatable modular buildings are utilized in any application where a relocatable building can meet a temporary space need. The primary markets served are education, general office, retail, healthcare, construction-site and in-plant offices, security, telecommunications/data/equipment centers, and emergency housing/disaster relief.

== See also ==
- Commercial modular construction – Non-residential structures that are mostly built offsite
- Permanent modular construction – Prefabricated building or house that consists of repeated sections
