= Fabricated geomembranes =

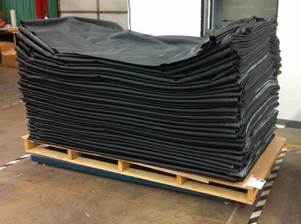
Fabricated geomembranes folded

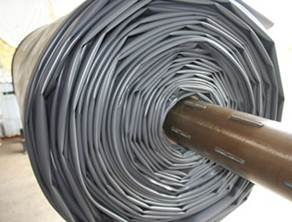
Fabricated geomembranes rolled

Geomembranes are thin plastic sheets that are essentially impervious and are used to prevent leakage from liquid or solid-storage facilities. Geomembranes are frequently referred to as Flexible Membrane Liners (FMLs) in environmental regulations, such as in Subtitle D of the Resource Conservation and Recovery Act.

== Overview ==
Fabricated geomembranes are geomembranes that are flexible enough to be seamed or welded into large panels in a factory, folded, transported to the project site, unfolded without creasing or damage, and field seamed and tested as necessary. These geomembranes are relatively thin (usually less than 45 mils, [1.1 mm] thick), flexible, and can be reinforced with fabrics. Fabricated geomembranes can be accordion folded or rolled up to facilitate deployment and reduce double folds as shown in photographs.

Factory fabrication reduces field seaming by 70 to 90% depending on the geometry of the installation and weight of the geomembrane material used, which reduces field testing and patching, installation time, and overall cost. The panel size is limited only by the allowable shipping weight, which depends on the mode of transportation. The reduction of installation time and testing is particularly important in harsh environments which can extend the “field installation season”. Fabricated panels can be large enough to create “drop-in” liners that do not require any field seaming, testing, or patching which speeds installation and improves quality. Fabricated geomembranes also allow a more modular construction approach which results in less resources having to be committed to one location for an extended period, e.g., personnel and deployment, welding, and testing equipment. Modular construction also adds more predictability to project scheduling by reducing weather, transportation, site access, testing and data interpretation, and labor issues.

== Applications ==
Fabricated geomembranes can be used for a variety of applications including in alphabetical order: aquaculture, baffle curtains, canals, decorative ponds, deicing fluid ponds, drill pad liners for oil and gas development, exposed or floating covers, fertilizer containment, golf course ponds, hydrocarbon containment, landfill liners and covers, mine tailings ponds and heap leach pads, reservoirs, sewage lagoons, tank liners, and wastewater ponds.

== Installation practices ==
Flexible geomembranes are fabricated into panels the size of which is controlled by the allowable shipping and handling weight. It is common to ship panels that weigh 1,816 kg (4,000 Ibs.) but panels as heavy as 4,086 kg (9,000 Ibs.) have been shipped.

After moving the panel to the proper deployment location as indicated on the Panel Layout Diagram for the project, the panel is unfolded or unrolled from the shipping pallet. The pallet is usually on a front-end loader or forklift which moves backwards to facilitate unfolding or unrolling of the panel. Pulling the geomembrane panel off the pallet or the roll by a chain is not recommended because it may damage the geomembrane. Deployment personnel are then positioned approximately 4.6 m (15 ft) apart along the edges of the panel to unfold and move the panel into the proper location. If the edge to be gripped is to be subsequently welded or bonded, the panel edge is folded back about 0.6 to 1.0 m (2.0 to 3.3 ft), creating a fold. The fold is gripped using the 0.3 m long by 10 mm (1-foot long by 2 inch) diameter smooth wooden dowel or a smooth grade stake rather than the edge itself. This is to avoid stretching the panel edge where it is to be bonded to another panel. As the panel is pulled out, it is necessary to maintain air under the geomembrane to reduce friction with the ground surface. This can be accomplished by holding the panel edge and advancing at a rate fast enough to create air under the geomembrane as it is unfolded. Another method is to “fan” air under the geomembrane by raising and lowering the edge of the panel to create a wave-like action across the liner as it is being spread. After the panel is set in the exact position, it is welded or bonded to adjacent panels.
