= Steel building (disambiguation) =

Steel building may refer to:

- A smaller structure made predominantly of steel. See Steel building.
- A structure with a steel frame.
- The U.S. Steel Tower in Pittsburgh, Pennsylvania.
