= Building =

Enclosed structure

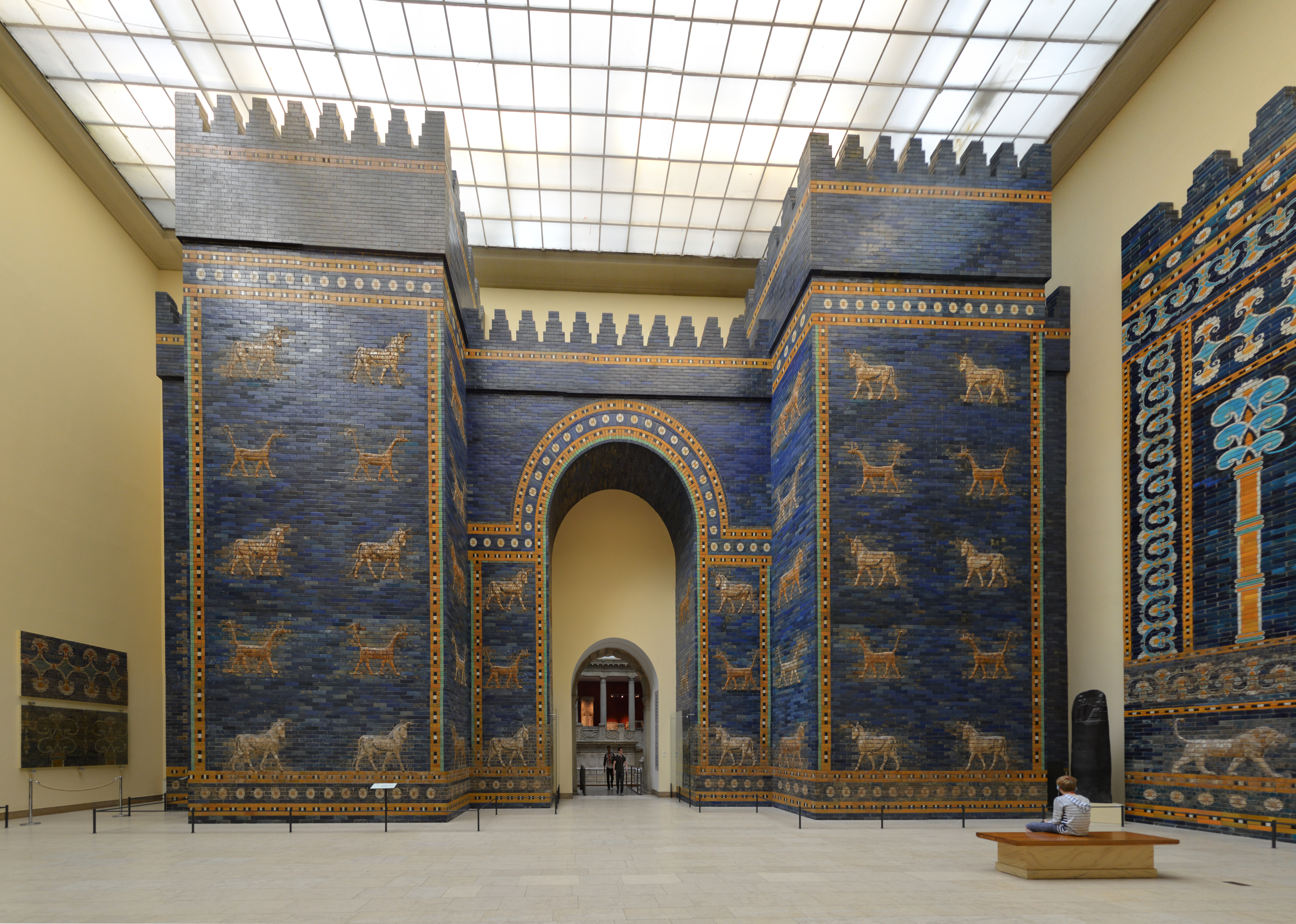
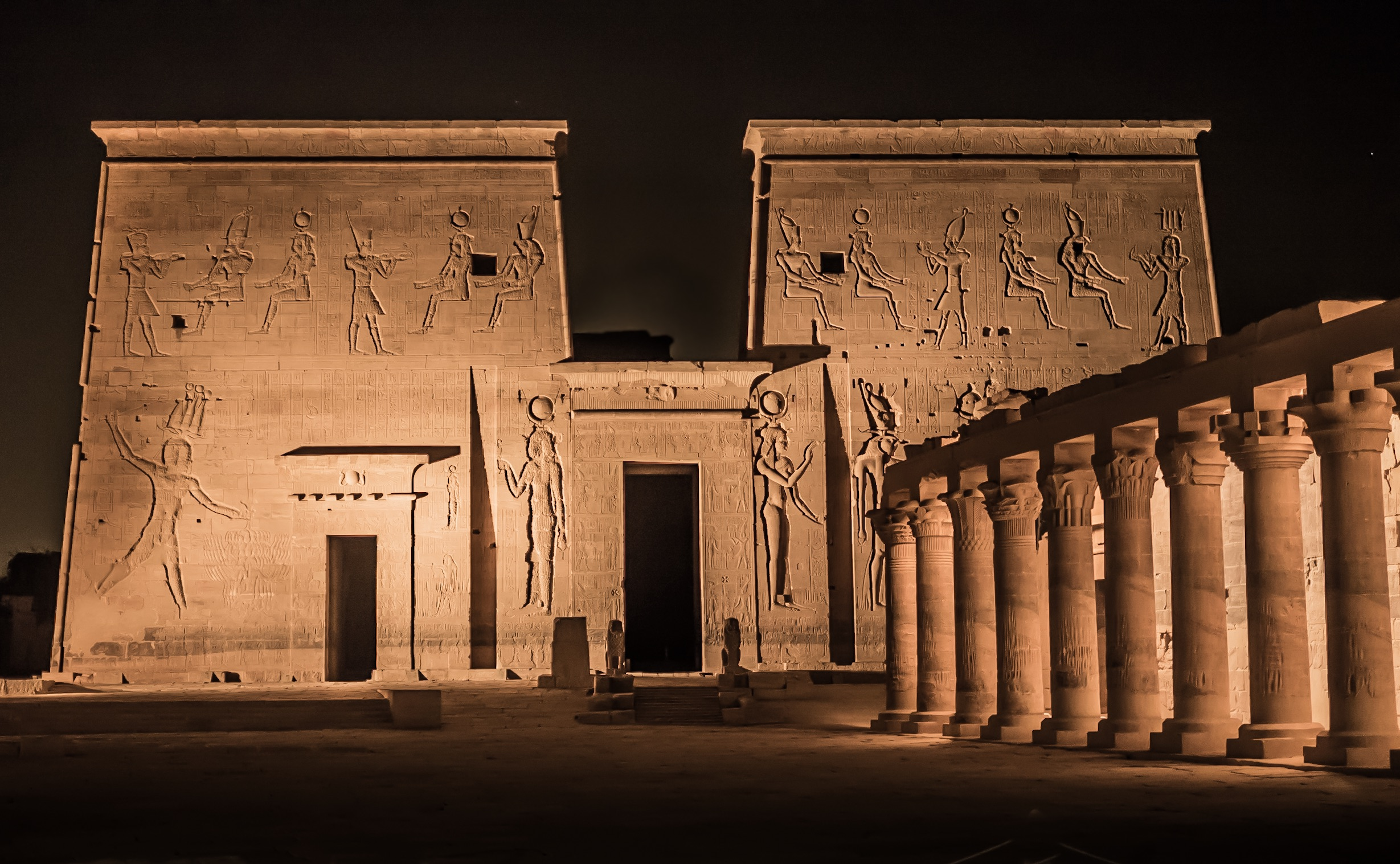
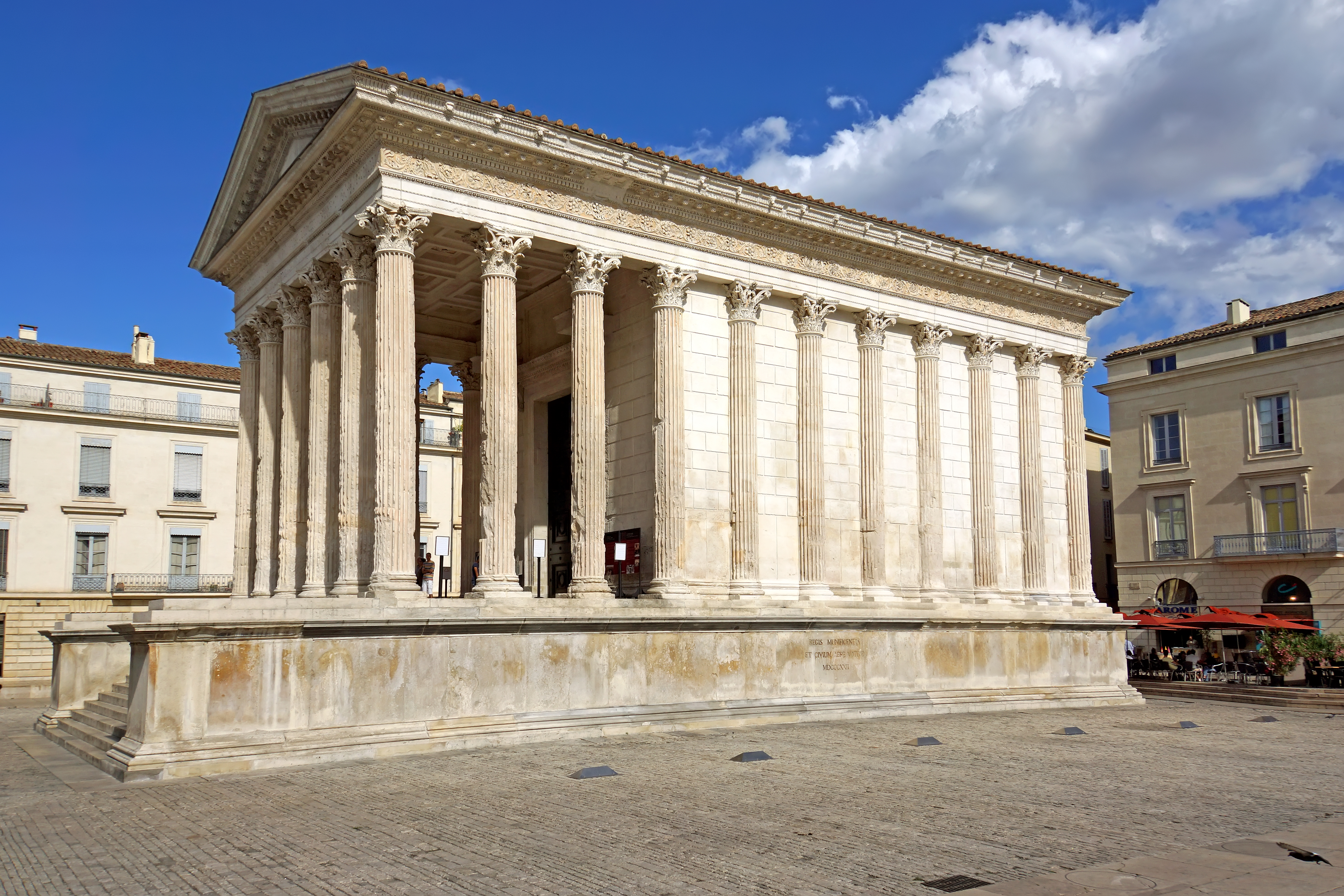
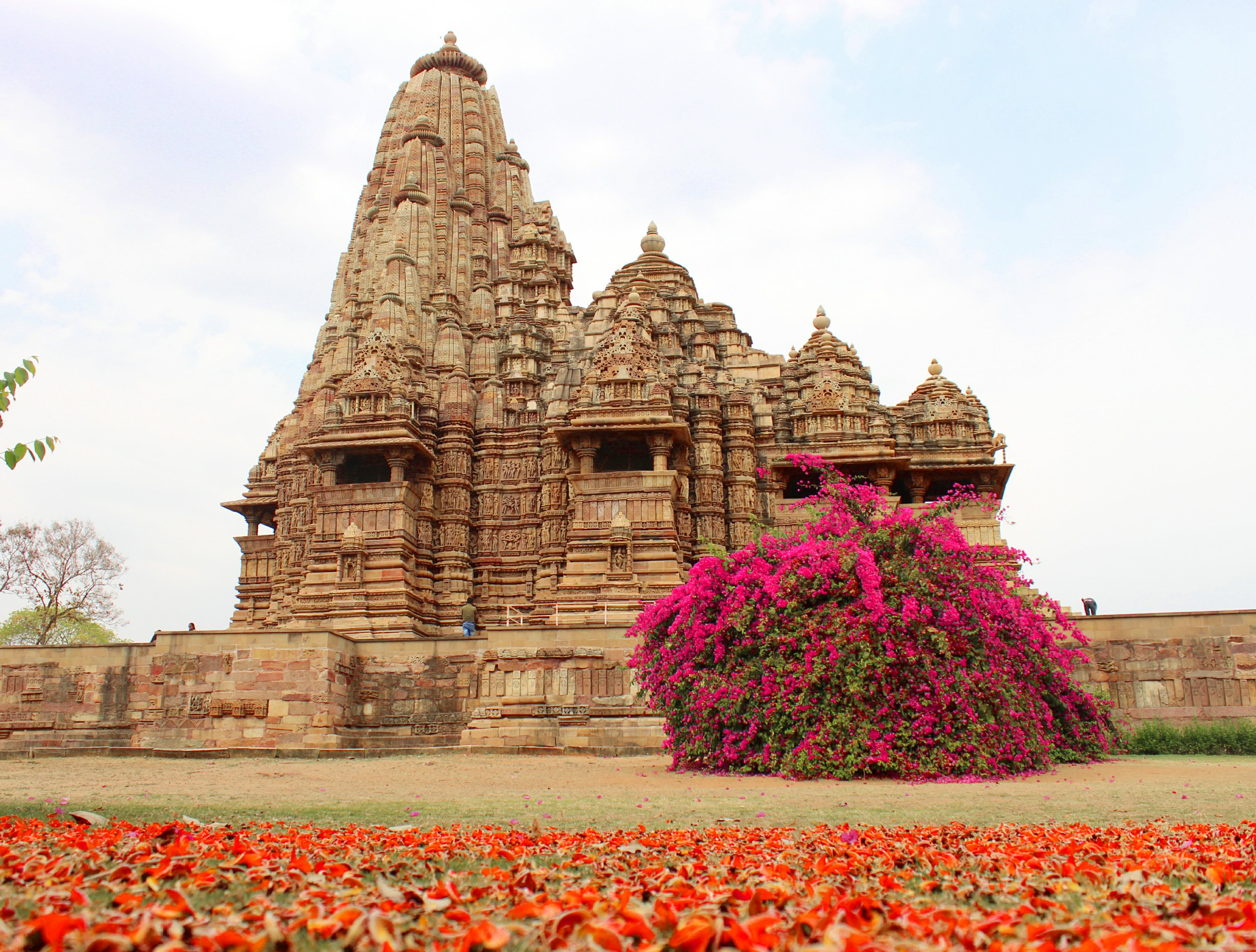
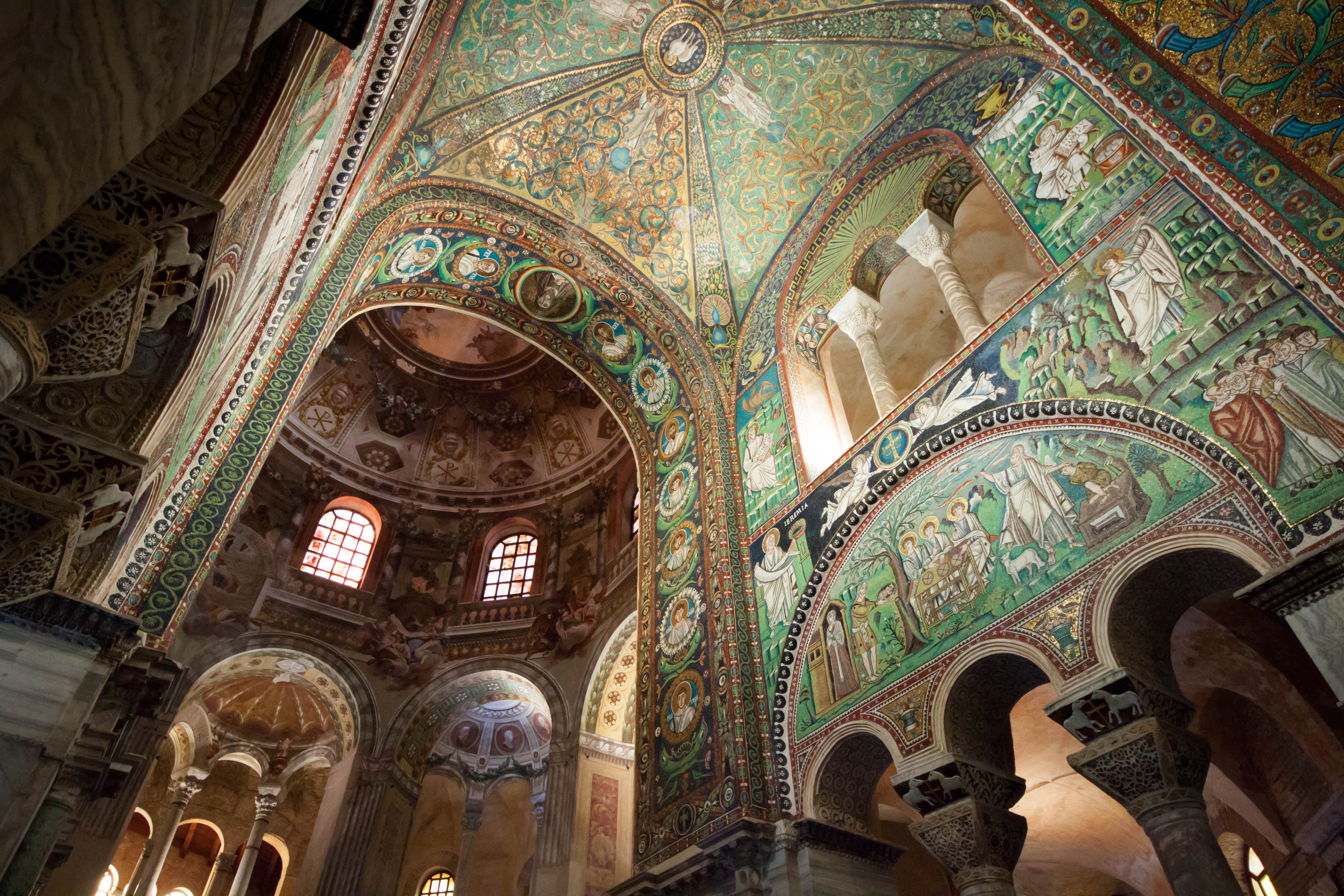
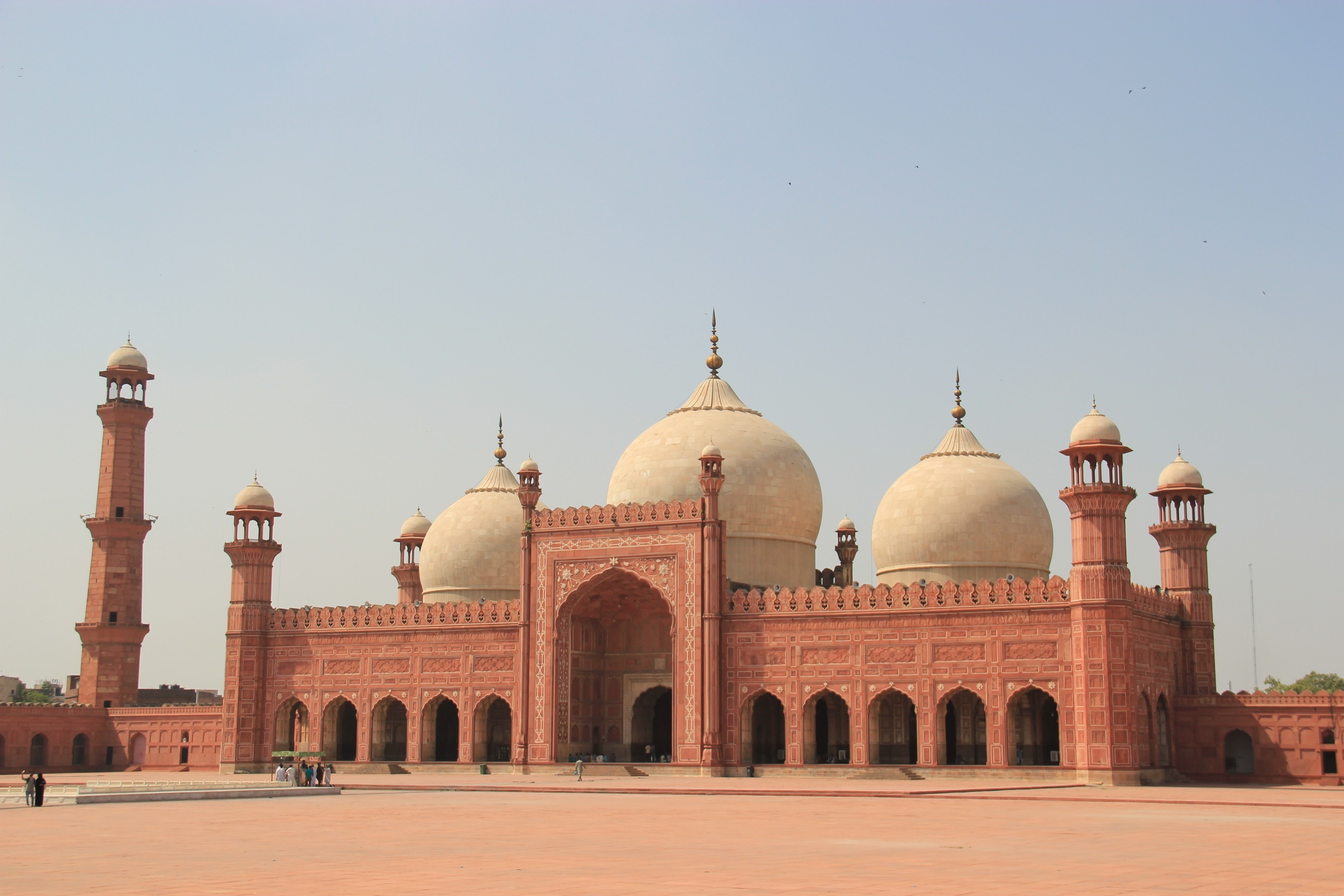
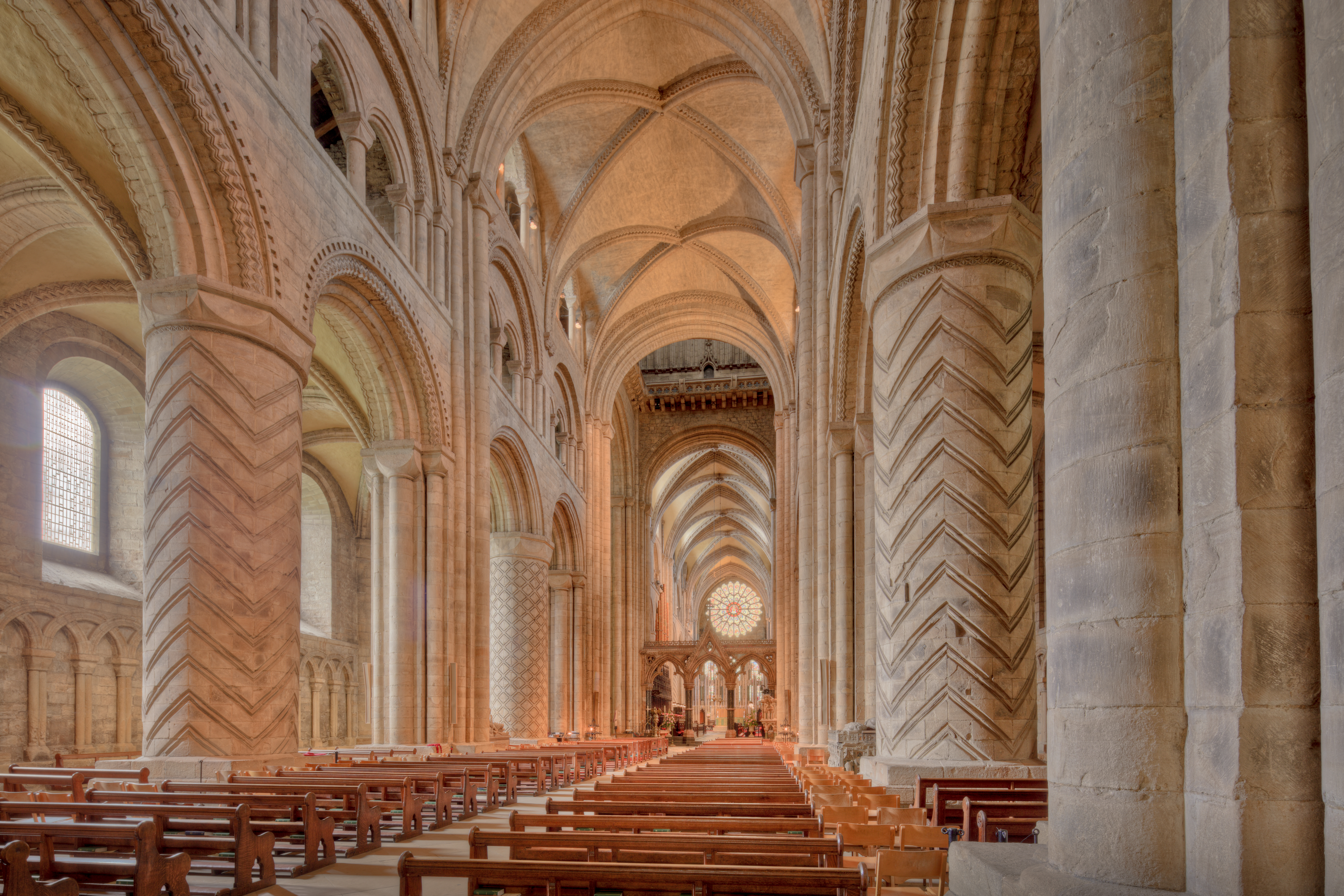
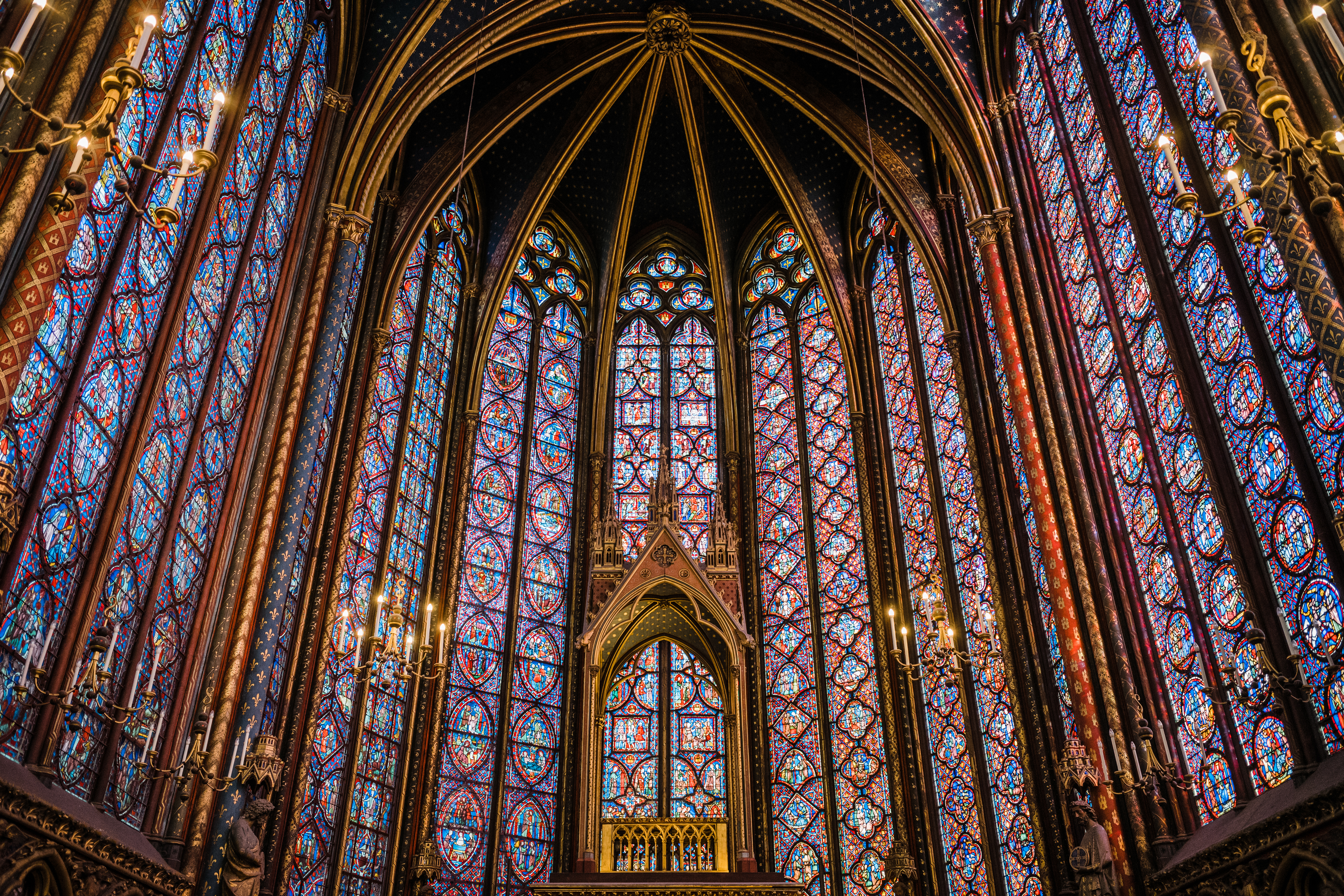
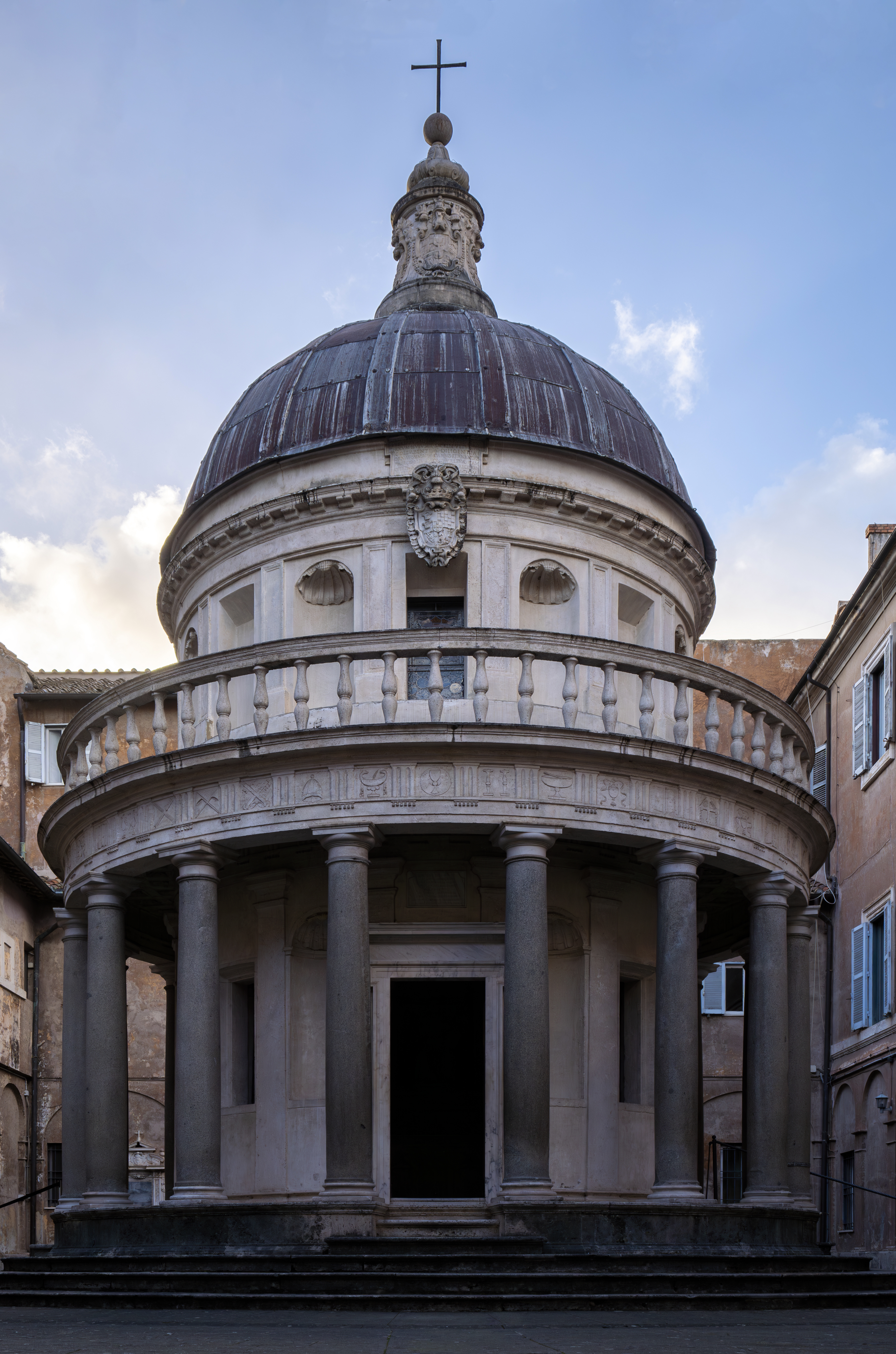
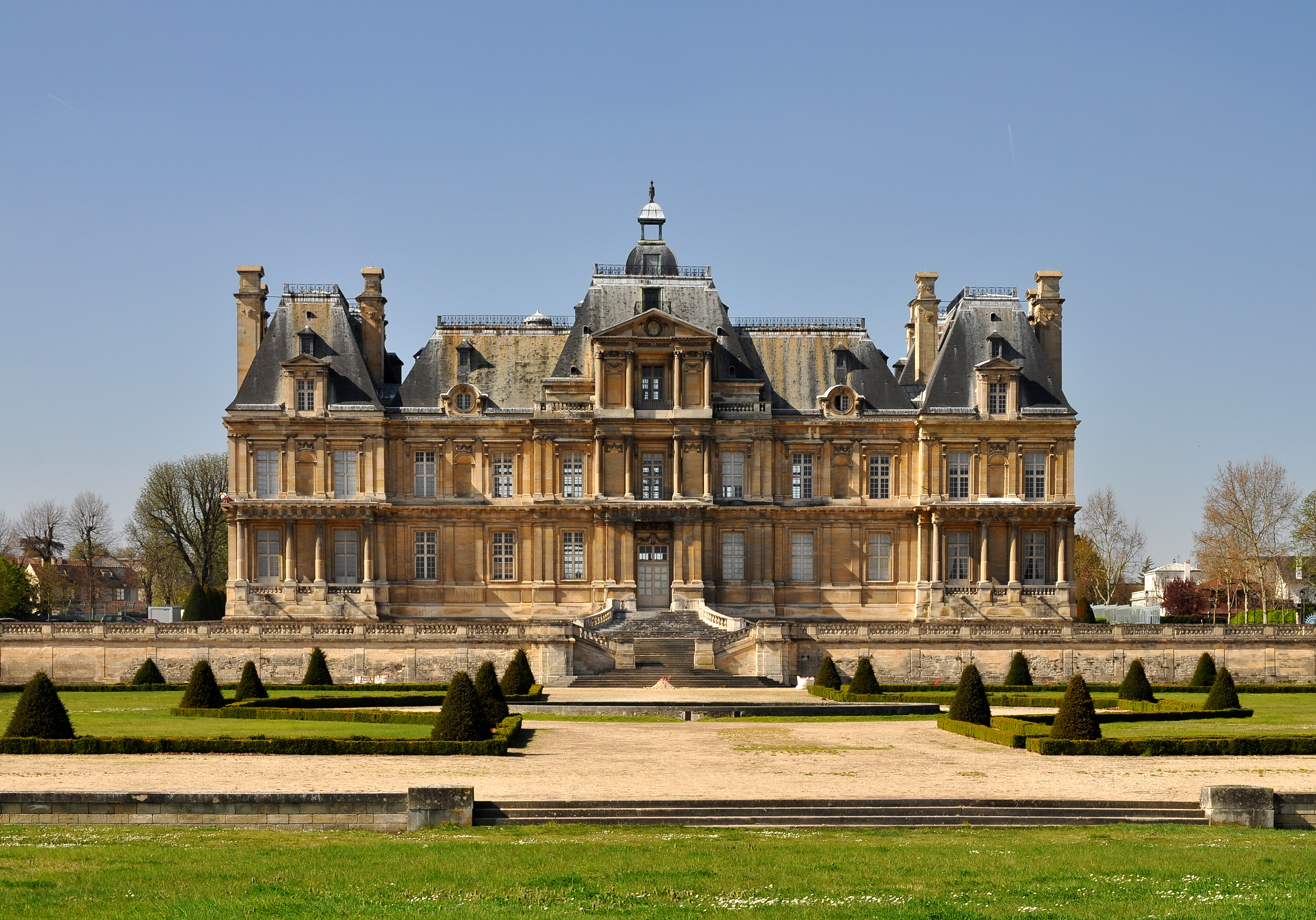
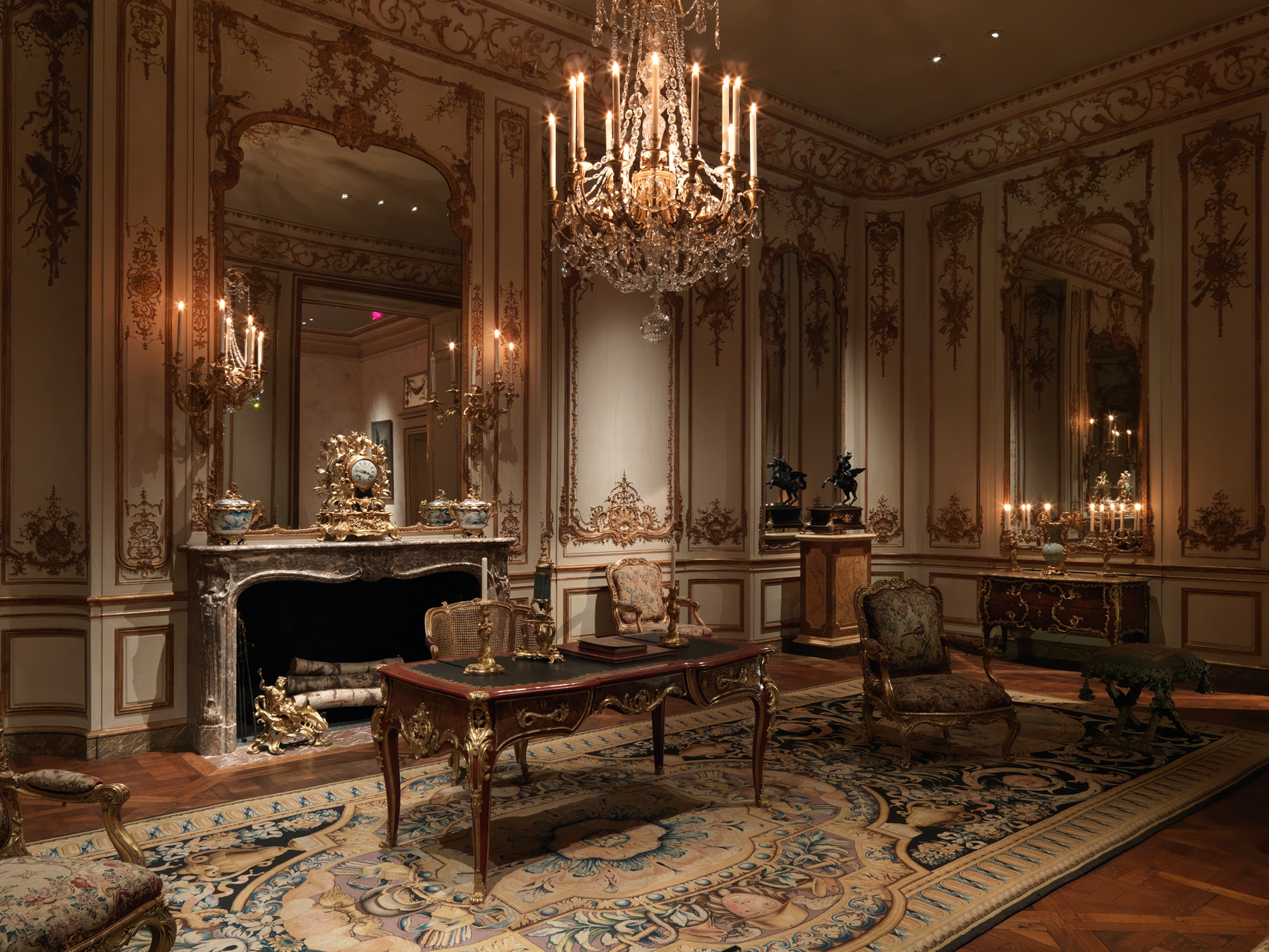
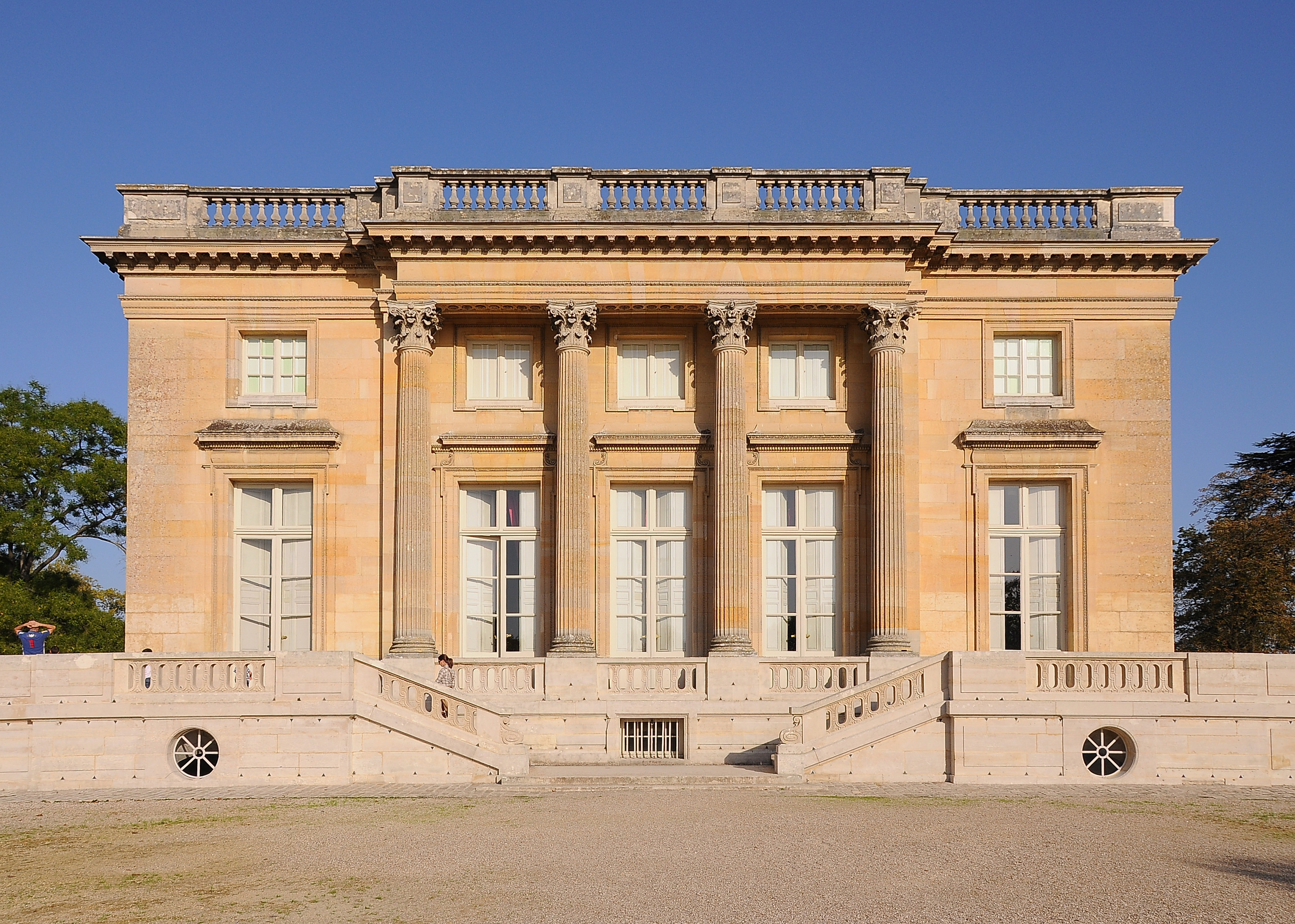
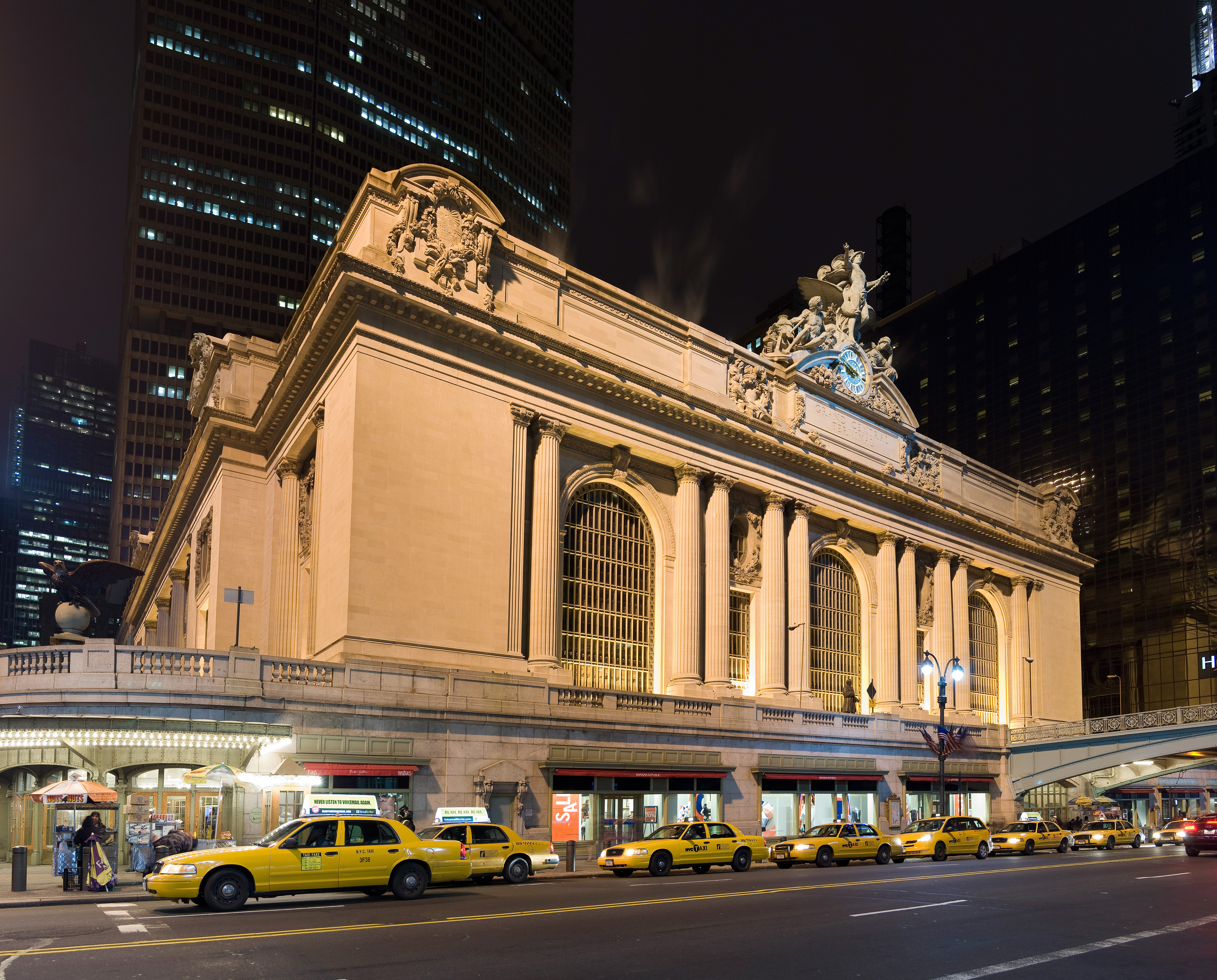
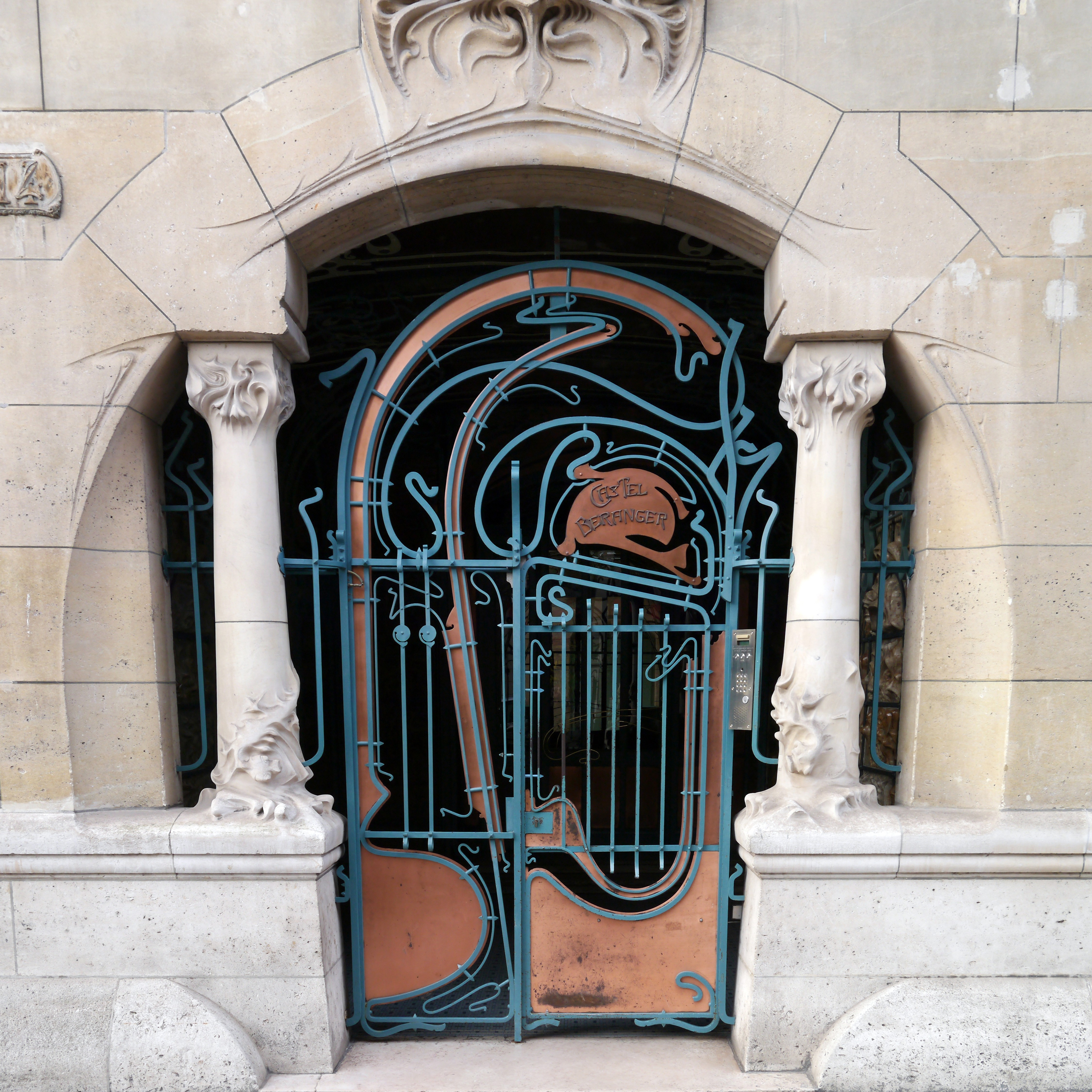
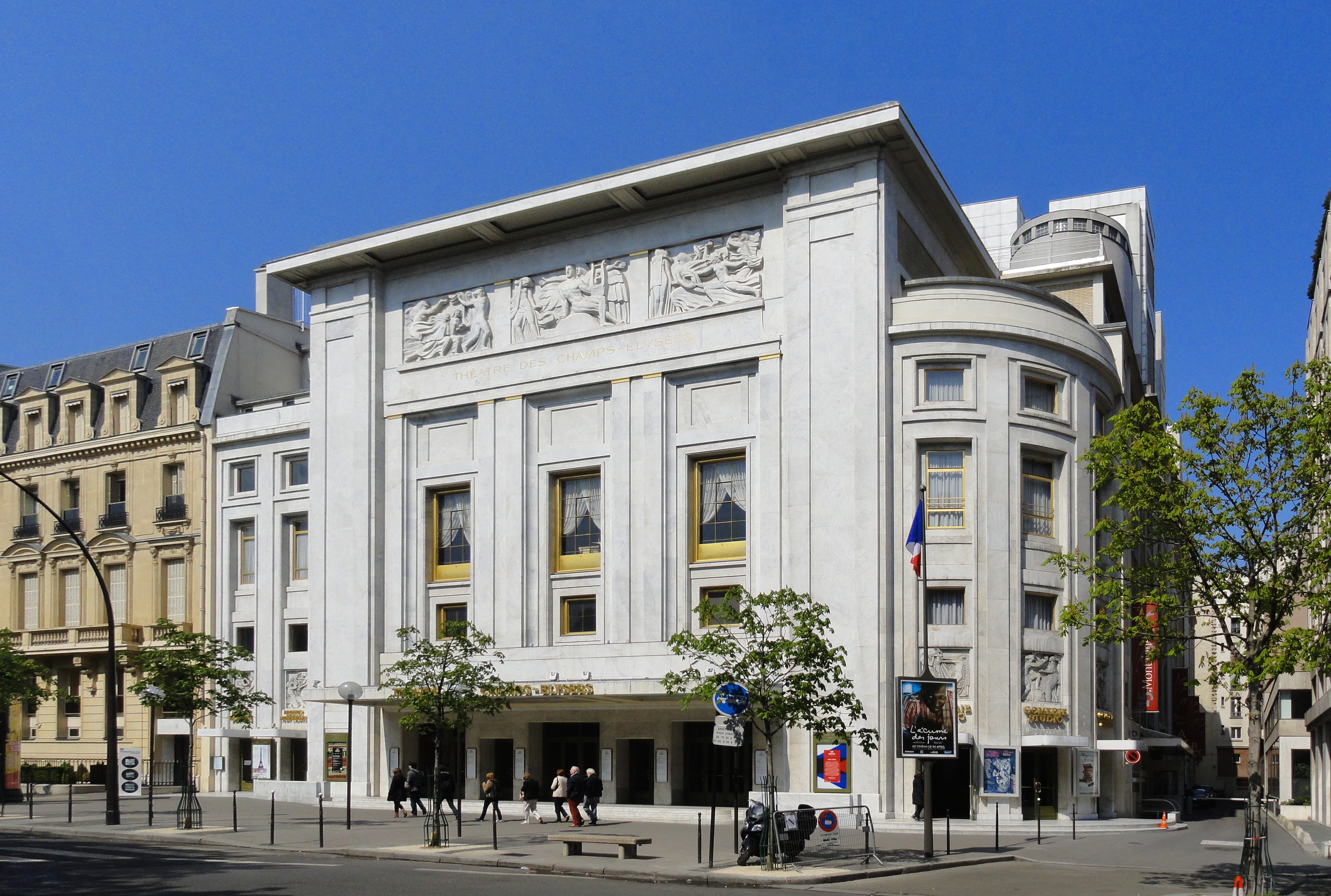
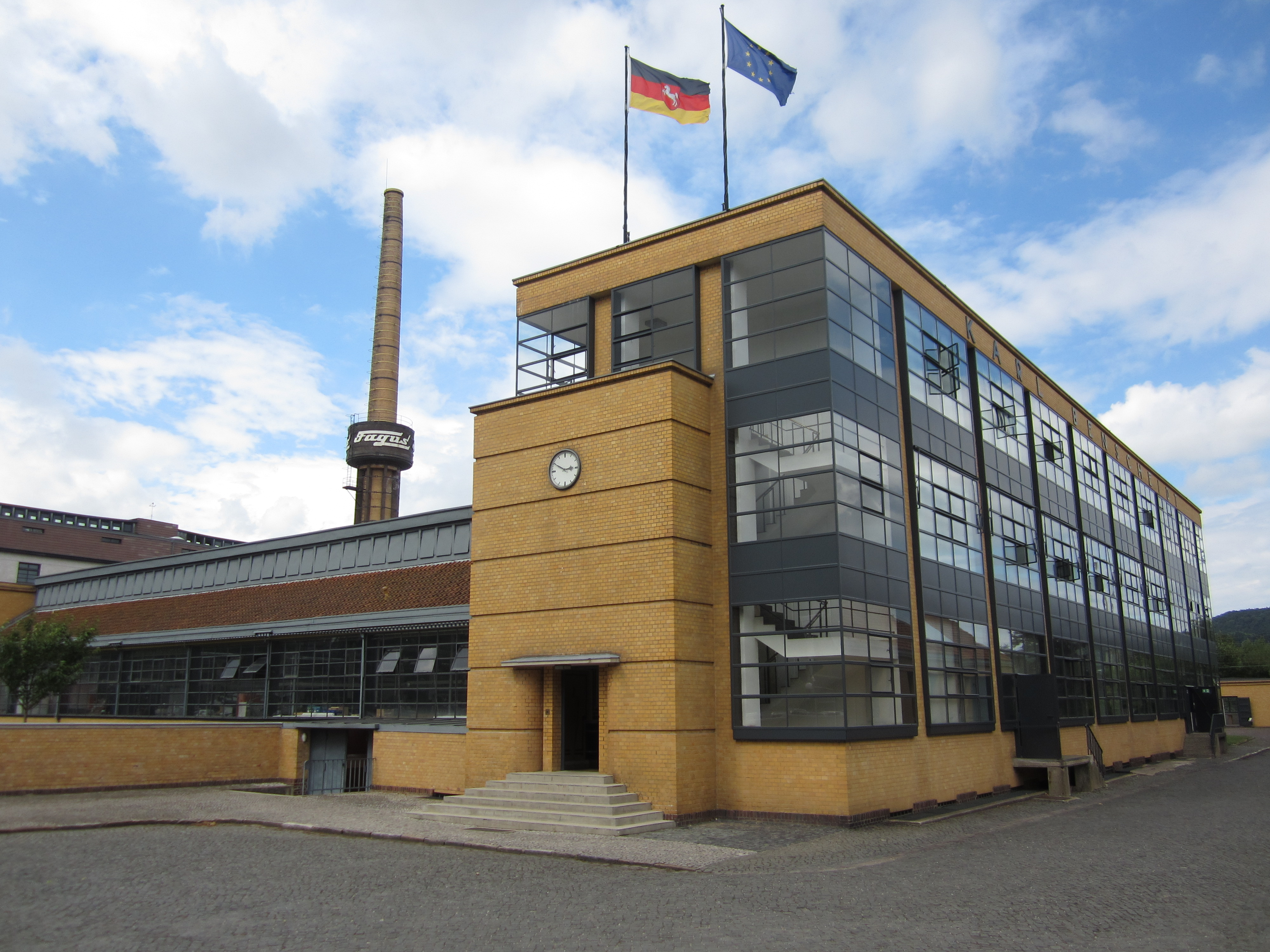
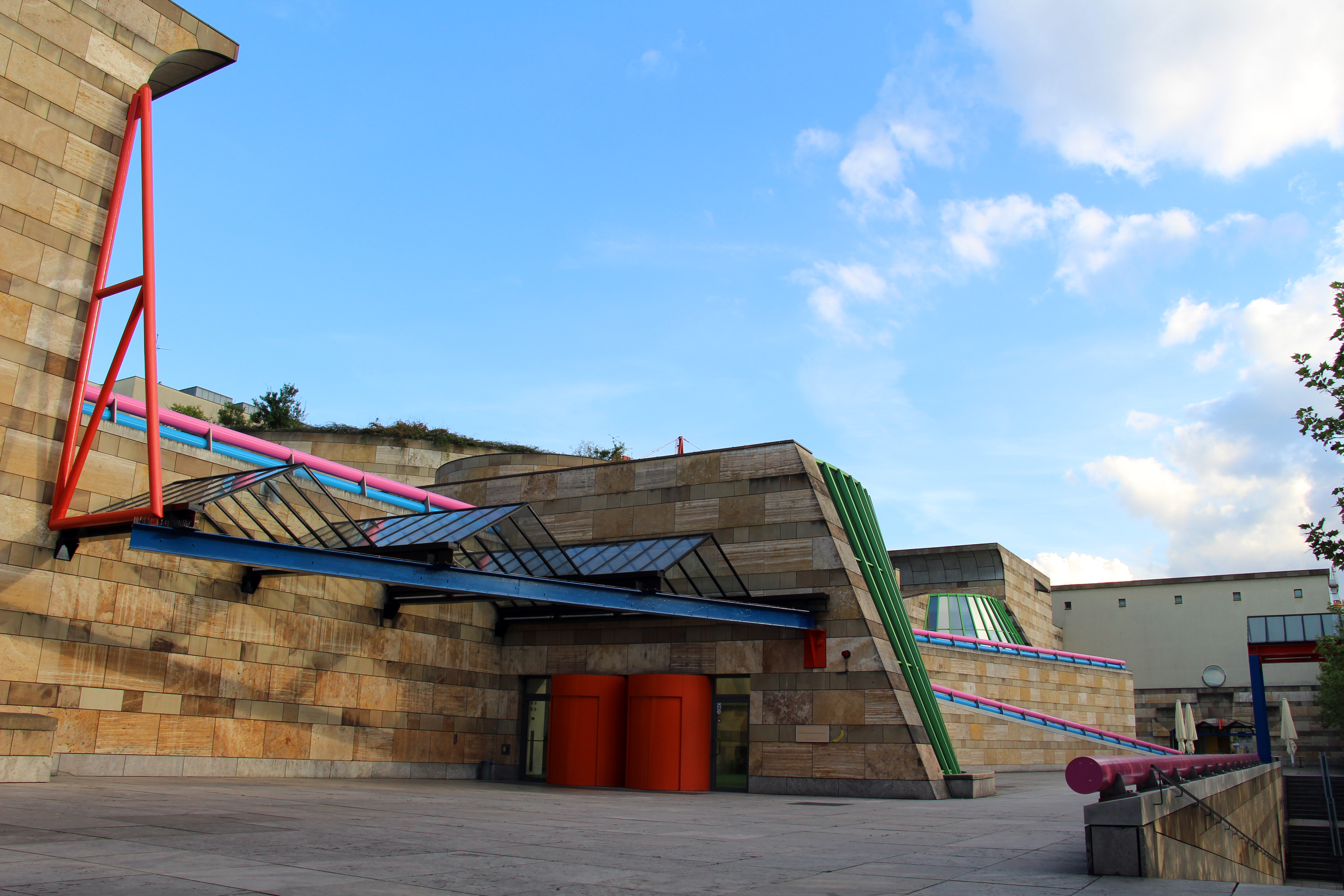
Short visual history of architectural styles (from left to right): the Ishtar Gate (Mesopotamian); the Temple of Isis from Philae (Ancient Egyptian); the Maison Carrée (Greco-Roman); the Kandariya Mahadeva Temple (Indian); the Hall of Prayer for Good Harvests of the Temple of Heaven (Chinese); the Basilica of San Vitale (Byzantine); Badshahi Mosque (Islamic); the Durham Cathedral (Romanesque); Sainte-Chapelle (Gothic); the Tempietto (Renaissance); Château de Maisons (Baroque); boiserie from the Hôtel de Varengeville (Rococo); the Petit Trianon (Neoclassical); Grand Central Terminal, Midtown Manhattan, New York City (Beaux-Arts); the Castel Béranger (Art Nouveau); the Théâtre des Champs-Élysées (Art Deco); the Fagus Factory (Modern); and the Neue Staatsgalerie (Postmodern)

A building or edifice is an enclosed structure with a roof, walls and often windows, usually standing permanently in one place, such as a house or factory. Buildings come in a variety of sizes, shapes, and functions, and have been adapted throughout history in response to numerous factors, from available building materials to weather conditions, land prices, ground conditions, specific uses, prestige, and aesthetic reasons. To better understand the concept, see Nonbuilding structure for contrast.

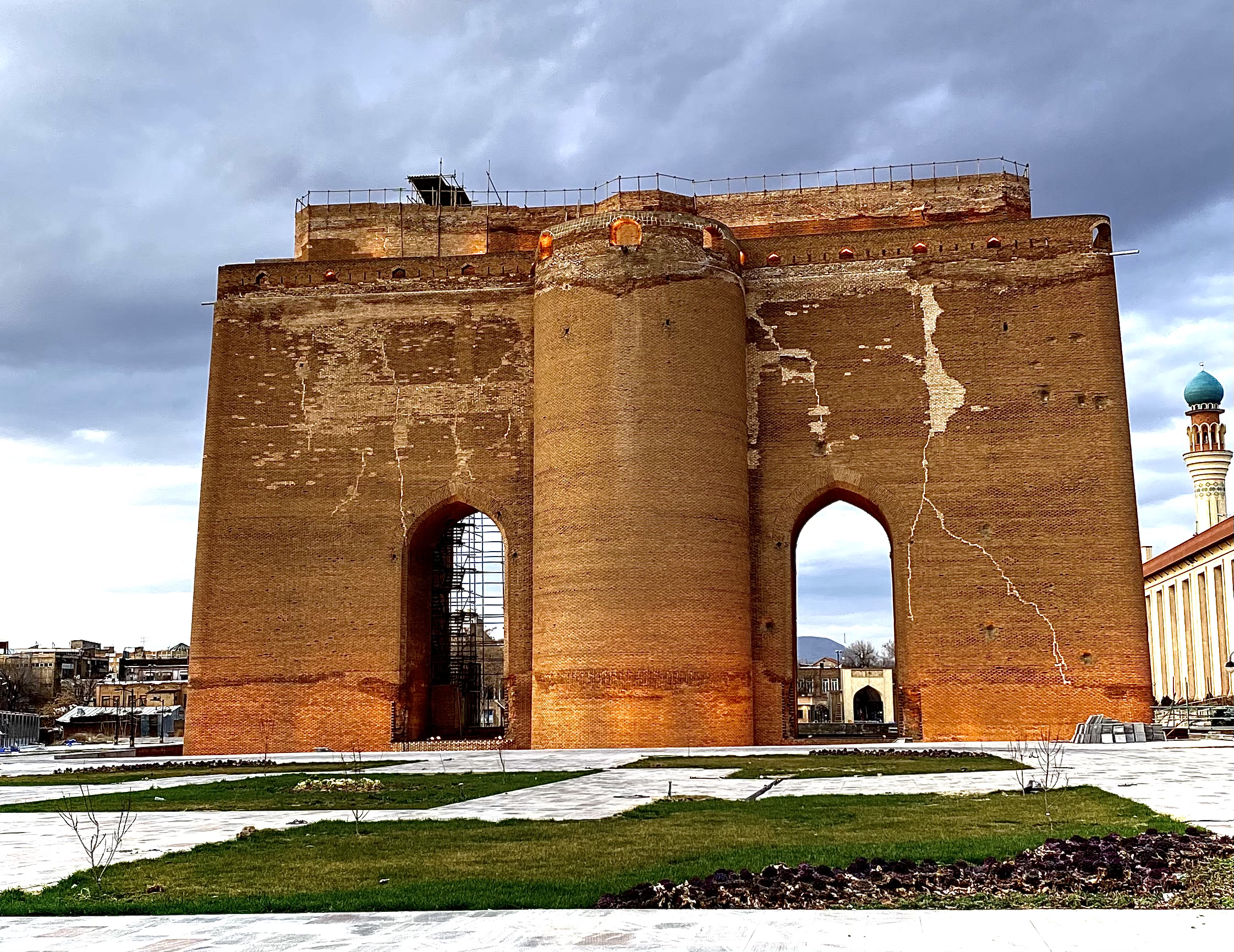
A historical building in Tabriz, Iran

Buildings serve several societal needs: occupancy, primarily as shelter from weather; security; living space; privacy; storage for belongings; and comfortable places to live and work. A building as a shelter represents a physical separation of the human habitat (a place of comfort and safety) from the outside (a place that may be harsh and harmful at times).

Buildings have been objects or canvasses of much artistic expression. In recent years, interest in sustainable planning and building practices has become an intentional part of the design process of many new buildings and other structures, usually green buildings.

== Definition ==
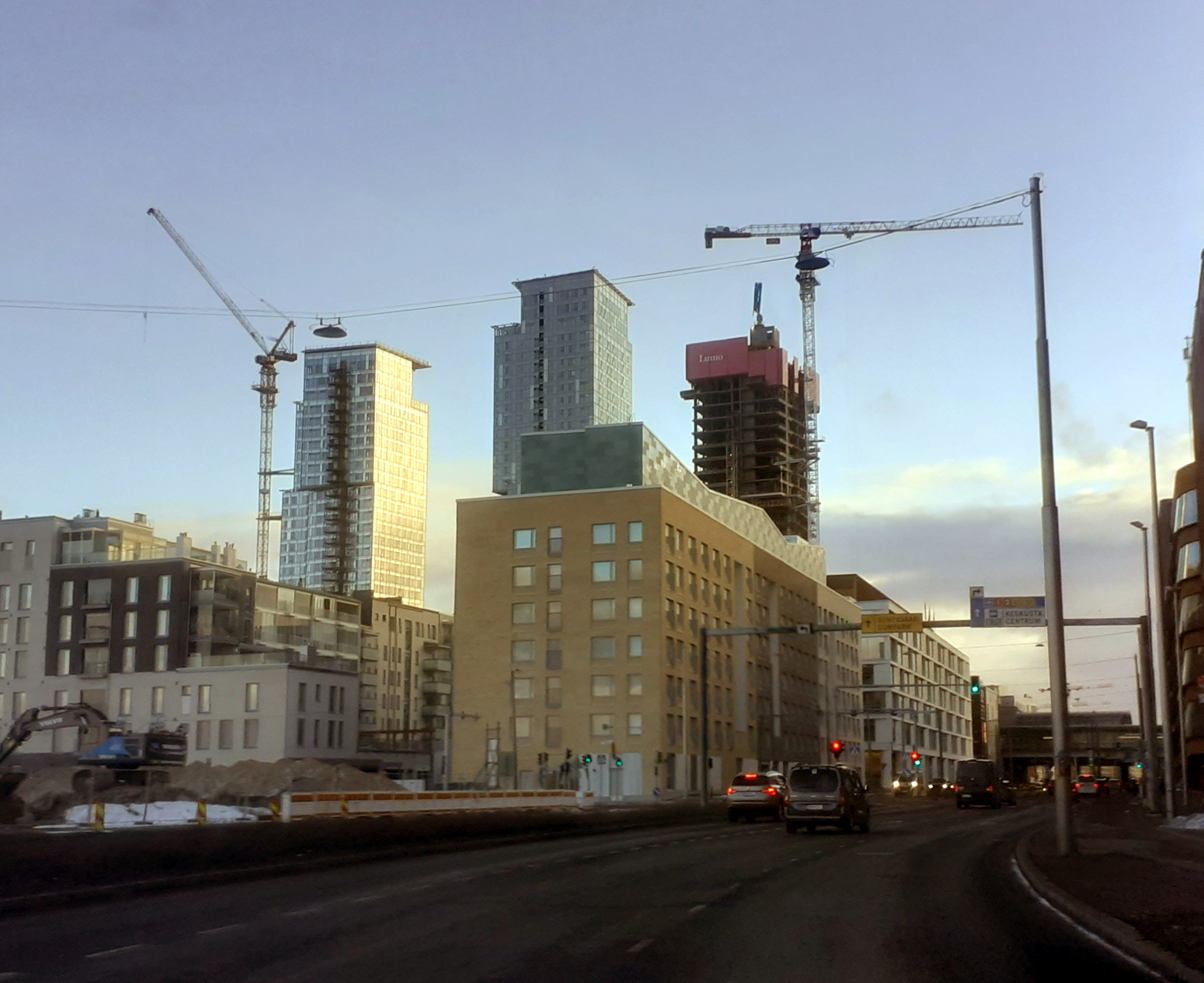
Skyscrapers under construction in Kalasatama, Helsinki, Finland (2021)

A building is 'a structure that has a roof and walls and stands more or less permanently in one place'; "there was a three-storey building on the corner"; "it was an imposing edifice". In the broadest interpretation a fence or wall is a building. However, the word structure is used more broadly than building, to include natural and human-made formations and ones that do not have walls; structure is more often used for a fence. Sturgis' Dictionary included that "[building] differs from architecture in excluding all idea of artistic treatment; and it differs from construction in the idea of excluding scientific or highly skillful treatment."

Structural height in technical usage is the height to the highest architectural detail on the building from street level. Spires and masts may or may not be included in this height, depending on how they are classified. Spires and masts used as antennas are not generally included. The distinction between a low-rise and high-rise building is a matter of debate, but generally three stories or less is considered low-rise.

== History ==
There is clear evidence of homebuilding from around 18,000 BC. Buildings became common during the Neolithic period.

== Types ==
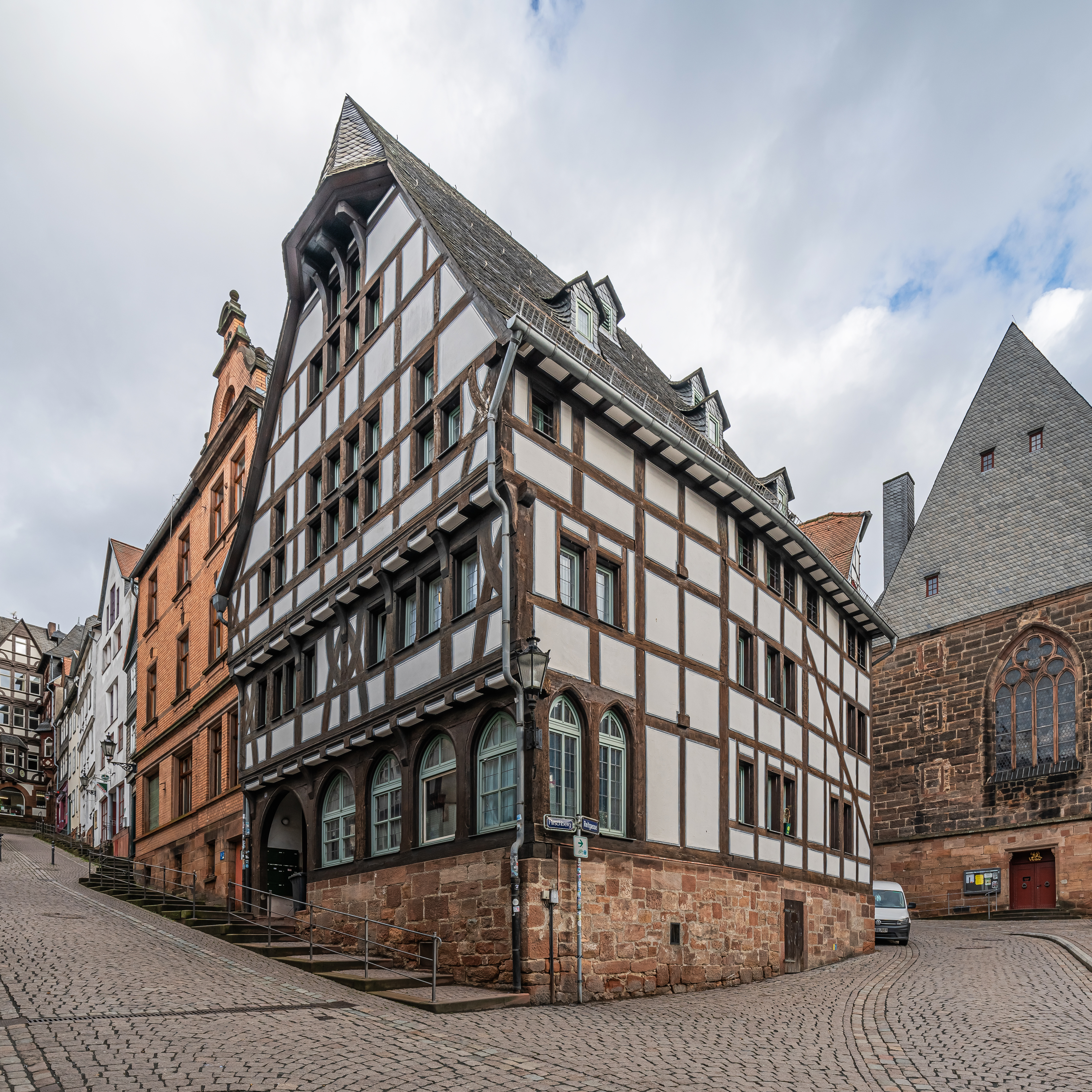
A timber-framed house in Marburg, Germany

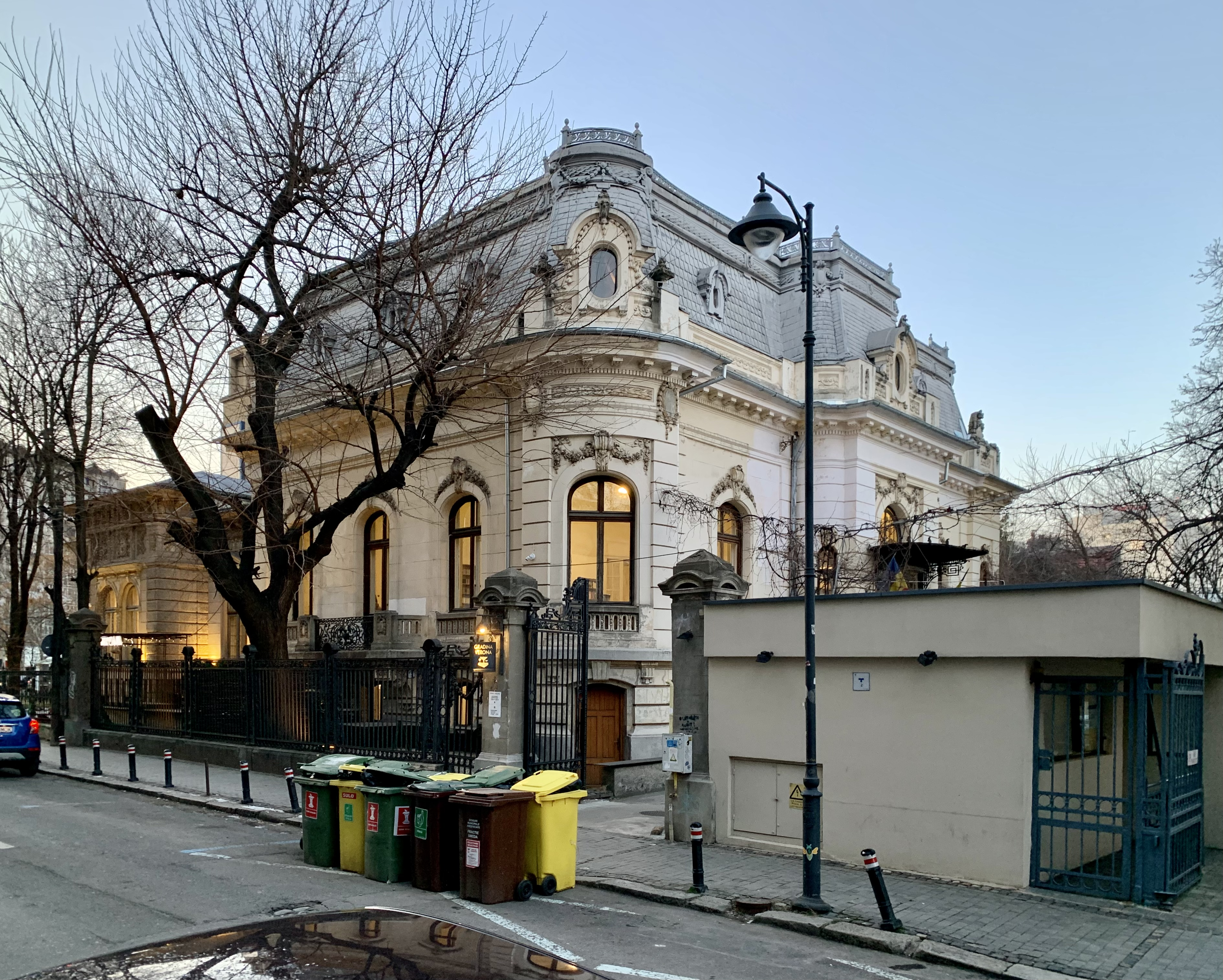
Belle Époque city-house on Strada Arthur Verona in Bucharest, Romania, currently part of a bookshop

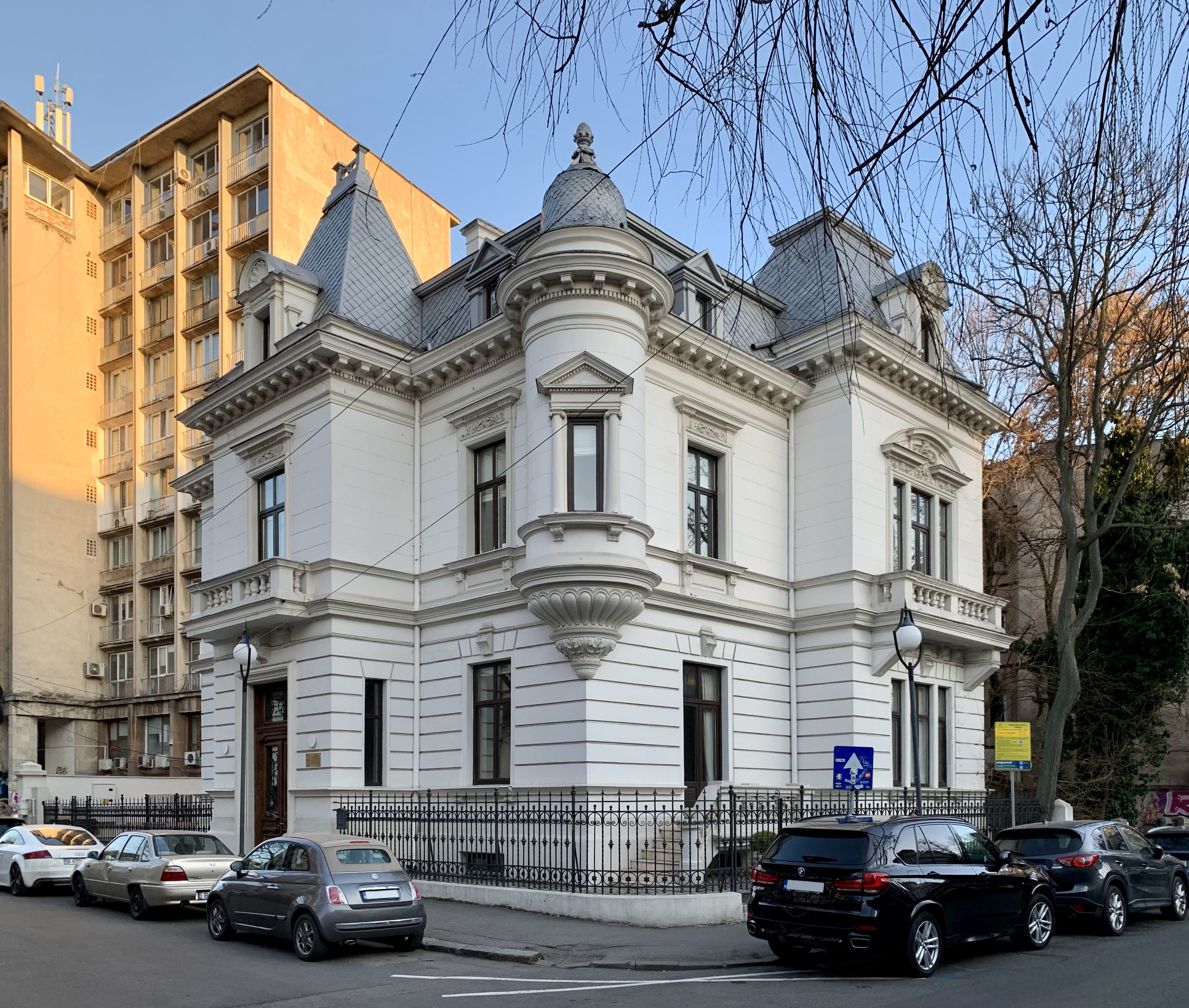
The Mitilineu House, a city-house in Bucharest, dating from 1898

=== Residential ===
Single-family residential buildings are most often called houses or homes. Multi-family residential buildings containing more than one dwelling unit are called duplexes or apartment buildings. Condominiums are apartments that occupants own rather than rent. Houses may be built in pairs (semi-detached) or in terraces, where all but two of the houses have others on either side. Apartments may be built around courtyards or as rectangular blocks surrounded by plots of ground. Houses built as single dwellings may later be divided into apartments or bedsitters, or converted to other uses (e.g., offices or shops). Hotels, especially of the extended-stay variety (apartels), can be classed as residential.

Building types may range from huts to multimillion-dollar high-rise apartment blocks able to house thousands of people. Increasing settlement density in buildings (and smaller distances between buildings) is usually a response to high ground prices resulting from the desire of many people to live close to their places of employment or similar attractors.

Terms for residential buildings reflect such characteristics as function (e.g., holiday cottage (vacation home) or timeshare if occupied seasonally); size (cottage or great house); value (shack or mansion); manner of construction (log home or mobile home); architectural style (castle or Victorian); and proximity to geographical features (earth shelter, stilt house, houseboat, or floating home). For residents in need of special care or those society considers dangerous enough to deprive of liberty, there are institutions (nursing homes, orphanages, psychiatric hospitals, and prisons) and group housing (barracks and dormitories).

Historically, many people lived in communal buildings called longhouses, smaller dwellings called pit-houses, and houses combined with barns, sometimes called housebarns.

Common building materials include brick, concrete, stone, and combinations thereof. Buildings are defined to be substantial, permanent structures. Such forms as yurts and motorhomes are therefore considered dwellings but not buildings.

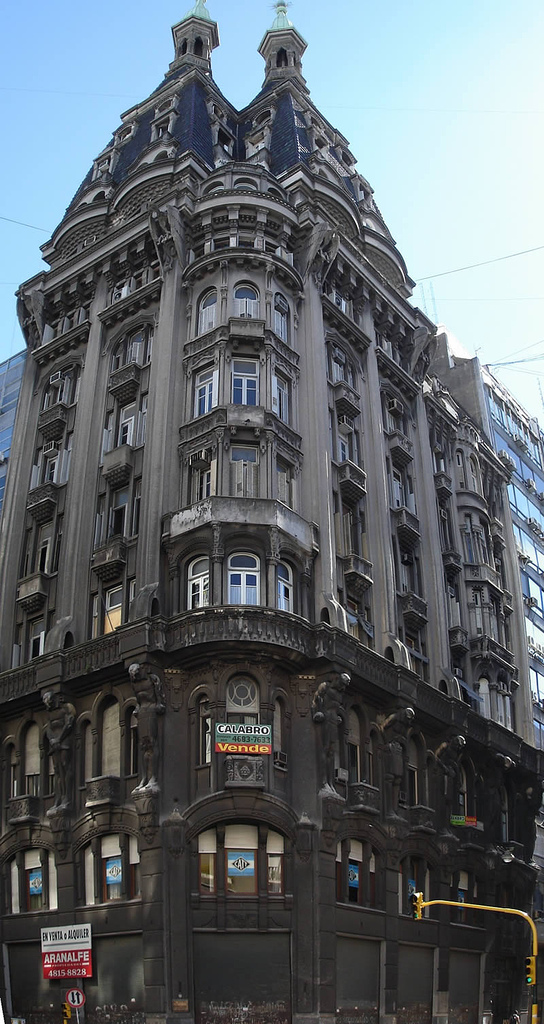
Otto Wulff office building in Buenos Aires, Argentina

=== Commercial ===
A commercial building is one in which at least one business is based and people do not live. Examples include stores, restaurant, and hotels.

=== Industrial ===
Industrial buildings are those in which heavy industry is done, such as manufacturing. These edifices include warehouses and factories.

=== Agricultural ===
Agricultural buildings are the outbuildings, such as barns located on farms.

=== Mixed use ===
Some buildings incorporate several or multiple different uses, most commonly commercial and residential.

=== Complex ===
Aluminum panel framed steel building in Korea

Sometimes a group of interrelated (and possibly inter-connected) builds are referred to as a complex – for example, a housing complex, educational complex, hospital complex, etc.

== Creation ==
The practice of designing, constructing, and operating buildings is generally a collective effort of different groups of professionals and trades. Depending on the size, complexity, and purpose of a particular building project, the project team may include:

- A real estate developer who secures funding for the project;
- One or more financial institutions or other investors that provide the funding;
- Local planning and code authorities;
- A surveyor who performs an ALTA/ACSM and construction surveys throughout the project;
- Construction managers who coordinate the effort of different groups of project participants;
- Licensed architects and engineers who provide building design and prepare construction documents;
- The principal design engineering disciplines which normally include the following professionals: civil, structural, mechanical engineers, building services, HVAC (Heating, Ventilation and Air Conditioning), plumbing and drainage. Other design engineer specialists may also be involved such as fire prevention, acoustic, façade engineers, building physics, Telecoms, AV (Audio Visual), BMS (Building Management Systems) Automatic controls etc. These design engineers also prepare construction documents which are issued to specialist contractors to obtain a price for the works and to follow for the installations.
- Landscape architects;
- Interior designers;
- Other consultants;
- Contractors who provide construction services and install building systems such as climate control, electrical, plumbing, decoration, fire protection, security and telecommunications;
- Marketing or leasing agents;
- Facility managers who are responsible for operating the building.

Buildings are typically subject to planning and building regulations depending on their jurisdiction, including zoning ordinances, building codes, and other regulations such as fire codes, life safety codes, and related standards.

Vehicles—such as trailers, caravans, ships, and passenger aircraft—are treated as "buildings" for life safety purposes.

=== Ownership and funding ===
- Mortgage loan
- Real estate developer

== Environmental impacts ==
Buildings represent a large part of energy, electricity, water, and materials consumption. As of 2020, they account for 37% of global energy use and energy-related CO_{2} emissions, which the United Nations estimates contributed to 33% of overall worldwide emissions. Including the manufacturing of building materials, the global CO_{2} emissions were 39%. If new technologies in construction are not adopted during this time of rapid growth, emissions could double by 2050, according to the United Nations Environment Program.

Glass buildings, especially all-glass skyscrapers, contribute significantly to climate change due to their energy inefficiency. While these structures are visually appealing and allow abundant natural light, they also trap heat, necessitating increased use of air conditioning systems, which contributes to higher carbon emissions. Experts advocate for design modifications and potential restrictions on all-glass edifices to mitigate their detrimental environmental impact.

Buildings account for a large amount of land. According to the National Resources Inventory, approximately 107 million acres (430,000 km^{2}) of land in the United States are developed. The International Energy Agency released a publication that estimated that existing buildings are responsible for more than 40% of the world's total primary energy consumption and for 24% of global carbon dioxide emissions.

== Building services ==
=== Physical plant ===
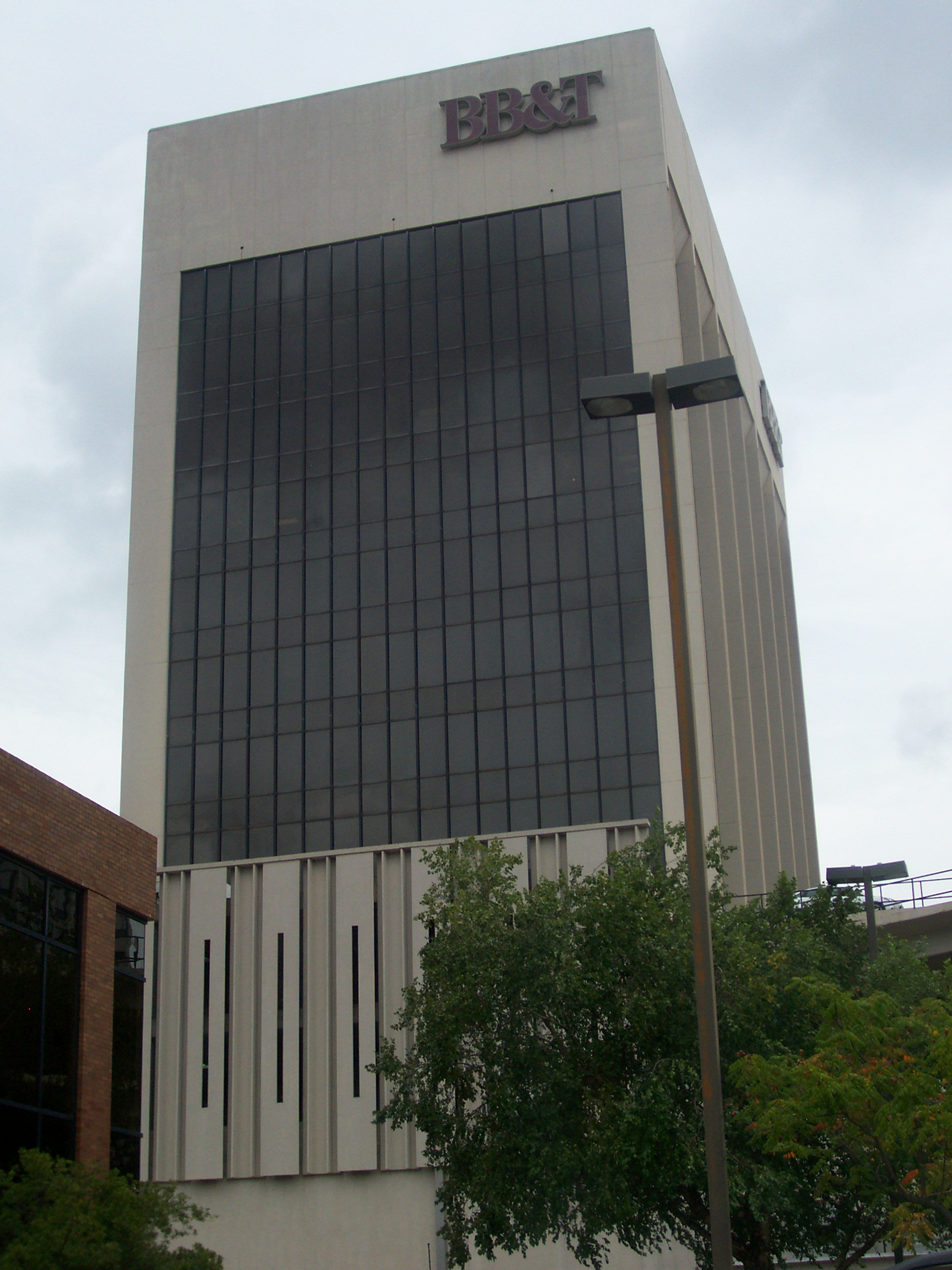
The BB&T Building in Macon, Georgia is constructed of aluminum.

Any building requires a certain general amount of internal infrastructure to function, which includes such elements like heating / cooling, power and telecommunications, water and wastewater etc. Especially in commercial buildings (such as offices or factories), these can be extremely intricate systems taking up large amounts of space (sometimes located in separate areas or double floors / false ceilings) and constitute a big part of the regular maintenance required.

=== Conveying systems ===
Systems for transport of people within buildings:

- Elevator
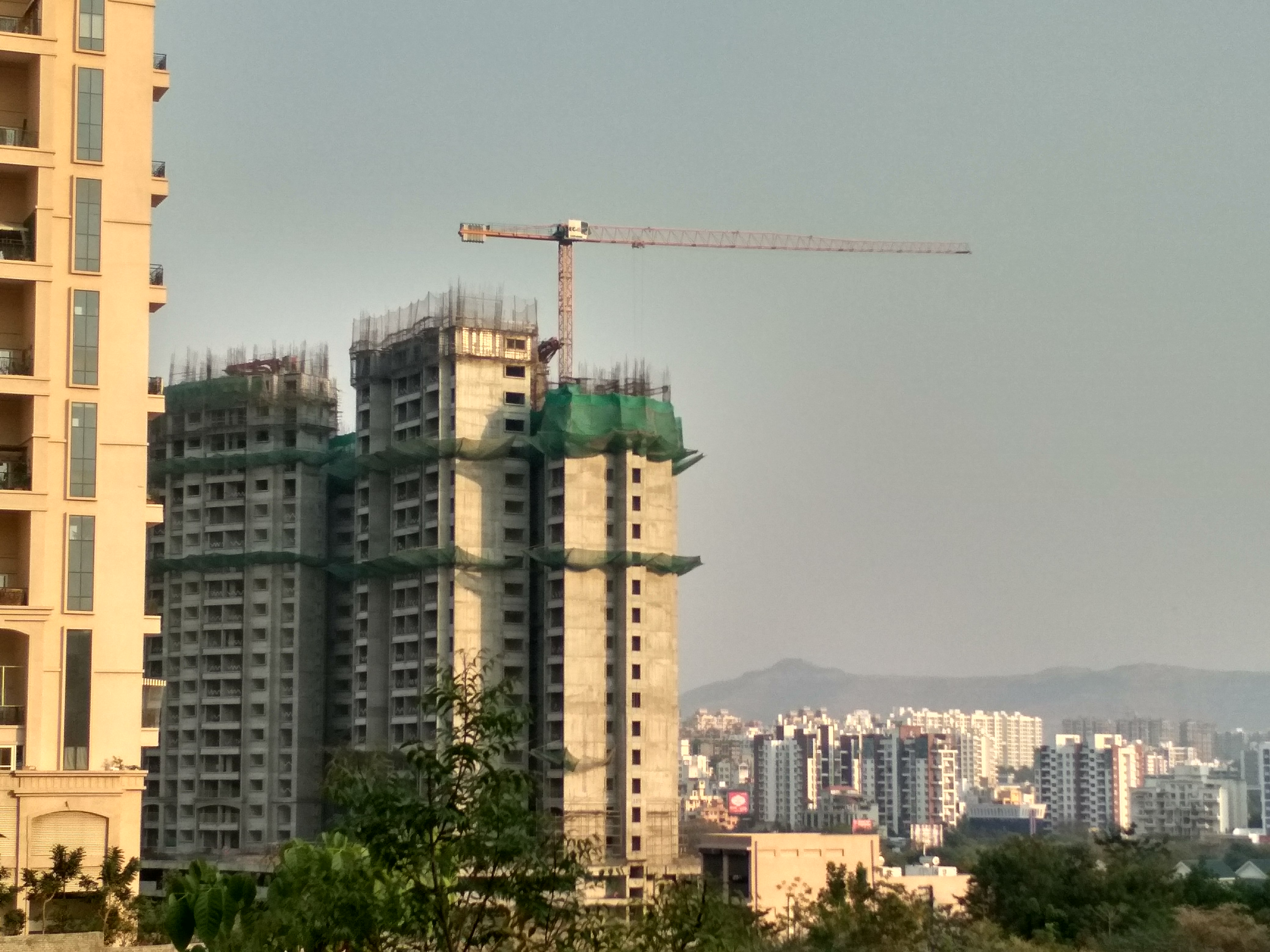
  An under construction building in Pune, India. It is a high rise building, located in the South-Eastern Part of the city. In an area commonly known as 'Nine Hills'.
- Escalator
- Moving sidewalk (horizontal and inclined)

Systems for transport of people between interconnected buildings:

- Skyway
- Underground city

== Building damage ==
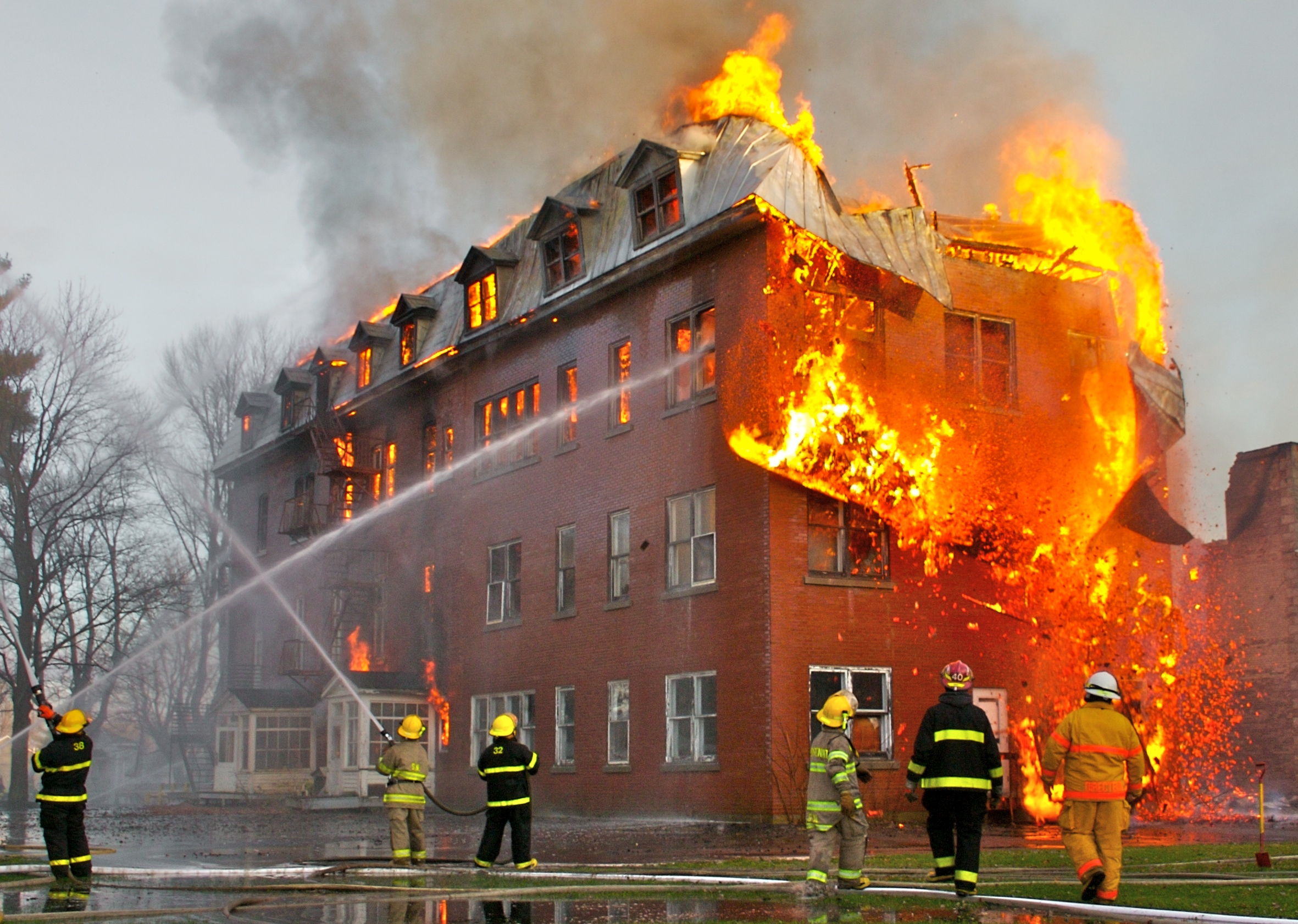
A building in Massueville (Quebec, Canada) engulfed by fire

Buildings may be damaged during construction or during maintenance. They may be damaged by accidents involving storms, explosions, subsidence caused by mining, water withdrawal or poor foundations and landslides. Buildings may suffer fire damage and flooding. They may become dilapidated through lack of proper maintenance, or alteration work improperly carried out.

== See also ==
- Autonomous building
- Commercial modular construction
- Earthquake engineering
- Float glass
- Hurricane-proof building
- List of largest buildings
- List of tallest buildings
- Lists of buildings and structures
- List of building materials
- Natural building
- Natural disaster and earthquake
- Skyscraper
- Steel building
- Tent
