= National Resources Inventory =

The National Resources Inventory (NRI) is a periodic assessment of the status and changing conditions of the soil, water, and related resources on private land conducted by USDA’s Natural Resources Conservation Service (NRCS). The survey has been conducted at 5-year intervals since 1977, most recently in 2017. NRCS released initial results from the 1997 survey in late 1999. Each updated report includes comparison of the data relative to 1982.

Summary pages exist for soil erosion, land use status and trends, development of non-federal rural land, and rangeland.
