= Commercial modular construction =

Non-residential structures that are mostly built offsite

Commercial Modular Buildings are code-compliant, non-residential structures that are 60% to 90% completed offsite in a factory-controlled environment. They are then transported or shipped to a final destination where the modules are then erected onto a concrete foundation to form a finished building. The word "modular" does not describe a building type or style; it simply describes a means of construction.

The commercial modular construction industry comprises two distinct divisions:

Permanent Modular Construction (PMC) – modular units built offsite for assembly onsite to create a permanent facility not intended to be relocated. They are comparable to buildings built strictly onsite in terms of quality, life span, and materials used for construction.

Relocatable Buildings – modular units built offsite for assembly onsite that can be partially or completely reused and relocated at future building sites.

== Benefits ==
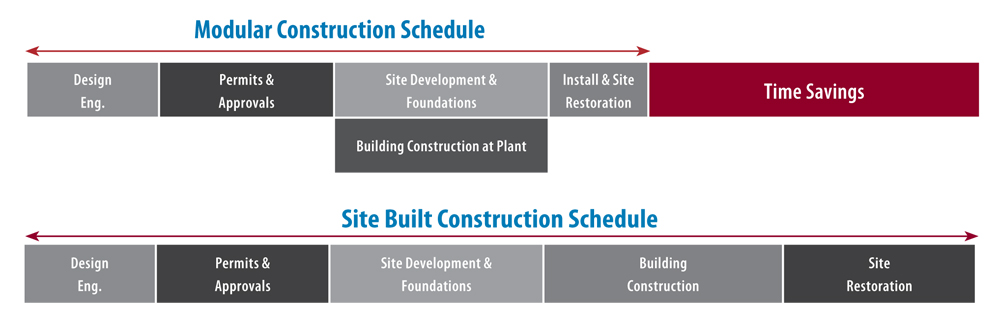
Simultaneous site development and construction at the plant reduces the schedule up to 50%

A primary benefit of modular construction is its fast delivery. Due to the simultaneous process of creating modules in a factory at the same time site work is occurring, modular buildings can be constructed in up to half the time as buildings built completely onsite. This allows the buildings to be occupied sooner and allows owners to see a faster return on investment.

So modular construction has the potential to shorten project design and engineering time and improve construction productivity. The installation of modular buildings is cost-effective, safe and environmentally friendly. The introduction of modular prefabricated units is not only possible in low-rise construction but also in multi-story and high-rise construction.

To save the most time and money and maximize the efficiency of the modular construction process, it must be implemented at the beginning of the design-build process.

Other advantages of modular construction are design customization and sustainability. The latter is a factor that stands out in the use of modular construction in reference to corporate social responsibility, both in relation to waste minimization, the use of renewable energy and the use of sustainable building materials (such as bamboo and recycled steel and wood) that reduce environmental pollution. Given that the construction sector is one of the planet's main carbon emitters, these are aspects that are increasingly in demand by those in charge of construction projects, as well as by architects and designers.

According to the UK group WRAP, (Waste and Resources Action Programme) up to a 90% reduction in materials can be achieved through the use of modular construction. Materials minimized include: wood pallets, shrink wrap, cardboard, plasterboard, timber, concrete, bricks, and cement.

== Uses ==
Modular builders provide all types of building space, from small temporary units to complex, multi-story permanent buildings. The most commonly served markets are education, healthcare, general office, retail and commercial housing.

Some common industrial uses may include: Application Rooms, Laser Rooms, Equipment Enclosures, Environmental Rooms, Maintenance Rooms, or Storage and Security Rooms. Commercial applications may include Offices, Reception Areas, Conference and Meeting Rooms, Copy Centers and Mail Rooms, Shipping and Receiving Rooms, Lunch Rooms and Cafeterias, Break Rooms, Dark Rooms, Training Rooms, and Storage Rooms.

== Modular Architecture ==
The use of modular architecture, especially in large-scale facilities such as hotels or shopping malls, allows for a high-quality building result with excellent value for money. Within modular architecture the use of building information models and the use of 3D modeling design technology makes it easy to take full advantage of the benefits of commercial modular construction. This is in addition to the automation of factory processes with the use of robotic fabrication which provides a result that is perfectly adapted to the needs and requirements of each project.

== See also ==
- Autonomous building – Building designed to be independent from public infrastructure
- Modular building – Prefabricated building or house that consists of repeated sections
- Relocatable buildings
- Prefabricated building – Building constructed using prefabrication
- Building – Enclosed structure
