= Steel building =

Overview of steel in construction

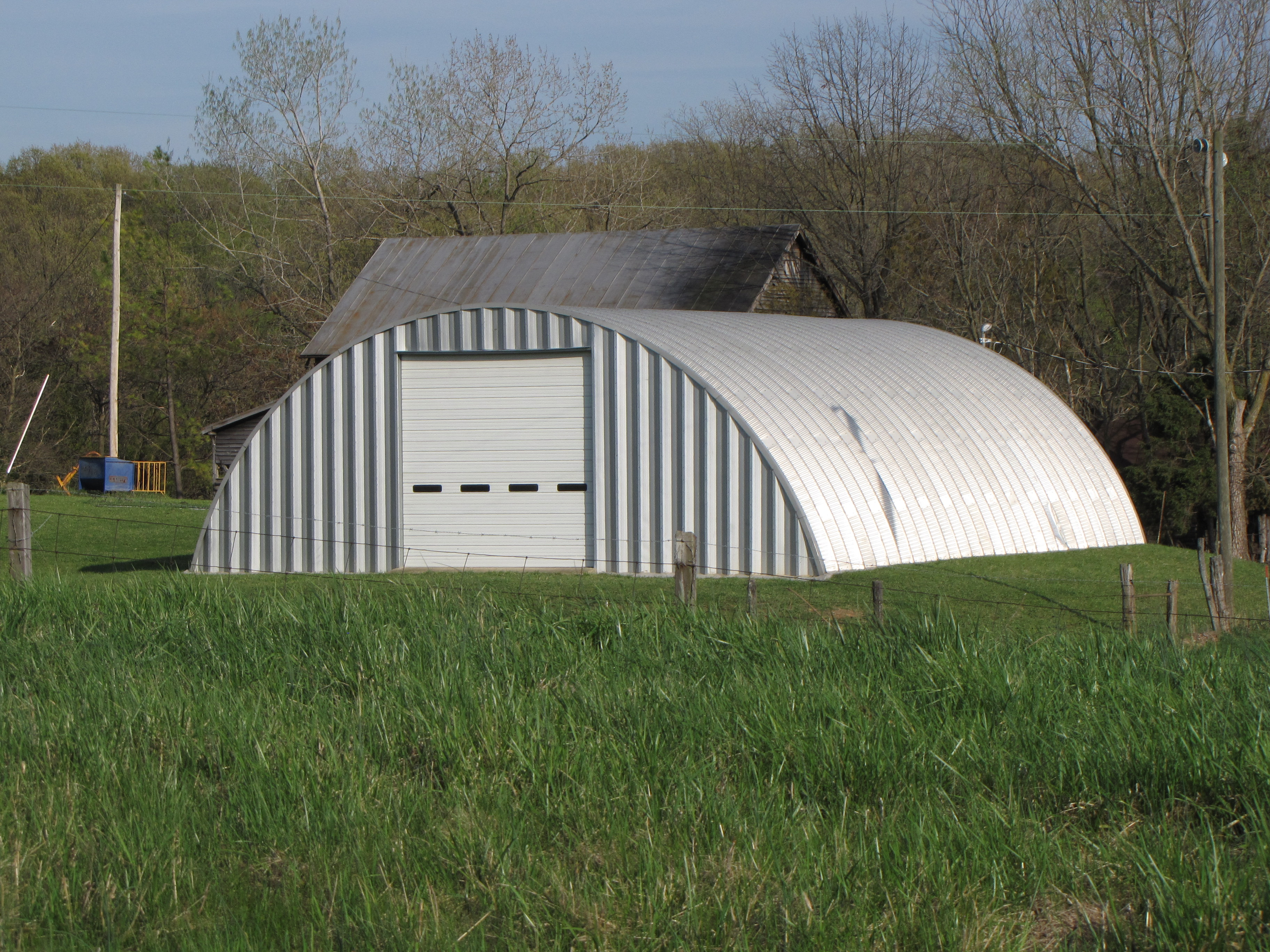
Steel building on a farm in Shenandoah County, Virginia

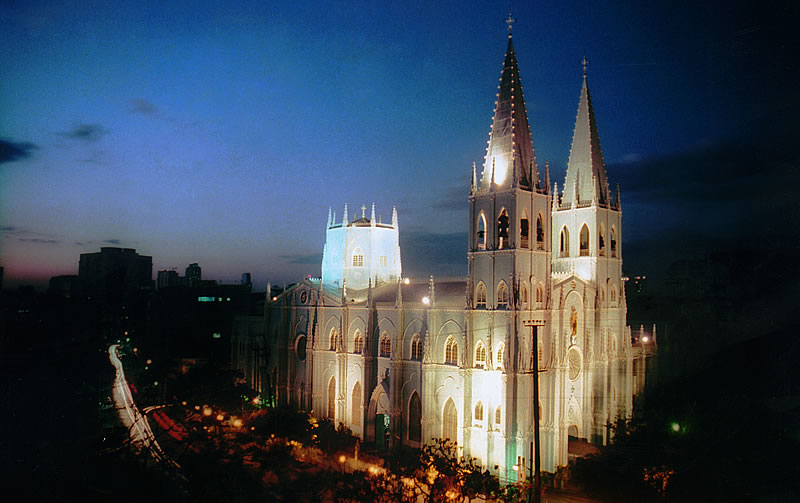
The Minor Basilica of San Sebastián (1891) in Manila, a Philippines National Heritage Landmark.

A steel building is a metal structure fabricated with steel for the internal support and for exterior cladding, as opposed to steel framed buildings which generally use other materials for floors, walls, and external envelope. Steel buildings are used for a variety of purposes including storage, work spaces and living accommodation. They are classified into specific types depending on how they are used.

== Advantages ==
Steel provides several advantages over other building materials, such as wood:

- Steel is structurally sound and manufactured to strict specifications and tolerances.
- Steel does not easily warp, buckle, twist or bend, and is therefore easy to modify and offers design flexibility. Steel is also easy to install.
- Steel is cost effective and rarely fluctuates in price.
- Steel allows for improved quality of construction and less maintenance.
- With the propagation of mold and mildew in residential building, using steel minimizes these infestations. Mold needs moist, porous material to grow. Steel studs do not have those problems.

== Disadvantages ==
- Heat conductivity: Calculations show that the web of an 18-gauge steel stud is about 31 times thinner than a "two-by" wood stud; however, steel conducts heat 310 times more efficiently than wood. As a net result, a "two-by" steel stud will conduct 10 times more heat than a "two-by" wood stud.
- Corrosion: Faulty design leads to the corrosion of iron and steel in buildings, leading to partial collapse.
- Can bend in fires.

== Types ==
Some common types of steel buildings are "straight-walled" and "arch," or Nissen or Quonset hut. Further, the structural type may be classed as clear span or multiple span. A clear span building does not have structural supports (e.g. columns) in the interior occupied space.

Straight-walled and arch type refer to the outside shape of the building. More generally, these are both structural arch forms if they rely on a rigid frame structure. However, curved roof structures are typically associated with the arch term.

Steel arch buildings may be cost efficient for specific applications. They are commonly used in the agricultural industry. Straight-walled buildings provide more usable space when compared to arch buildings. They are also easier to blend into existing architecture. Straight-walled buildings are commonly used for commercial, industrial, and many other occupancy types.

Clear span refers to the internal construction. Clear span steel buildings utilize large overhead support beams, thus reducing the need for internal supporting columns. Clear span steel buildings tend to be less cost efficient than structures with interior columns. However, other practical considerations may influence the selection of framing style such as an occupancy where interior structural obstructions are undesirable (e.g. aircraft hangars or sport arenas).

Long Bay buildings are designed for use in bay spans of over 35'. They use prefabricated metal frames combined with conventional joists to provide larger openings and clearances in buildings.

Uniports, originating in the UK in 1965 after being pioneered by Alfred Booth & Co in 1948, have been widely deployed worldwide, including in Arctic Canada, the African jungle, and the Kuwait desert. They are easily assembled with basic tools, suitable for unskilled labor, and can be swiftly disassembled and relocated. Uniports offer versatility, allowing for extensions and connections, along with insulation and partition options. Compact and efficient, up to 60 Mark 1 Uniports can be packed into a single 20-foot container.

== Components ==
Building portions that are shop assembled prior to shipment to site are commonly referenced as prefabricated. The smaller steel buildings tend to be prefabricated or simple enough to be constructed by anyone. Prefabrication offers the benefits of being less costly than traditional methods and is more environmentally friendly (since no waste is produced on-site). The larger steel buildings require skilled construction workers, such as ironworkers, to ensure proper and safe assembly.

There are five main types of structural components that make up a steel frame - tension members, compression members, bending members, combined force members and their connections. Tension members are usually found as web and chord members in trusses and open web steel joists. Ideally tension members carry tensile forces, or pulling forces, only and its end connections are assumed to be pinned. Pin connections prevent any moment(rotation) or shear forces from being applied to the member. Compression members are also considered as columns, struts, or posts. They are vertical members or web and chord members in trusses and joists that are in compression or being squished. Bending members are also known as beams, girders, joists, spandrels, purlins, lintels, and girts. Each of these members have their own structural application, but typically bending members will carry bending moments and shear forces as primary loads and axial forces and torsion as secondary loads. Combined force members are commonly known as beam-columns and are subjected to bending and axial compression. Connections are what bring the entire building together. They join these members together and must ensure that they function together as one unit.

== See also ==
- Commercial modular construction
- History of the steel industry (1970–present)
- Metal Building Manufacturers Association
- Sheet metal
- Steel producers
- Structural steel
- Self-framing metal buildings
