= Modular construction =

Construction technique

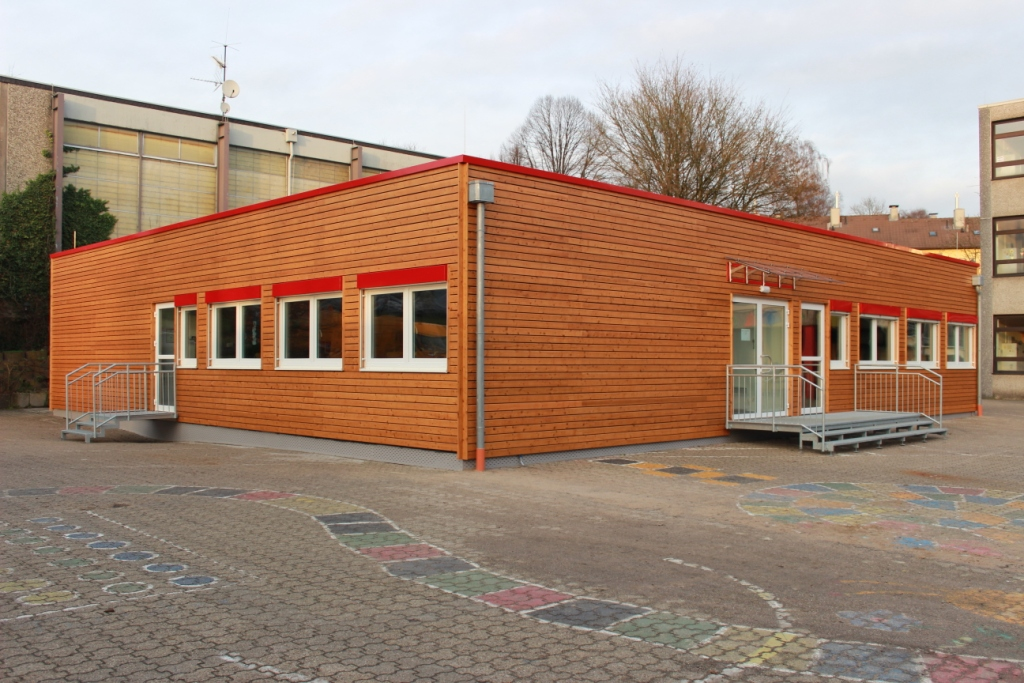
Algeco school built using pre-fabricated modular construction

Modular construction is a construction technique which involves the prefabrication of 2D panels or 3D volumetric structures in off-site factories and transportation to construction sites for assembly. This process has the potential to be superior to traditional building in terms of both time and costs, with claimed time savings of between 20 and 50 percent faster than traditional building techniques.

It is estimated that by 2030, modular construction could deliver US$22 billion in annual cost savings for the US and European construction industry, helping fill the US$1.6 trillion productivity gap. The current need for standardized, repeatable 3D volumetric housing pre-fabricated units and designs for student accommodations, affordable housing and hotels is driving demand for modular construction.

== Advantages ==
In a 2018 Practice Note, the NEC states that the benefits obtained from offsite construction mainly relate to the creation of components in a factory setting, protected from the weather and using manufacturing techniques such as assembly lines with dedicated and specialist equipment. Through the use of appropriate technology, modular construction can:

- increase the speed of construction by increasing the speed of manufacture of the component parts,
- reduce waste,
- increase economies of scale,
- improve quality leading to reduction in the whole life costs of assets
- reduce environmental impact such as dust and noise and
- reduce accidents and ill health by reducing the amount of construction work taking place at site

== Disadvantages ==
In contrast to the benefits mentioned earlier, modular construction presents two significant obstacles:

- Logistical challenges: The transportation of completed modules to the construction site demands meticulous organization and synchronization, often incurring substantial costs.
- Constraints on size: The manufacturing and transportation procedures may place limitations on the dimensions of individual modular components. This can impact the room sizes in the building, potentially influencing the overall architectural design.

== Time ==
Modular construction has consistently been at least 20 percent faster than traditional on-site builds. Currently, the design process of modular construction projects tends to take longer than that of traditional building. This is because modular construction is a fairly new technology and not many architects and engineers have experience working with it. In fewer words, the industry has not yet learned how to work this way. It is expected of design firms to develop module libraries which would assist in the automation of this process. These modules libraries would hold various pre-designed 2D panels and 3D structures which would be digitally assembled to create standardized structures.

The foundations of a structure are a crucial part of its rigidity. The magnitude and complexity of such will vary depending on the size, and overall weight of the structure. Therefore, the weight difference of a traditionally built house and a prefabricated structure will mean that foundations needed will be smaller and faster to build.

Off-site manufacturing is the pinnacle of modular construction. The ability to coordinate and repeat activities in a factory along with the increased help of automation result in largely faster manufacturing times than those of on-site building. A large time saver is the ability to parallelly work on the foundation of a structure and the manufacturing of the structure itself. This would be impossible with traditional construction. The on-site construction is radically simplified. The assembly of pre-fabricated components is as simple as assembling the 3D modules, and connecting the services to main site connections. A team of five workers can assemble up to six 3D modules, or the equivalent of 270 square meters of finished floor area, in a single work day.

=== Production algorithms ===
Since the technology required to manufacture the components of modular construction, the prefabricated parts of modular buildings are carried out by modular factories. To optimize time, modular factories consider the specifications and resources of the project and adapt a scheduling algorithm to fulfill the needs of this unique project. However, current scheduling methods assume the quantity of resources will never reach zero, therefore representing an unrealistic work cycle.

A modular factory handling a single project at any given point is rare, and would produce low returns. Hyun and Lee's research propose a Genetic Algorithm (GA) scheduling model which takes into consideration various project's characteristics and shares resources. The production sequence of this algorithm would be largely affected by which modules need to be transported to which site and the dates they should arrive. After considering the variables of production, transportation and on-site assembly the objective function is:
$$min \Sigma (S),     \ldots
S = S_i + P_i - E_i$$
Where S_{i} is the number of stocked units per day, P_{i} is the number of units per day and E_{i} is number of units installed per day. Production algorithms are continuously being developed to further accelerate the production of modular construction buildings, enlarging the time saving gap with traditional construction methods.

== Cost ==
Modular construction can yield up to 20 percent of the total project cost in savings. However, there is also a risk of it increasing the cost by 10 percent. This occurs when the savings in the labor area of construction are outweighed by the increase in costs of the logistics area and materials. The pre-fabrication of components used in modular construction have a higher logistics cost than traditional building. Since the panels or 3D structures have to be manufactured in a factory and transported to the construction site, new variables which alter the flow of construction are presented.

=== Transportation ===
Transportation of fabricated components is naturally more expensive than that of raw materials. For one, even a number of 2D panels stacked together are much harder to transport than the raw cement, wood or material used to build them. Panels run a high risk of suffering minor or major damage when being transported through land. If a panel were to be damaged, it would likely have to be replaced entirely. The factory would need to temporarily stop production of other panels to replace this one, increasing the overall manufacturing hours and therefore cost. On top of the manufacturing hours, the transportation hours would also be increased, increasing yet another cost. Regardless, the transportation of 2D panels is still a good alternative to on-site construction.

Transportation reaches its peak cost when shipping 3D volumetric structures. While 1 m^{2} of 2D floor space takes approximately US$8 to transport 250 km, its equivalent in 3D floor space takes US$45. Adding to this the replacement cost if the structure gets damaged during transport creates a large cost increase.

=== Construction ===
Assembling components in a factory off-site means that workers can use the repeatability of the structures as well as the use of automation to facilitate the manufacturing process. By standardizing the overall design of structures, work which would usually require expensive workers with specific skills (e.g. mechanical, electrical and plumbing) can be completed by low-cost manufacturers, decreasing the total salaries cost. As very little manufacturing occurs on-site, up to 80% of traditional labor activity can be moved off-site to the module factory. This leads to a lower number of sub-contractors needed, further decreasing overall total salaries cost. Overall, the larger the labor-intensive portion of a project, the larger the savings will be if modular construction is used.

Project such as student accommodations, hotels and affordable housing are great candidates for modular construction. The repeatability of their structures leads to faster manufacturing times and therefore less overall cost. Meanwhile, if the project is (for example) a modern beach house with highly irregular wall spaces and ceilings, traditional construction methods may be preferable. As the industry continues to adapt and grow, these repeatable designs could one day be modified and adapted to fit all kinds of structures at decreased costs. The principles of modular prefabrication are also applied to non-building structures, such as in the creation of swimming pool systems which use modular composite hybrid panels to facilitate rapid assembly in difficult-to-access sites like rooftops or remote locations.

== Safety ==
Construction is considered to be one of the most dangerous industries. Workers fall from heights, objects are dropped, muscles are strained and environmental hazards can be found. Modular construction constrains all manufacturing activities to a ground level, clean space with fewer workers needed. It is estimated that reportable accidents are reduced by over 80% relative to site-intensive construction. When asked in a survey about safety management in the construction industry conducted by McGraw Hill Construction in 2013, 50% of the construction industry believed that pre-fabrication was safer than traditional on-site building, while only 4% said that prefabrication or modular construction had a negative impact on safety performance. Of the general and specialty contractors surveyed, 78% and 59% said that the largest safety impact was the undergoing of complex tasks at ground level. According to the CDC, falling is the leading cause of work-related fatalities in construction, making up more than one in every three deaths in the industry. The reduction of heights at which workers need perform tasks on subsequently reduces the fatality risk they experience, greatly increasing the overall safety of the industry. Also, 69% of the general contractors as well as 69% of the specialty contractors mentioned that the reduced number of workers performing different tasks at the off-site factory also improved construction site safety. Overall, modular construction is safer for the following reasons:

- Stable work location
- Tasks are performed in ample spaces
- Ground level assembly
- Cover from harsh weather
- Better monitoring of unsafe activities
- 30 to 50 percent reduction in time spent at construction site
- Fewer personnel on-site

Modular construction is still not considered an entirely safe alternative. However, it does reduce accidents and fatalities by a significant amount. Especially in the manufacturing process of a project. 48.1% of all accidents during on-site construction were fall-related, while only 9.1% of the accidents at manufacturing plants were from falls. Manufacturing plant workers were more likely to be struck by an object or equipment (37.1%) and fracture and amputation had the same injury type frequency at 27.3%. Nevertheless, as the construction industry continues to adapt and moves over to more sustainable construction methods like pre-fabricated modular construction, it is expected that the overall safety number of accidents at construction sites will decrease.

The use of modular construction methods is encouraged by proponents of Prevention through Design techniques in construction. It is included as a recommended hazard control for construction projects in the "PtD - Architectural Design and Construction Education Module" published by the National Institute for Occupational Safety and Health.

== Sustainability ==
Modular construction is a great alternative to traditional construction when looking at the amount of waste each method produces. When constructing a high-rise building in Wolverhampton, 824 modules were used. During this process about 5% of the total weight of the construction was produced as waste. If it is compared to traditional methods' 10–13% average waste, a small difference can be observed. This difference may not seem like much when talking about small structures; however, when talking about a 100,000 lb/ft^{2} building, it is a significant percentage. Also, the number of on-site deliveries decreased by up to 70%. The deliveries are instead moved to the modular factory, where more material can be received. On-site noise pollution is greatly reduced as well. By moving the manufacturing process to an off-site factory, usually located outside of the city, neighboring buildings are not impacted as they would be with the traditional building process.

== Modular construction systems ==
Open-source and commercial hardware components used in modular construction include: open beams, bit beams, maker beams, grid beams, contraptors, OpenStructures components, etc. Space frame systems (such as Mero, Unistrut, Delta Structures, etc.) also tend to be modular in design. Other materials used in construction which are interlocking and thus reusable/modular in nature include interlocking bricks.

== See also ==
- Open-source architecture – Emerging design paradigm emphasizing collaboration and ease of use
- Commercial modular construction – Non-residential structures that are mostly built offsite
- Modular building – Prefabricated building or house that consists of repeated sections
- Mass production – High volume production of standardized products
- Prefabricated building – Building constructed using prefabrication
