= OpenStructures =

Open source modular construction model

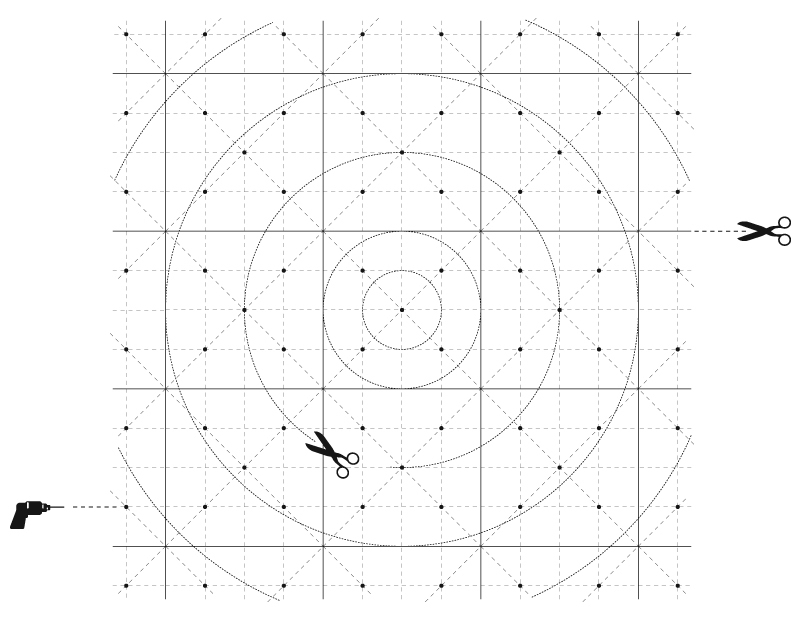
Interfaces of OpenStructures (OS) compatible components should match a grid pattern, here shown with examples on a graph paper based on one square per 10 mm (dots for every 20 mm or 40 mm every other line)

OpenStructures is an open source modular construction model based on a shared geometrical grid, called the OS grid. It was conceived by designer Thomas Lommée, and first demonstrated at the Z33, a house for contemporary art. According to Lommee, the OpenStructures project explores the possibility of a modular system where "everyone designs for everyone." OpenStructures is developing a database where anyone can share designs which are in turn available for download by the public. Each component design in the OS system will feature previously designed OS parts that were used to create it. In addition, each part will feature component designs that can be made from it.

The OpenStructures model includes large and small scale manufacturers as well as craftsmen. They are invited to create their own designs according to the OS standard for sale on the market, which can in turn be fixed or disassembled at their end of life and made into new products.

== Grid ==
The OpenStructures grid is built around a square of 40×40 mm and is scalable. The squares can be further subdivided or put together to form larger squares, without losing inter-compatibility.

Designers use the OS grid to determine preferred dimensions, assembly points, and interconnecting diameters. This allows parts that were not originally from the same design to be used together in a new design.

For example, the 10 mm OpenStructures grid may dictate preferred dimensions such as:

- Squares of 40 mm (or multiples thereof, or alternatively squares of 10 mm, 20 mm or 30 mm). For example, the sketch on graph paper seen above can fit 9 complete 40 × 40 mm squares (see the solid lines in the illustration).
- Inscribed circles of 20, 40, 80, 120, 160 mm, etc. (or radiuses of 10, 20, 40, 80, 120 mm, etc.). These can for example be used for bolt circles of 4×80 mm or 4×160 mm.
- Circumscribed circles on the other hand will not have such round numbers (e.g., a 40×40 mm square will give a circumscribed diameter of ~56.57 mm, while a square of 80×80 mm gives a circumscribed diameter of ~11.314 mm, etc.)
- Rhombus with sides measuring 28.28 mm (or a multiple thereof, for example 56.56 mm or 84.84 mm). (Illustrated with dotted lines at a 45 degree angle in the graph paper illustration seen above).
- Any other shapes which mates to the grid, for example cyclic polygons of matching sizes
Examples of inscribed figures of various polygons (the circles from inside are passing through each of the other objects)

Examples of circumscribed circles (the circles from outside are passing through each of the other objects)

== Scales ==
OpenStructures works at several scales, and analogies are made to biological systems including (from smallest to biggest):

- Parts, like body tissues.
- Components, like organs, formed by the functional grouping together of multiple tissues. An example is a motor.
- Structures, like a group of related organs in an organ system. Here, different components are composed with frames and joints, such as a bicycle.
- Superstructures, like organisms, can be understood as the whole hierarchical assembly of different structures that together function as a stable whole which has the capacity to grow and develop. Example are houses or electric vehicles.

== Open architecture ==
One of the research areas of OpenStructures is architecture. Architects of the Brussels Cooperation Collective have worked on the subject.

Autarchitecture (West Flemish: autarkytecture, from Ancient Greek auto 'self' and architecture) is based in OpenStructures and proposes flexible constructions that can adapt over time.

Open smart brick elements and buildings can be based on OpenStructures.

== Other uses ==
Fab lab Academy had been building several beehives making use of the OpenStructures system to make them more sustainable.

== See also ==
- 3D printing, additive process used to make a 3D object
- Bolt circle, mounting pattern where a number of screw holes are evenly distributed along an imaginary circle with a given diameter
- Contraptor, open-source construction set for building various Cartesian robots, like mini-CNC machines, 3D printers, and plotters
- EUR-pallet, the standard European pallet
- Euro container, system of stacking reusable industrial boxes
- Modular building, prefabricated building or house that consists of repeated sections
- Modular construction, prefabrication of 2D panels or 3D volumetric structures in off-site factories and transportation to construction sites for assembly
- Open architecture, software design paradigm emphasizing ease of swapping out and modifying components
- Open source, source code made freely available
- Open-source architecture, emerging design paradigm emphasizing collaboration and ease of use
- Preferred metric sizes, engineering and construction practice to limit the number of different sizes of components needed
- Reusable packaging, packaging manufactured of durable materials and is specifically designed for reuse, multiple trips and extended life
- Reverse logistics, return processing, i.e. all operations related to the upstream movement of products and materials
- Smart brick, advanced building blocks for faster, energy-efficient construction
- Square tiling, a regular tiling consisting of four squares around every vertex
- Systainer, modular plastic containers for transporting power tools
- WikiHouse, project for designing and building houses
