= Open-source architecture =

Architecture documentation paradigm

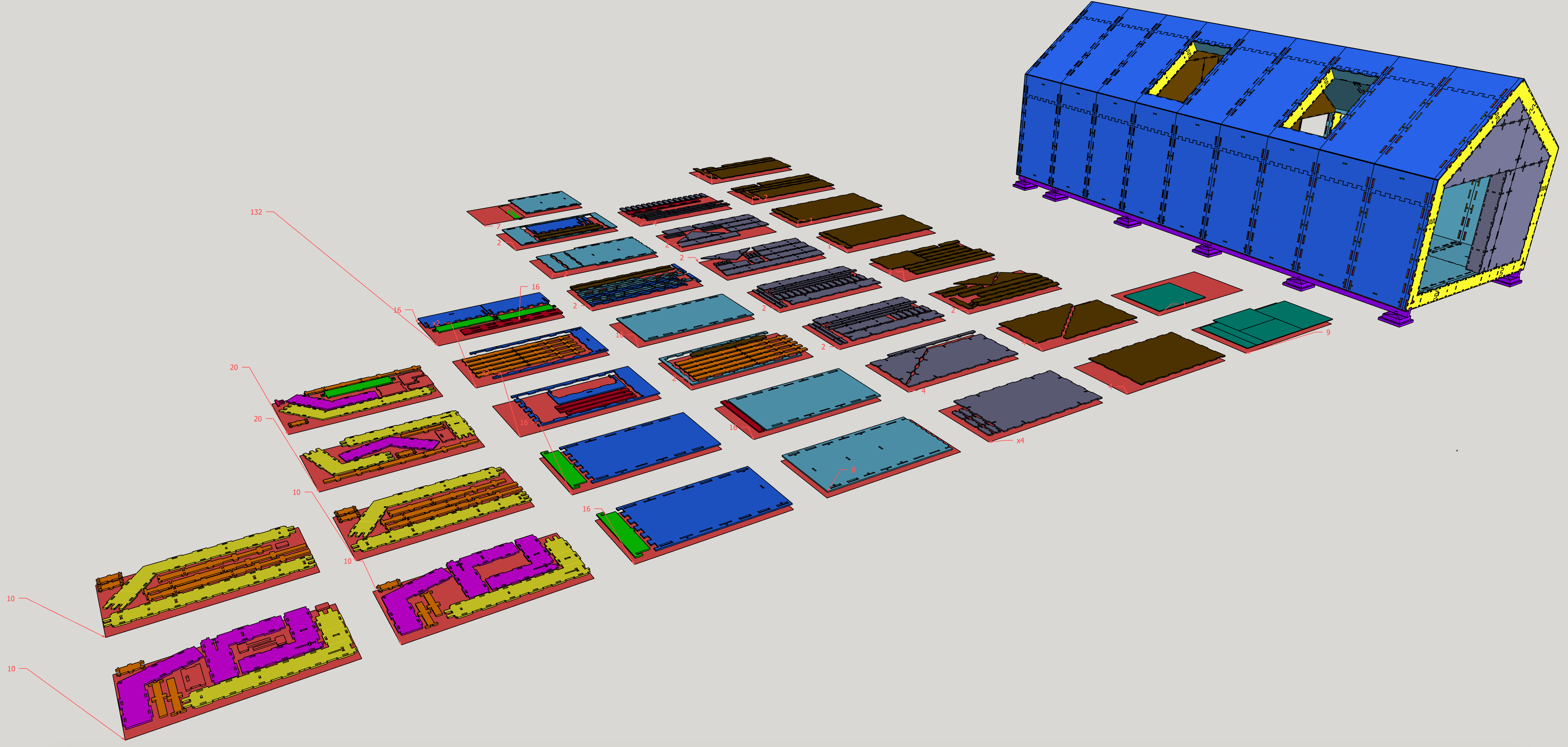
WikiHouse model for SketchUp from GitHub

Not open sourced software architecture. For open source computer aided design tools see: LibreCAD, FreeCAD.

Open Source Architecture, sometimes referred to as OSArc, is architecture where the structure’s design documentation uses some form of open-source licensing, that often uses a modular design system, and seeks community collaboration and use. The concept began to appear in the early 2000s and was first applied to a built project’s design in 2005. Many open source architectural projects are aligned with public interest design principles. They are often motivated, in part, to address high costs and shortages of housing and structures for social development, such as schools and health facilities. Open source architecture draws upon a number of preceding and adjacent concepts including: vernacular architecture, citizen centered design, peer production, do it yourself practices, modular building, open source licensing, open source software, open source hardware, and the open-design movement.

== History ==
=== 2000s ===
Open source architecture arose after the emergence of the open source software movement in the 1980s -1990s, the open source hardware movements in the 1990s-2000s, and the publishing of the first open source Creative Commons copyright license in 2002. As early as 2003, ideas from these fields began to merge with architectural thought in the forms of speculative writing, theorizing, and experimentation.

Between 2004 and 2006 Architecture for Humanity hosted a design competition and completed construction of the Siyathemba youth soccer and health facility in Somkhele, South Africa. The organization used a Creative Commons Developing Nations License, making it the first built architectural structure that had an open source license applied to its designs. During a TED Prize presentation in 2006, Architecture for Humanity’s co-founder Cameron Sinclair made a broad call for architectural designs to be made freely available for the developing world using a collaborative approach.

=== 2010s ===
The architectural magazine Domus published an op-ed manifesto titled “Open Source Architecture (OSArc)” in their June 6, 2011 edition, which sought to capture the emergence of this new approach in architectural thought and production. The essay subtitled “A proposition for a different approach to designing space to succeed the single-author model includes tools from disparate sources to create new paradigms for thinking and building,” was written by 16 co-authors: Paola Antonelli, Adam Bly, Lucas Dietrich, Joseph Grima, Dan Hill, John Habraken, Alex Haw, John Maeda, Nicholas Negroponte, Hans Ulrich Obrist, Carlo Ratti, Casey Reas, Marco Santambrogio, Mark Shepard, Chiara Somajni, and Bruce Sterling. Initially, Domus editor Joseph Grima had approached Carlo Ratti to write the op-ed, who instead suggested a collaborative approach to the content using Wikipedia as a tool for managing the process. The original content used to publish the Domus op-ed can be found in this Wikipedia article's history page.

Around this same time Wikihouse emerged – a construction system using engineered wood, CNC routers, modular building, and open source design and production files under Creative Commons licenses. The project was founded by architect Alistair Parvin and Nick Lerodiaconou with an initial one-story Wikihouse structure showcased at the Gwangju Design Biennale in September 2011. Subsequently, Wikihouse developed a two-story model titled “Wikihouse 4.0”, which was presented at the 2014 London Design Festival. Throughout the 2010s, Wikihouse contributions and development of the design system continued and a number of pilots and small scale projects were completed.

In 2015, the book Open Source Architecture was published. Written by Carlo Ratti, Matthew Claudel, and many co-authors of the 2011 Domus op-ed, the book expands on the ideas laid out in that initial piece.

In April 2016, Pritzker Prize winning architect Alejandro Aravena and his firm Elemental released designs for four preexisting and completed housing designs online for free download under a custom “some rights reserved” copyright. Specifically, the firm authorizes: the use of the donated drawings as a base guide for the development of new projects for housing, that the plans are for reference as they apply to specific conditions and building codes, the plans must be adapted by a qualified professional, that the firm assumes no responsibility for their use, requests attribution, and does not allow trademark usage.

Also in 2016, Open Source Ecology, a non-profit initially focused on open source industrial, construction, and farming machinery, partnered with the Open Building Institute, a project started by a founding member of the Open Source Hardware Association. This partnership developed Seed House, a single family home using a modular design system and a Creative Commons license. The first Seed House prototype was built in Missouri in November 2016 and development and iterations of the Seed House design continued through the 2010s.

=== 2020s ===
Open Source Ecology and the Open Building Institute continue to develop Seed House designs in the 2020s. In 2025 the partnership developed a course on construction skills related to building a Seed House.

From 2020 onwards, Wikihouse has also continued to expand production of houses using their design system. Between 2020-2026, Wikihouse’s website presents 12 projects which have been completed or are under construction this decade in the UK, Netherlands, New Zealand, Mongolia and the United States. The projects range from single structures self-built by their owners to multi-unit housing projects built in partnership with community organizations.

== Licenses ==
From the 2000s to 2020s open source architectural designs have primarily relied on versions of Creative Commons licenses.

- Creative Commons Developing Nations License (retired)
  - Architecture for Humanity Projects
- Creative Commons Attribution-ShareAlike
  - Wikihouse: Skylark
  - Open Source Ecology / Open Building Institute: Seed House
- Custom “Some Rights Reserved” Copyright
  - Elemental: Villa Verde, La Barnechea, Quinta Monroy, Monterrey

== Differences from Open Source Software and Hardware ==
While open source architecture shares elements with adjacent fields of open source software and open source hardware there are a number of differences: some of the largest are the financial costs and complexity of producing a building scale structure on a plot of land. This is in comparison to the cost and regulation to deploy a piece of software or produce a typical piece of hardware or tool.

As of 2024 construction costs of a typical home in the United States was $428,215 with land costing an additional $91,057. Additionally, architectural designs must address many context specific needs, whether they are implicit environmental or social in nature, or explicit legal and financial in nature. For example, designs for built structures of a certain size and use must meet building and planning code requirements, and receive the stamp of a licensed engineer, architect, or both, in order to receive planning permission from a granting governmental authority. Permitting requirements are in part due to the life safety and public health issues involved with occupied structures, such as fire protection, electrical safety, water quality, air quality, and the ability to withstand seismic and weather events.

These additional needs to realize architectural projects mean that the time to implement and financial costs are many times larger than in other fields that adopt open source approaches. This limits the iteration speed that an open source architectural design can evolve at, as well as the size of the community that can produce and then benefit from the designs, both of which are commonly seen in successful open source communities.

An emerging set of patterns of open source architecture projects, seen in the Wikihouse and Seed House projects, is to develop modular design systems of smaller interchangeable components and design smaller structures that have less permitting requirements and costs. All structures built up to the 2020s from open source architectural designs have been two stories or smaller and all projects active in the 2020s use a modular design system.

== See also ==
- Commons-based peer production
- Knowledge commons
- List of building information modeling software
- List of housing types
- Modular building
- Modular construction systems
- Modular design
- Open architecture
- Open-design movement
- Open-source 3D file formats
- Open Source Ecology
- Open-source appropriate technology
- Open-source hardware
- Open-source software
- OpenStructures
- Prefabricated building
- Reefer container housing units
- Thingiverse
- WikiHouse
