= Amygdaleza detention center =

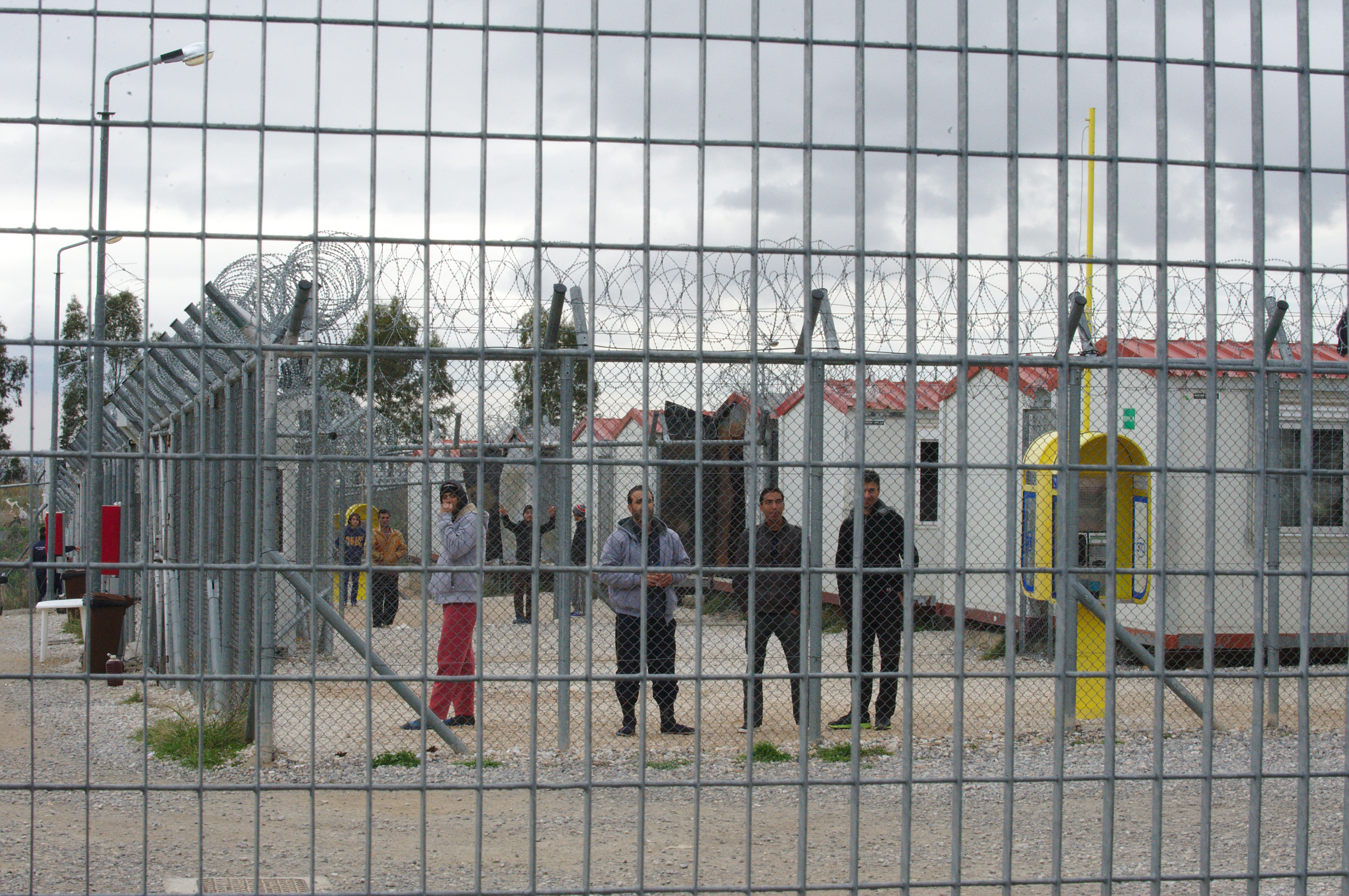
Amygdaleza Detention Center, 2015

Amygdaleza detention center (Greek: Κέντρο κράτησης Αμυγδαλέζας) is a center for detaining undocumented immigrants, situated in Amygdaleza of Acharnes, Attica in Greece.

In March 2012 the Ministry of Citizen Protection announced the establishment of thirty "centers for the temporary detention of undocumented immigrants". The following month Minister Michalis Chrisochoidis announced that the first center would operate in Amygdaleza, Attica, with initial planning for 820 immigrants in a space comprising 250 containerized housing units, fenced internally and surrounded externally by a wall and bars. According to Chrisochoidis, the immigrants would be detained for a few weeks and then be deported to their countries.

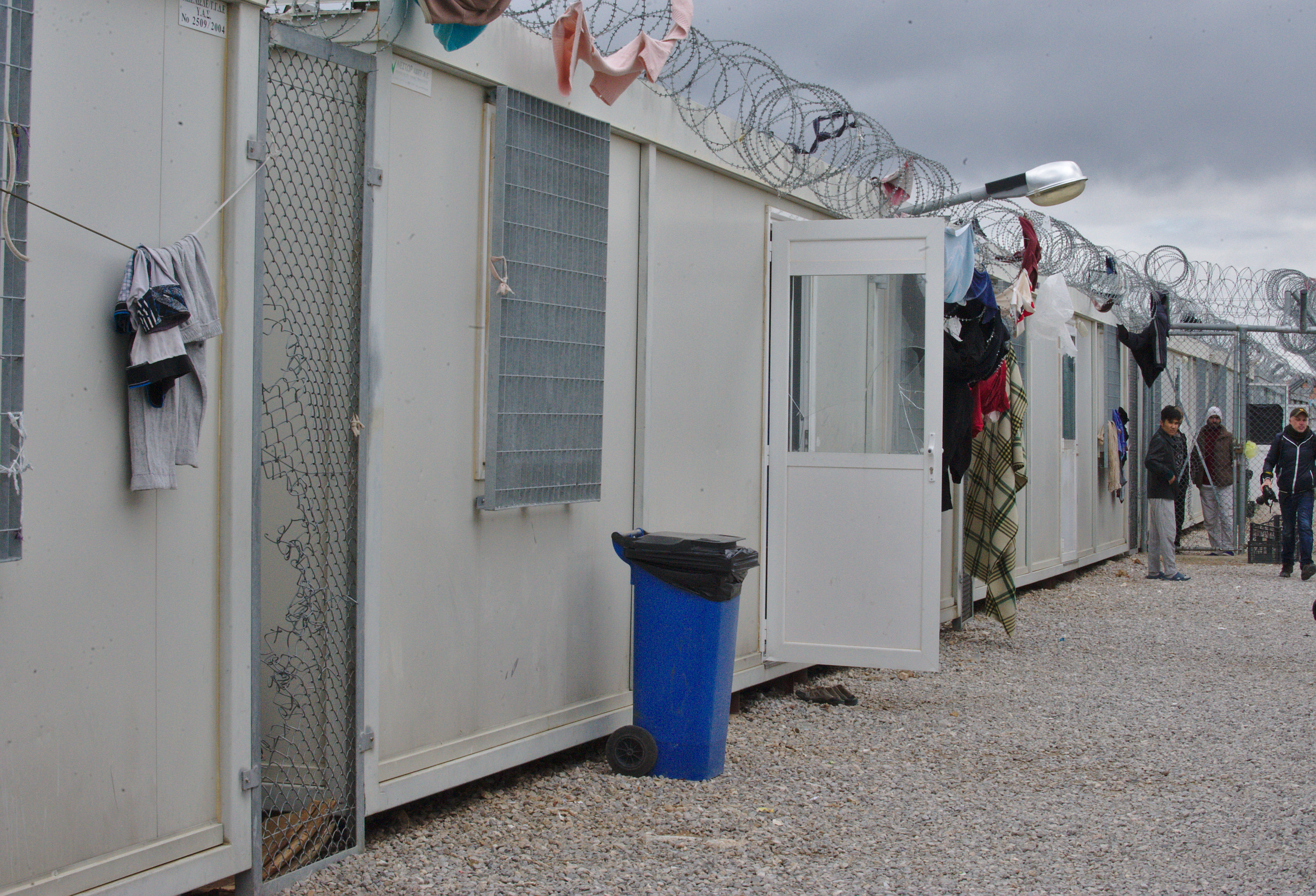
CHU in the Amygdaleza Detention Center (2015).

The first immigrants were transferred to Amygdaleza in the end of April 2012. Works for expansion of the detention center to accommodate 1000 persons were ordered by the new Minister of Citizen Protection Nikos Dendias. In October 2012 the detention period was extended from 2 to 12 months. In March 2013 there were one thousand persons in detention awaiting deportation.

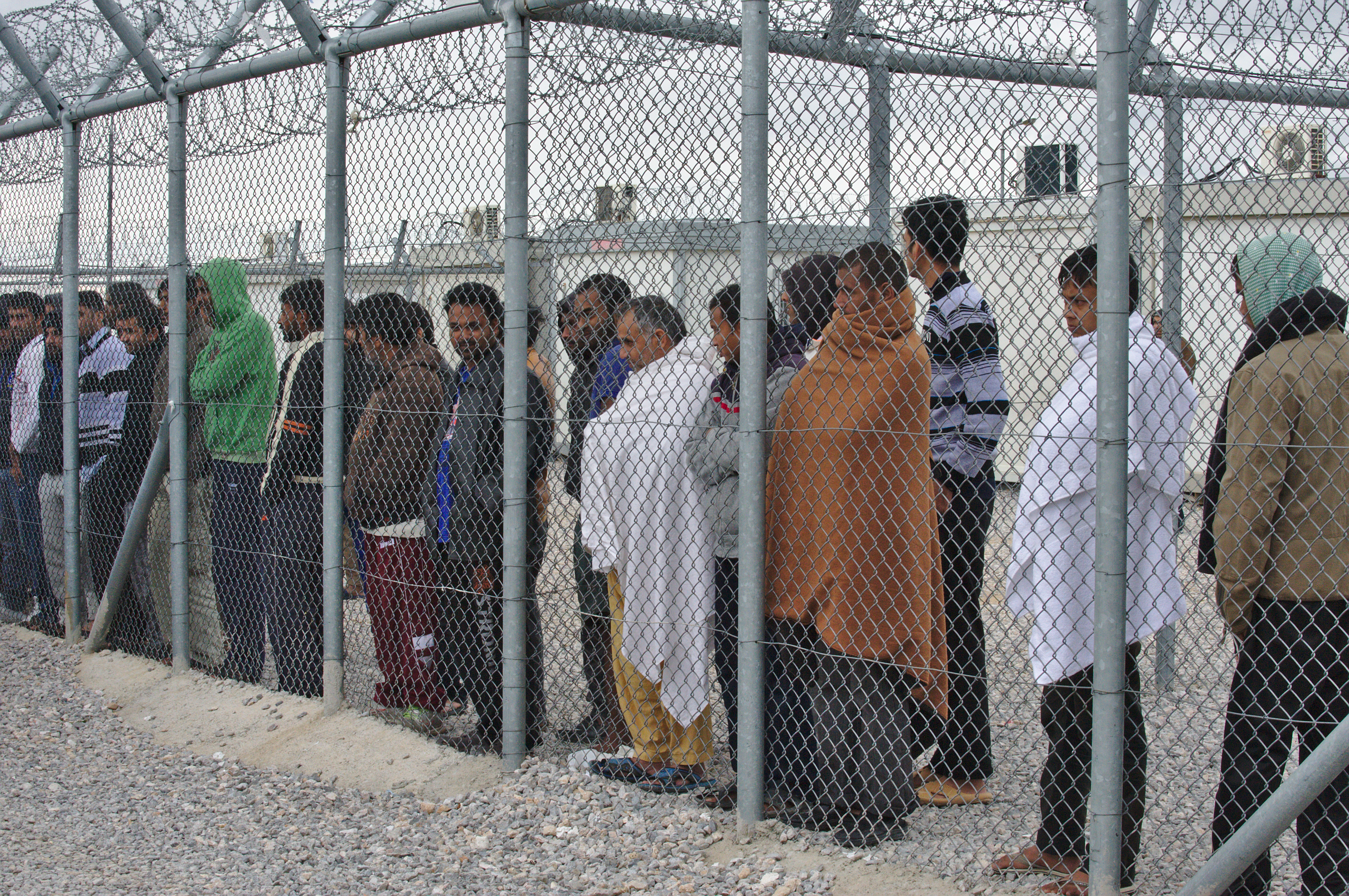
Detainees in Amygdaleza (February 2015)

In April 2013 700 detainees started a hunger strike, whereas several attempted suicide. In August 2013 the detainees revolted, mainly due to the extension of their detention from 12 to 18 months. Ten detainees escaped, of whom two were arrested the following day, fourteen more were arrested before escaping and forty-one were referred for trial. A few days later the Greek Ombudsman issued a report stating that "the spaces for policed detention of foreigners have been transformed into a type of prison, given the high and continually growing number of detainees who are detained for many months", which has resulted in failure to secure fundamental human rights for the detainees. The unrest resulted in 65 immigrants being brought to trial, all of whom were unanimously acquitted and released on New Year's Eve 2015.

As of February 2015, three detained immigrants had died from illness, and in February 2015 a Pakistani man committed suicide.
