= Open desk =

Open desk may refer to:

- OpenDesk, a free and open-source productivity software suite
- Opendesk, a furniture initiative
