= Refrigerated container =

Used for intermodal cargo

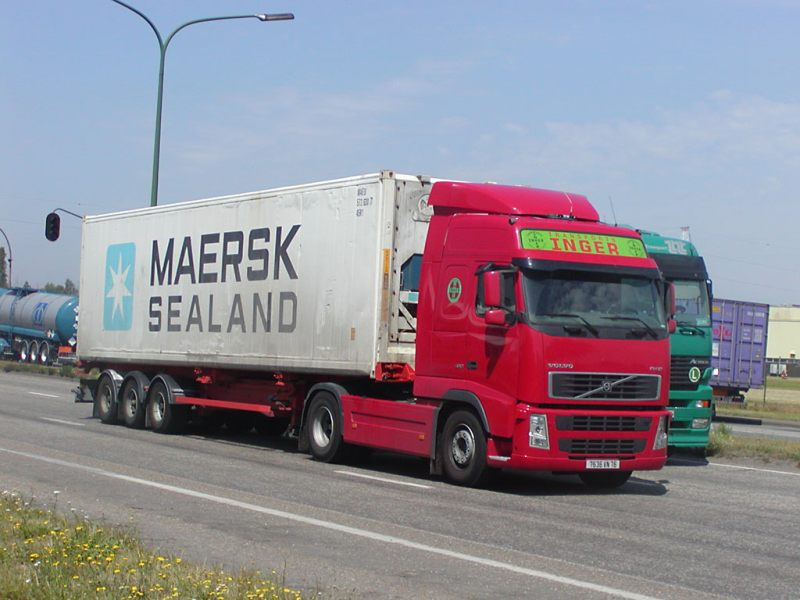
A Maersk Line reefer container on a semi-trailer truck

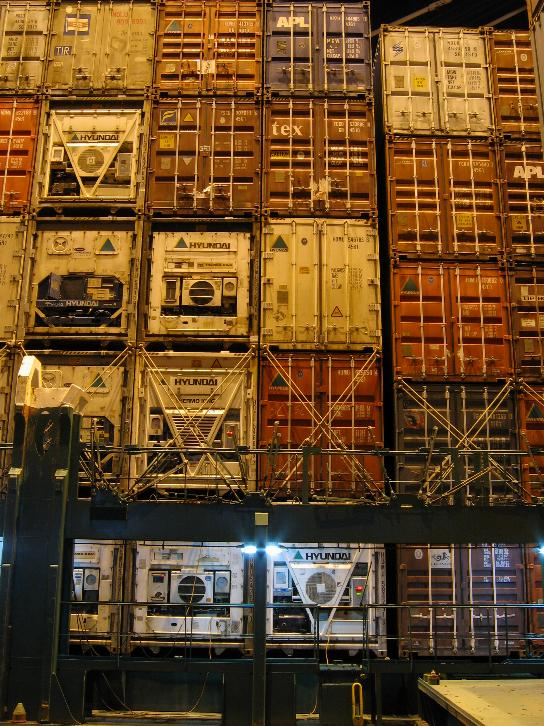
Containers loaded on a container ship with the refrigeration units visible

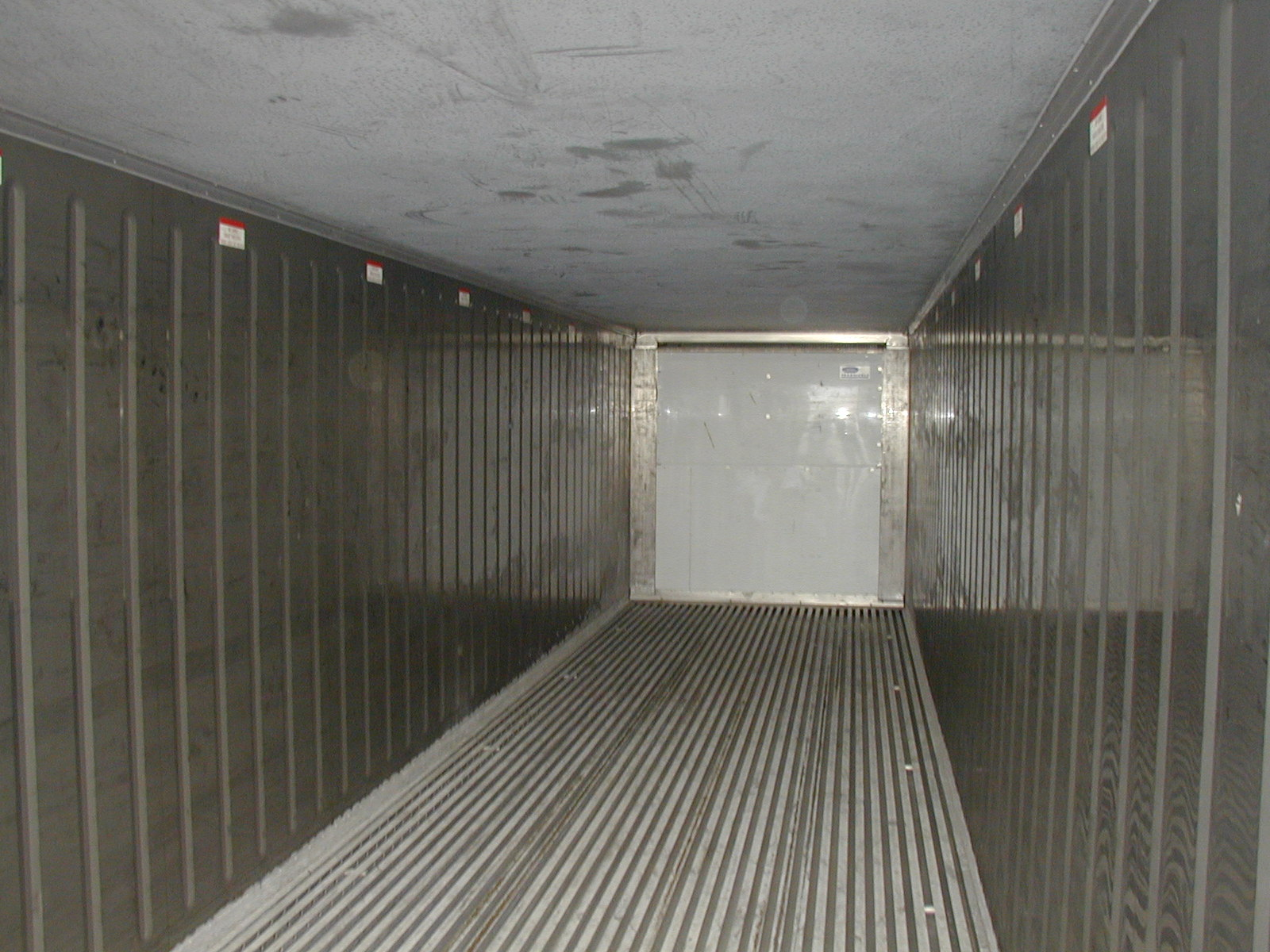
Interior of a refrigerated container

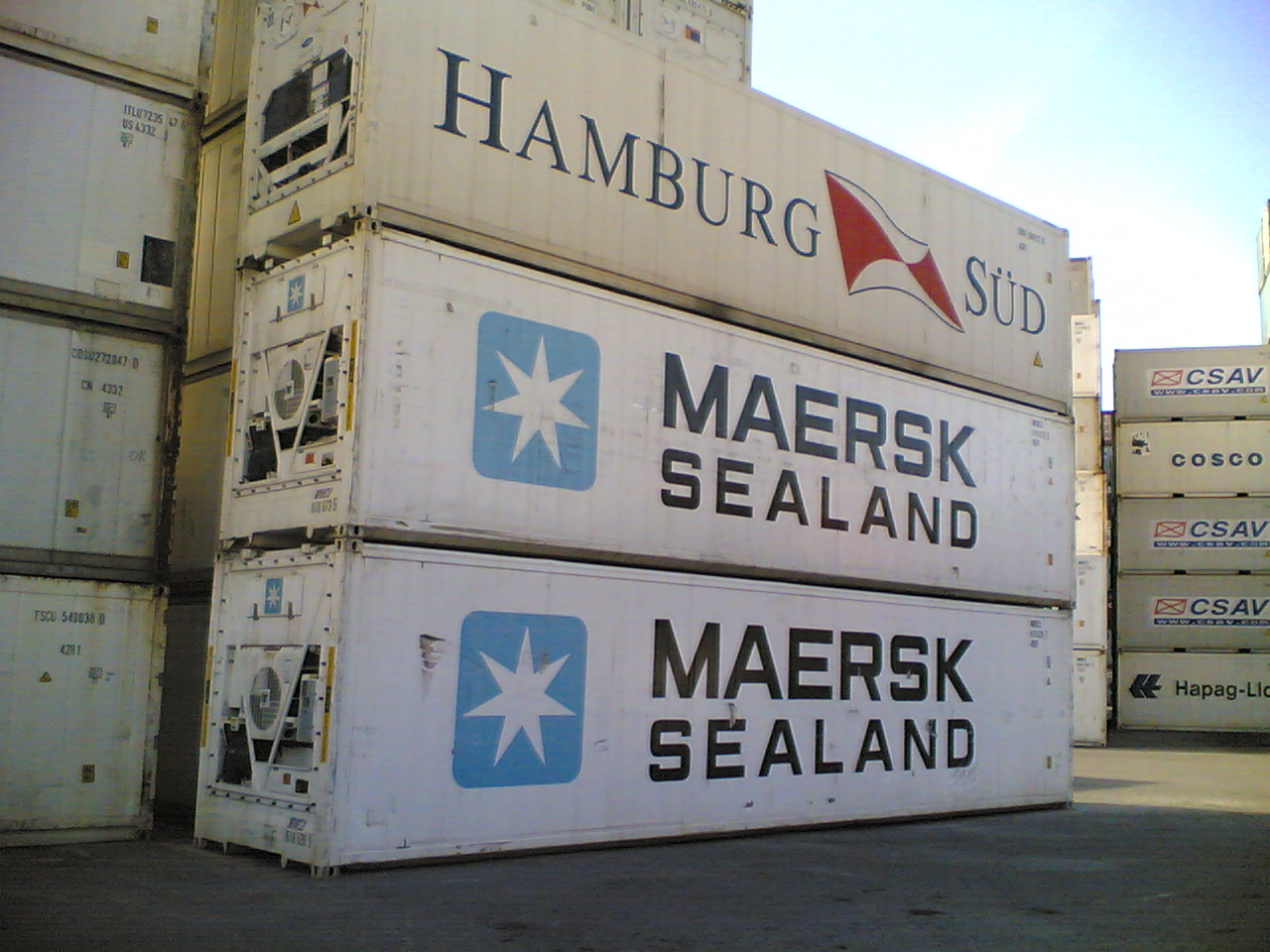
Reefer containers of Maersk Line and Hamburg Süd

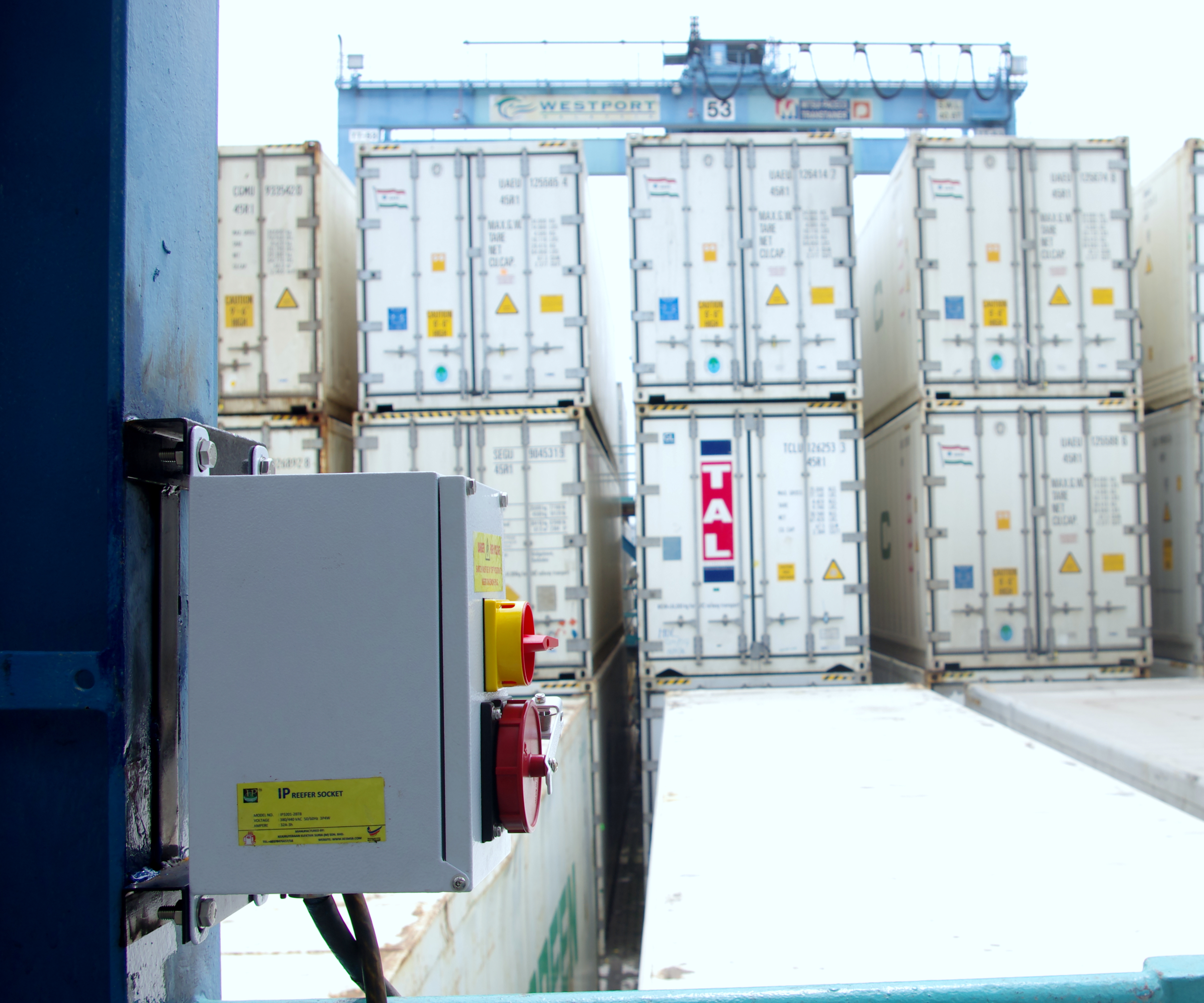
Reefer sockets used to power reefer containers

A refrigerated container or reefer is an intermodal container (shipping container) used in intermodal freight transport that is capable of refrigeration for the transportation of temperature-sensitive, perishable cargo such as fruits, vegetables, meat, fish, seafood, and other similar items.

While a reefer will have an integral refrigeration unit, they rely on external power, from electrical power points (“reefer points”) at a land-based site, a container ship or on quay. When being transported over the road on a trailer or over rail wagon, they can be powered from diesel powered generators ("gen sets") which attach to the container whilst on road journeys. Refrigerated containers are capable of maintaining an internal constant temperature ranging from −65 °C (−85 °F) up to 40 °C (104 °F), with higher temperatures maintained using electric heaters, if installed.

Some reefers are equipped with a water cooling system, which can be used if the reefer is stored below deck on a vessel without adequate ventilation to remove the heat generated.

Water cooling systems are more expensive than air current ventilation to remove heat from cargo holds, and the use of water cooling systems is declining. Air cooling and water cooling are usually combined.

The impact on society of reefer containers is vast, allowing consumers all over the world to enjoy fresh produce at any time of year and experience previously unavailable fresh produce from many other parts of the world.

== Cryogenic cooling ==
Another refrigeration system sometimes used where the journey time is short is total loss refrigeration, in which frozen carbon dioxide ice (or sometimes liquid nitrogen) is used for cooling. The cryogenically frozen gas slowly evaporates, and thus cools the container and is vented from it. The container is cooled for as long as there is frozen gas available in the system. These have been used in railcars for many years, providing up to 17 days temperature regulation. Whilst refrigerated containers are not common for air transport, total loss dry ice systems are usually used. These containers have a chamber which is loaded with solid carbon dioxide and the temperature is regulated by a thermostatically controlled electric fan, and the air freight versions are intended to maintain temperature for up to around 100 hours.

Full-size intermodal containers equipped with these "cryogenic" systems can maintain their temperature for the 30 days needed for sea transport. Since they do not require an external power supply, cryogenically refrigerated containers can be stored anywhere on any vessel that can accommodate "dry" (un-refrigerated) ocean freight containers.

== Redundant refrigeration ==
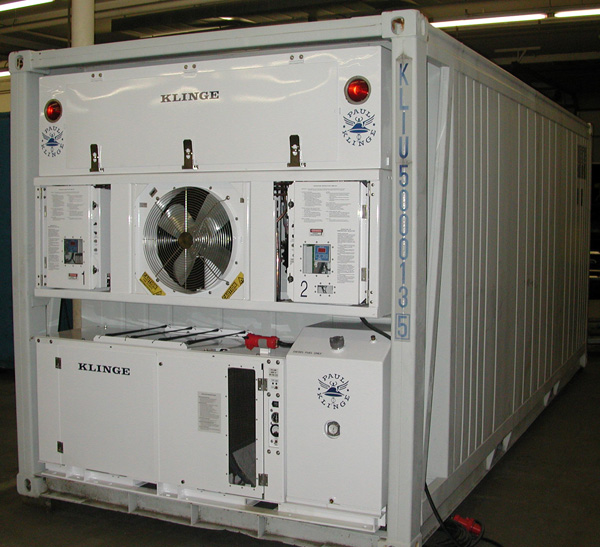
A container fitted with two refrigeration units and a single diesel generator

Valuable, temperature-sensitive, or hazardous cargo often require the utmost in system reliability. This type of reliability can only be achieved through the installation of a redundant refrigeration system.

A redundant refrigeration system consists of integrated primary and back-up refrigeration units. If the primary unit malfunctions, the secondary unit automatically starts. To provide reliable power to the refrigeration units, these containers are often fitted with one or more diesel generator sets.

Containers fitted with these systems may be required for transporting certain dangerous goods in order to comply with the International Maritime Organization’s regulations.

== Reefer types and dimensions ==
The reefers have the same dimensions as intermodal containers and thus can be loaded in double-stack on rail flatcar.

== See also ==
- Cold chain
- Reefer ship
- Refrigerator car
- Refrigerator truck
- Thermal insulation
- Reefer container housing units
