= Joseph Grima =

Joseph or Joe Grima may refer to:

- Joseph Grima (architect), British architect, critic, and editor
- Joe Grima (politician) (1936–2017), Maltese broadcaster and politician
- Joey Grima, Australian rugby league football coach
- Joe Grima (rugby league), New Zealand rugby league footballer
