= Containerized housing unit =

Shipping container pre-fabricated into a living quarters

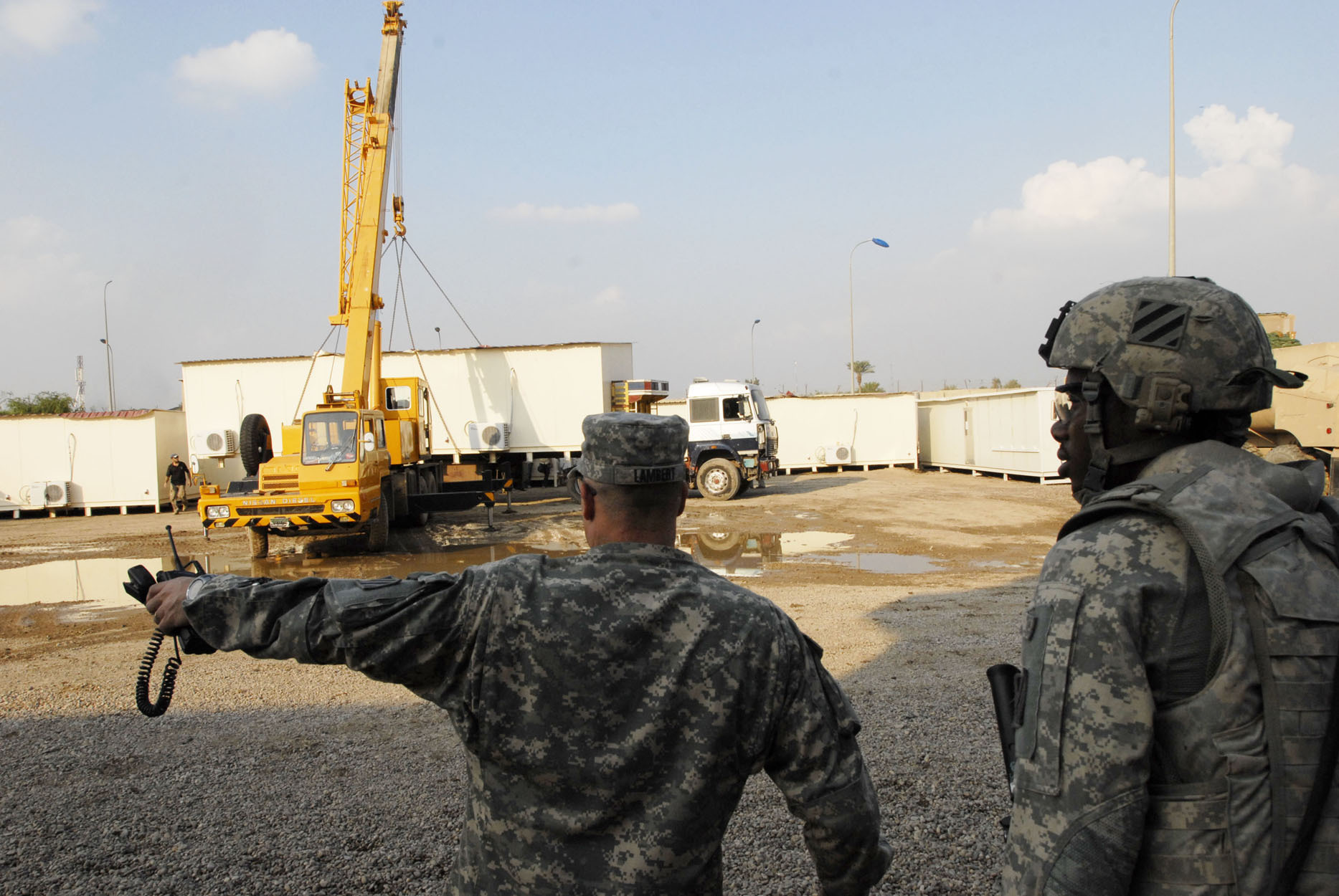
Containerized housing units being moved in a US Army installation in Baghdad during 2008

A containerized housing unit, usually abbreviated as CHU (and sometimes called containerized living unit or CLU) is an ISO shipping container pre-fabricated into a living quarters. Such containers can be transported by container ships, railroad cars, planes, and trucks that are capable of transporting intermodal freight transport cargo.

Container housing units are related to the site and land occupied during a certain amount of time by the need of water supply and excavation, electricity, telecommunications, etc. Plug-in city is a concept that is developing as more units capable of moving by intermodal means are brought up to the market. Local site is thus of most importance on correct container housing units use. An example of CLU housing is at the Operation Enduring Freedom – Horn of Africa base (Camp Lemonnier) in Djibouti.

Modular shipping containers are typically referred to as isotainers. In some military applications, the slang terms "Combat Housing Unit" or "cans" has also gained acceptance.

First developed by Malcom McLean to transport cargo, freight containers withstand much abuse. Freight container housing is becoming more and more popular. Shipping container architecture is a form of architecture using steel intermodal containers (shipping containers) as structural elements.

== Reefer container housing units ==
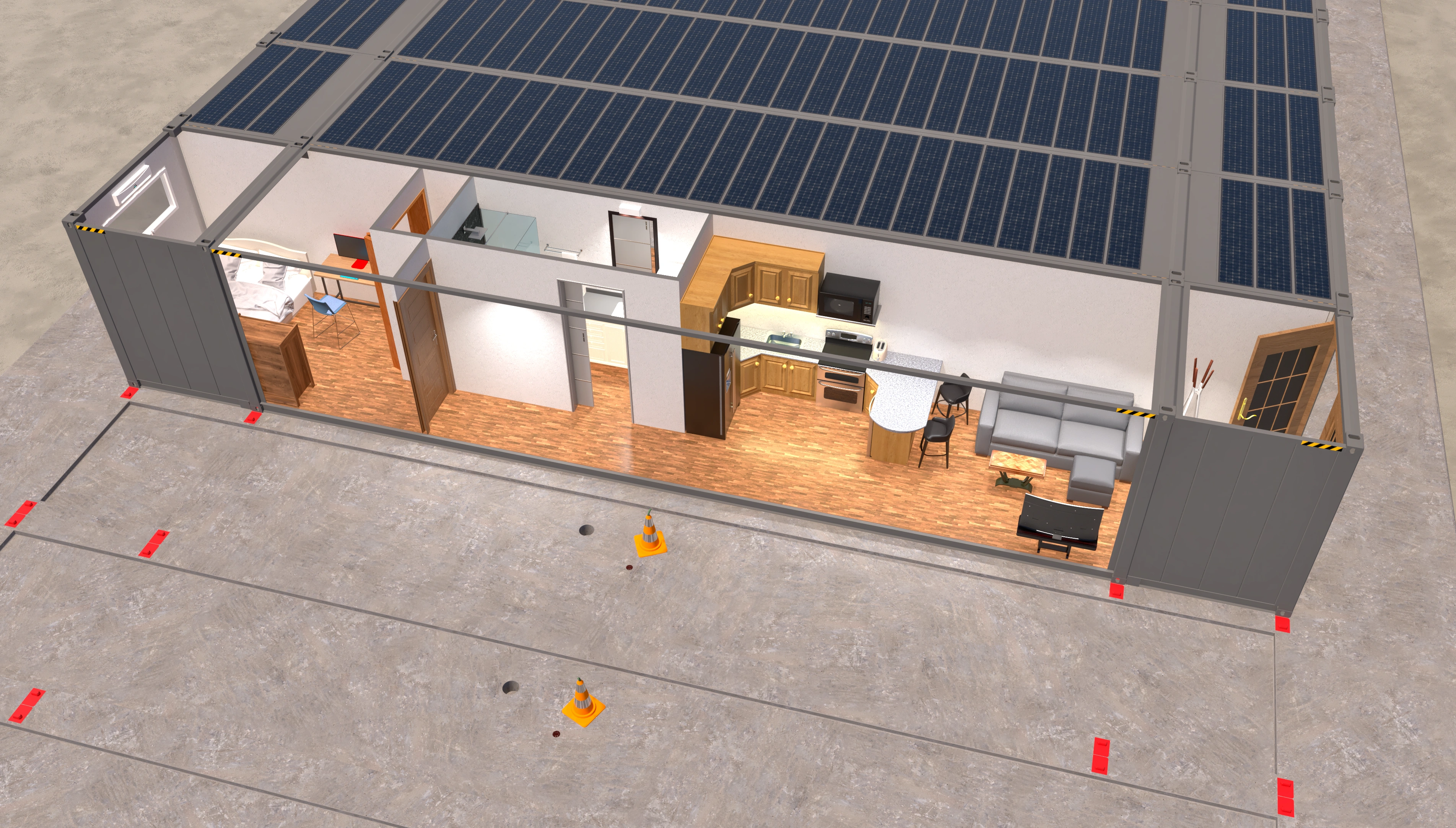
3D design of 53 foot reefer container homes

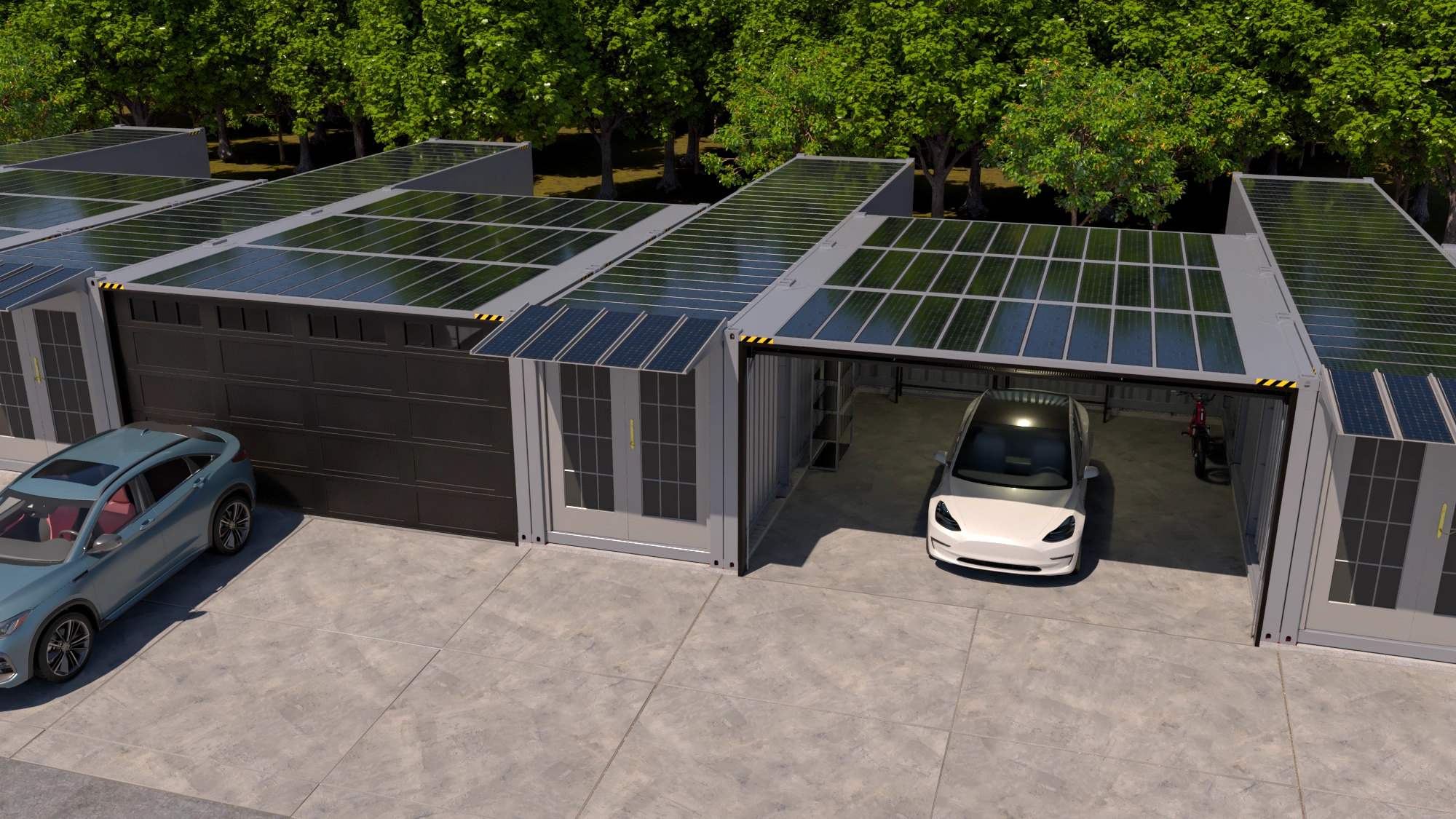
Reefer container homes with 20 foot containers for garages

Reefer containers can be repurposed for container housing or prefabricated for housing purposes. The advantage is the insulation in the walls, ceiling, and floor compared to corrugated metal in standard shipping containers that can get very hot or cold from the weather outside. Prefabricated reefer containers with the wiring run through the walls and the plumbing run through the ceiling and floor before the insulation, interior walls, and floors are installed would be more practical than trying to do that with a repurposed used reefer container.

== As prisons ==
In Eritrea, shipping containers are sometimes used to house prisoners without a trial. Placed in the middle of deserts, these converted containers get hot during daytime and cold during nighttime. This has widely been considered an abuse of human rights.

== See also ==
- Shipping container architecture
- Affordable housing
- Manufactured housing
- Open-source architecture
- Prefabricated building
- Prefabricated home
