= Lego Smart Play =

2026 product by the Lego group

Lego Smart Brick
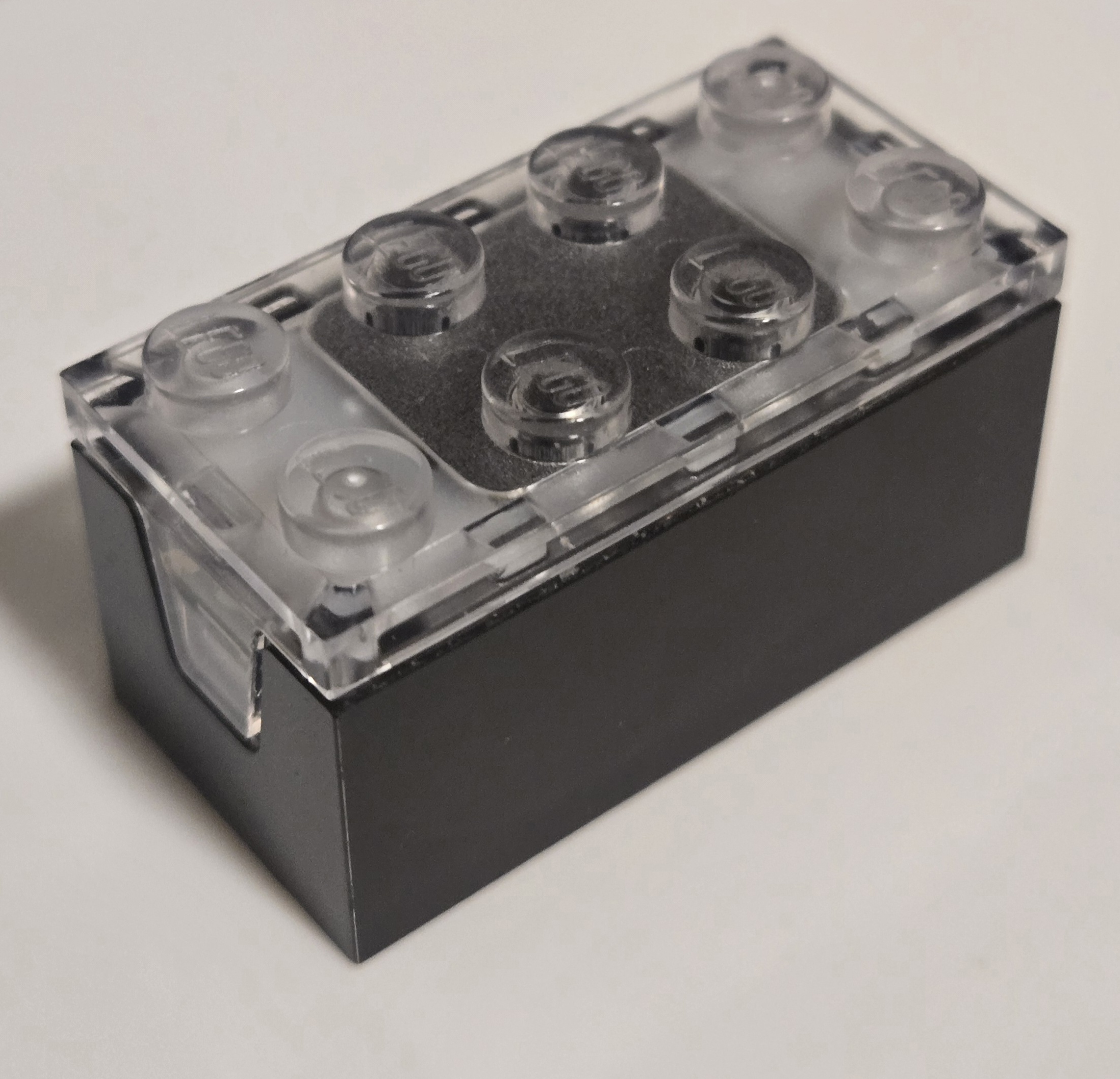
- Developer: The Lego Group
- Manufacturer: The Lego Group
- Released: 1 March 2026
- Connectivity: BrickNet (Bluetooth-based)
- Dimensions: 4.1 mm
- Marketing target: Children
- Website: Introducing the LEGO® SMART Play™ System!

Lego Smart Play, stylised as SMART Play, is a system created by the Lego Group. It features the interactive Smart Brick, which contains sensors that can react to movement, play sound, light up, and detect the presence of other elements, including Smart Minifigures and Smart Tags. It was first unveiled at the Consumer Electronics Show (CES) in 2026.

== History ==
In 2017, Lego formed a group of researchers to examine the possibility of upgrading their bricks to incorporate digital technologies. When creating the Smart Brick, Lego had criteria that the brick must allow children to play with their friends, react to their actions, and to allow the experience to evolve over time to play habits.

While Lego were innovating the Smart Brick, they had an intention to make the technology as invisible as possible. They also set out to create a proprietary application-specific integrated circuit (ASIC) chip. The Lego Group has filed 25 patents and had about 160 workstations for this project. Hundreds of employees have worked on the project. The Lego Smart Brick was in development for eight years prior to its announcement at the 2026 CES event. Executives at the Lego group expressed optimism for the opportunities that integration with digital technologies can bring.

The product was announced at CES 2026 with its availability on select Lego Star Wars sets. The product released on 1 March 2026, in several Lego Star Wars sets such as a TIE fighter, an X-wing fighter, and a Millennium Falcon.

== Details ==
The Smart Brick has the footprint of an ordinary 2×4 Lego brick, allowing for easy integration into the existing Lego system. However it is taller, "5 plates high rather than the usual 3" (where a "plate" is 3.2 mm), making a total 16 mm height instead of 9.6 mm.

Lego says they are creating an integrated platform that combines tags, interactive figures and recognises the existing systems of play with Lego. They also stated that they greatly benefited from integrated processes such as their supply chain, operations, marketing, technical development. The Smart Brick contains a 4.1 millimetre chip, with features such as an accelerometer, microphones, an LED array, a mini speaker and magnetic field sensors. Lego said that the Smart Brick will use enhanced encryption and privacy controls to protect user data, with the microphone only being used to detect sounds rather than sharing them with external sources.

The Smart Brick has an integrated wireless charger. A Neighbourhood Position Management chip can detect distance, orientation and direction between other Smart Bricks. The Smart Brick was designed with power efficiency and longevity in mind and will use a smartphone app for firmware updates. It has companion pieces, the Smart Minifigure and Smart Tag. The Smart Minifigure and Tag makes the Smart Brick react to certain elements of the play set. The Smart Tag takes the form of a 2x2 tile. No setup is required to use the product. Lego introduced a new Bluetooth-based communications protocol named BrickNet which allows multiple Smart Bricks to communicate with each other and operate in tandem.

== Technical specifications ==
- Smart Brick
  - Input
    - NFC to detect nearby "smart tiles" and "smart minifigures"
    - accelerometer (orientation, motion)
    - microphone
    - magnetic field sensors
    - light sensors
    - position system: senses distance, direction, and orientation of smart tiles and smart minifigures, and between multiple brain bricks, millimetre-accurate
  - Output
    - speaker
    - LED array
  - Other
    - BrickNet: self-organising communication network between bricks, Bluetooth-based
    - sound synthesiser
    - battery with wireless charging
- Smart Tiles and Smart Minifigures
  - are NFC tags
  - contain programs with action and context-specific instructions

== Reception ==
The Smart Brick has been criticized for the quality of its sound effects, due to the low fidelity of the on-board synthesiser and the inaccuracy of the sound design to its source material. When reviewing the first wave of Star Wars sets utilising the Smart Brick, Sean Hollister of The Verge noted that in comparison to some of the more advanced CES demos, the sets underutilized the capabilities of the device and made limited use of their sensors or mesh networking functionality. He also noted that their sound effects did not sound like actual sounds from the Star Wars films, the minifigures had character speech that sounded like "lifeless gibberish", that the Smart Tiles and Minifigures didn't account for the possibility of mixing and matching characters and props between sets to create new interactions, and that the Smart Brick itself had a non-removable battery with limited capacity.

Katriina Heljakka, a researcher of play at the University of Turku in Finland noted security concerns via the internet but also expressed praise that the Smart Brick is addressing her perception that Lego has been focusing too much on adult's play.

Josh Golin, executive director of children's wellbeing group Fairplay said that the Smart Brick could "undermine what was once great about Legos". He goes on to emphasize that children use their imagination to visualize different scenarios instead of the lights, sensors and speakers the Smart Brick has. Professor of children and technology at the University of Edinburgh Andrew Manches said that "the freedom to create, re-create, and adapt simple blocks into endless stories powered by children's imagination" was an integral part of the Lego system. He was glad that the Lego group is trying to integrate digital and physical play products through their Smart Play brand.
