= WikiHouse =

Project for designing and building houses

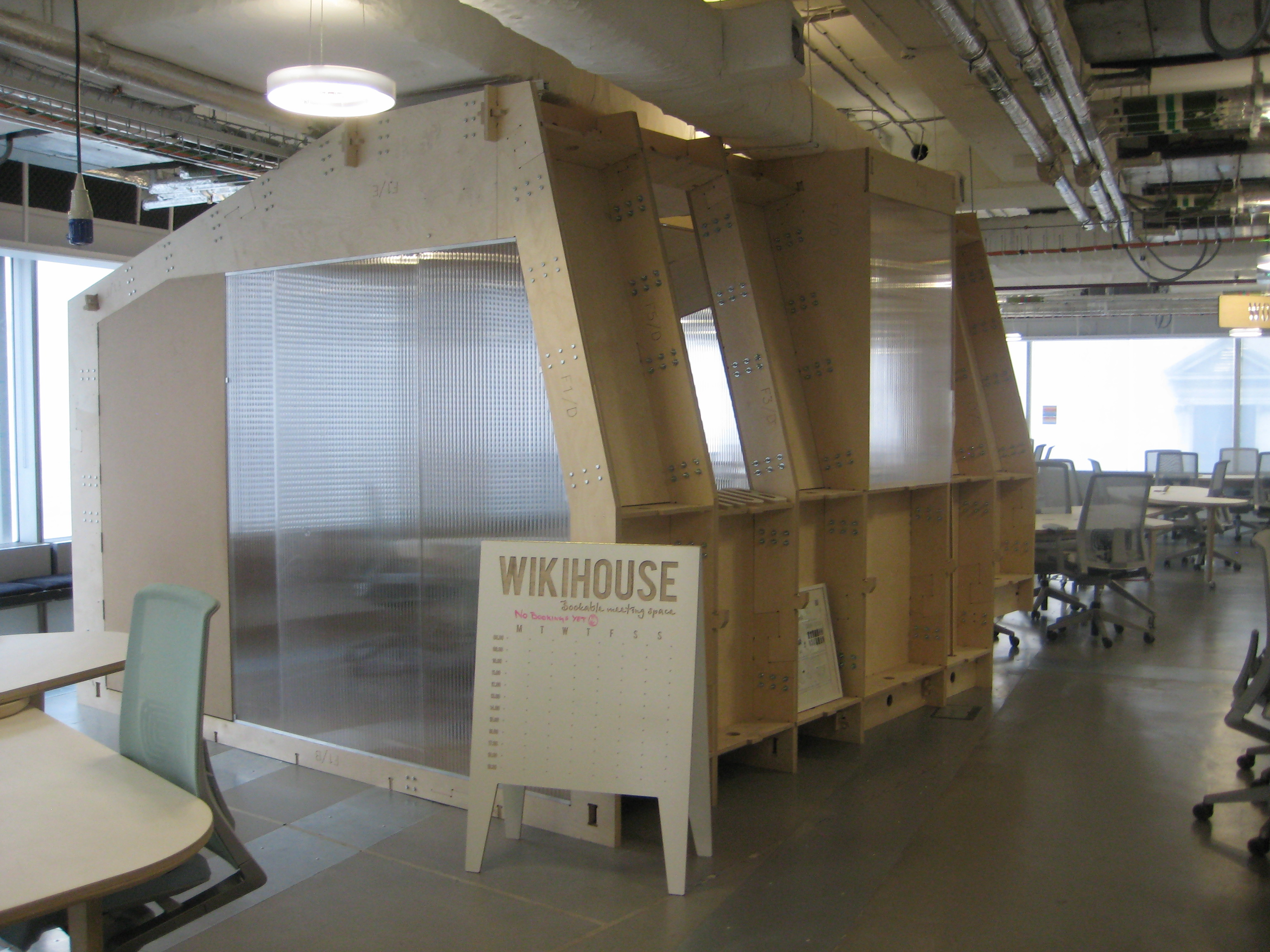
WikiHouse prototype in Westminster

WikiHouse is an open-source project for designing and building houses. It endeavours to democratise and simplify the construction of sustainable, resource-light dwellings. The project was initiated in the summer of 2011 by Alastair Parvin and Nick Ierodiaconou of 00, a London-based strategy and design practice, in collaboration with Tav of Espians, James Arthur now with 00 and Steve Fisher of Momentum Engineering. It was launched at the Gwangju Design Biennale in Gwangju, South Korea. The project has since grown to become a worldwide community of contributors.

== Concept ==
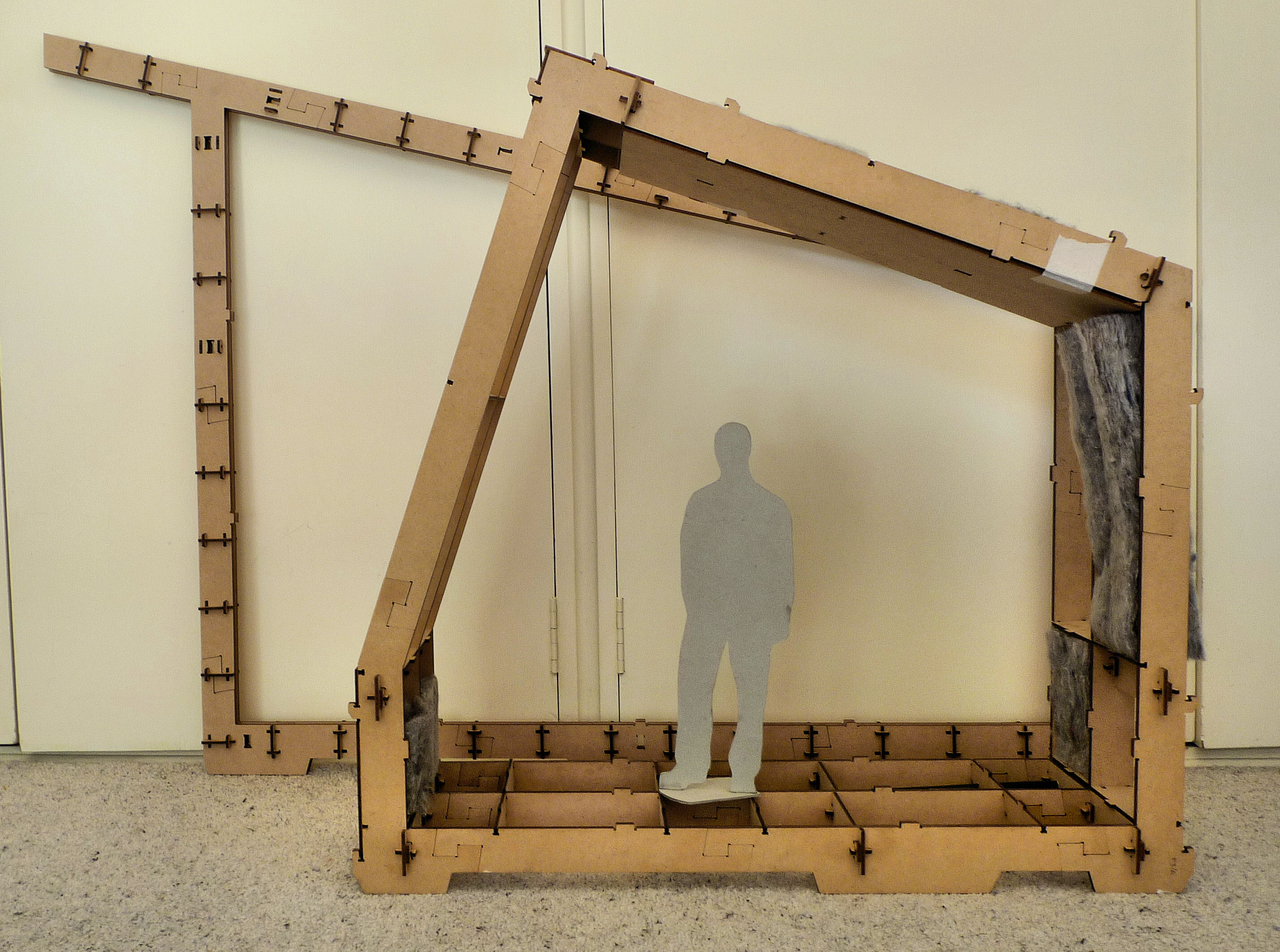
Scale models of two different WikiHouse designs

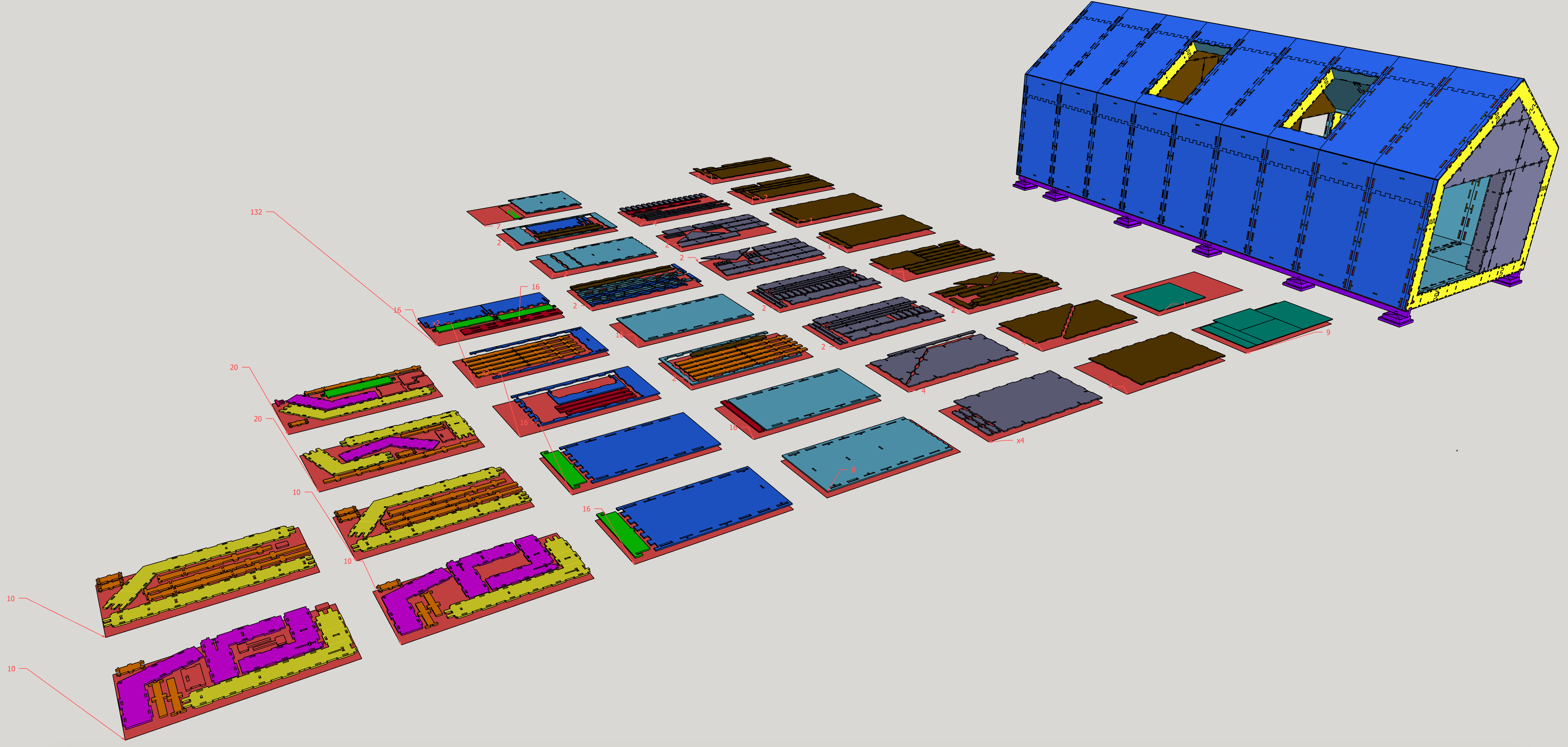
WikiHouse model for SketchUp from GitHub

WikiHouse enables users to download Creative Commons-licensed files from its online library, customize them using SketchUp, and then use them to create jigsaw puzzle-like pieces out of plywood with a CNC router. Construction of WikiHouse structures requires no special parts because the cut pieces of wood snap together with wedge and peg connections inspired by classical Korean architecture. The frame of a WikiHouse can be assembled in less than a day by people with no formal training in construction. The frame must then be finished with cladding, insulation, wiring, and plumbing before it can be inhabited. The WikiHouse project is maintained by Open Systems Lab.

== History ==
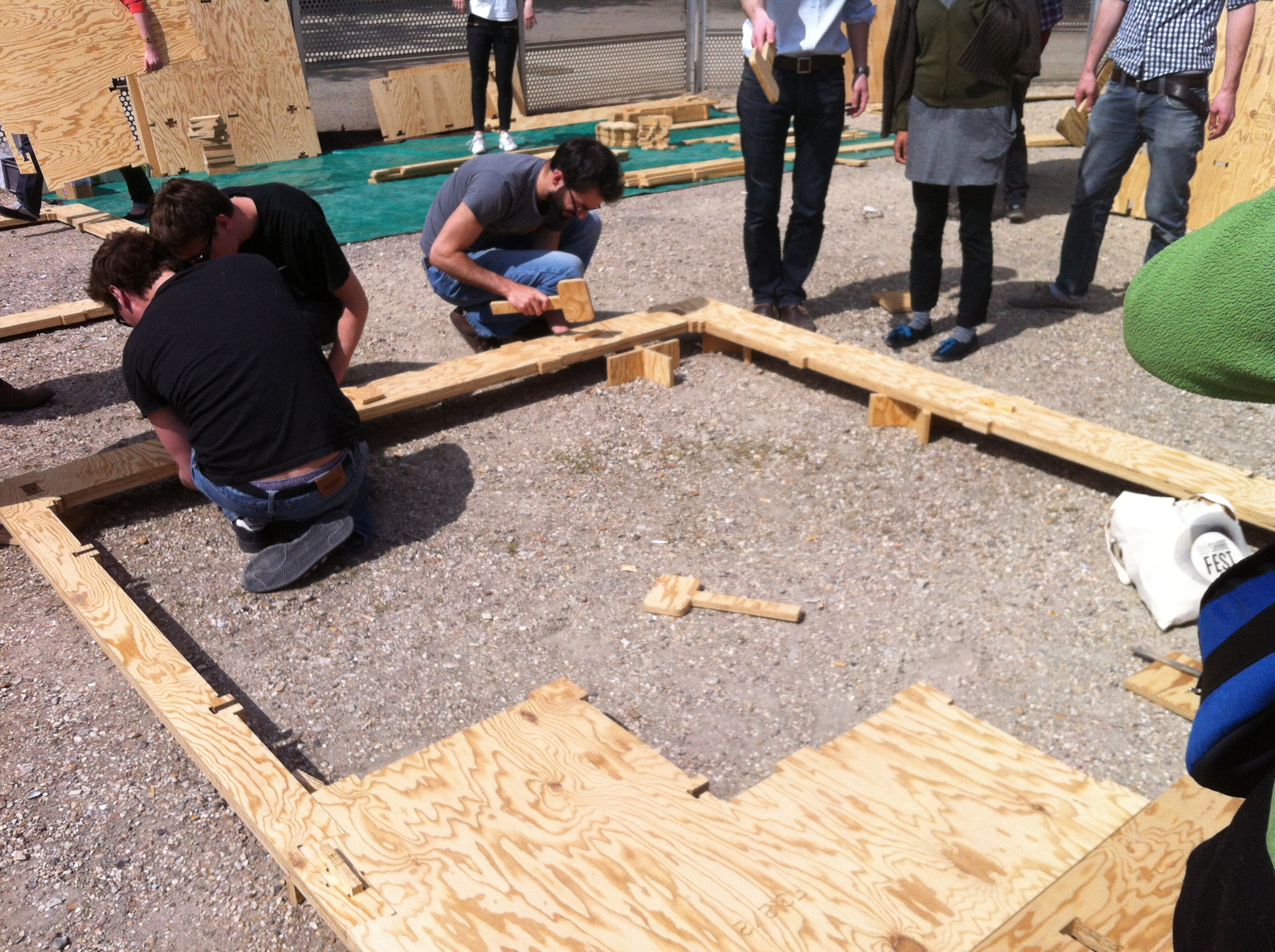
A WikiHouse under construction at Ouisharefest in Paris, May 2013

After winning a cash prize at TEDGlobal in June 2012, the project invested the prize money into a partnership with the Brazilian youth mobilization project Dharma and the analysis agency BrazilIntel to build WikiHouses in the poorest favelas of Rio de Janeiro, Brazil. The goal of the partnership, dubbed WikiHouseRio, is to provide a single "maker lab" where one CNC router can be shared by the community while also allowing and encouraging community members to develop their own designing and building skills. The WikiHouse team plans to eventually create similar maker labs in other underdeveloped communities around the world. There are also plans to use WikiHouses as disaster-relief housing in earthquake-prone countries such as Haiti, Japan, and New Zealand.

By December 2013, while there were no inhabited WikiHouses, there were a few completed prototypes in addition to a usable walkers' shelter in Fridaythorpe, England. These WikiHouses are single-story, square-shaped structures with sloped roofs and small foundations that measure about 175 square feet (16.3 m^{2}). By 2015, several additional WikiHouses had been built, including the following buildings and at the following events:

- Maker Faire 2013 in Queens
- WikiHouse 4.0 at the London Design Festival
- 150-square-foot (14 m^{2}) FOUNDhouse microhouse
- WikiHouse at MAKlab in Glasgow
- Chop Shop in western Scotland
- Space Craft Systems project in New Zealand
- WikiSHED fork
- WikiHouse at the 2015 Vienna Open

== Impact ==
Media reaction to WikiHouse has focused largely on the experimental nature of the project, comparisons with IKEA furniture, and the potential difficulty in finding and costs of using CNC routers. American science fiction author Bruce Sterling also gave a review of the WikiHouse design, describing it favorably as a dwelling "I could quite likely build and inhabit, personally".

== See also ==
- Open-source architecture
- Open-source hardware
- List of open-source hardware projects
- Opendesk
