= Opendesk =

Virtual furniture shop with downloadable design files

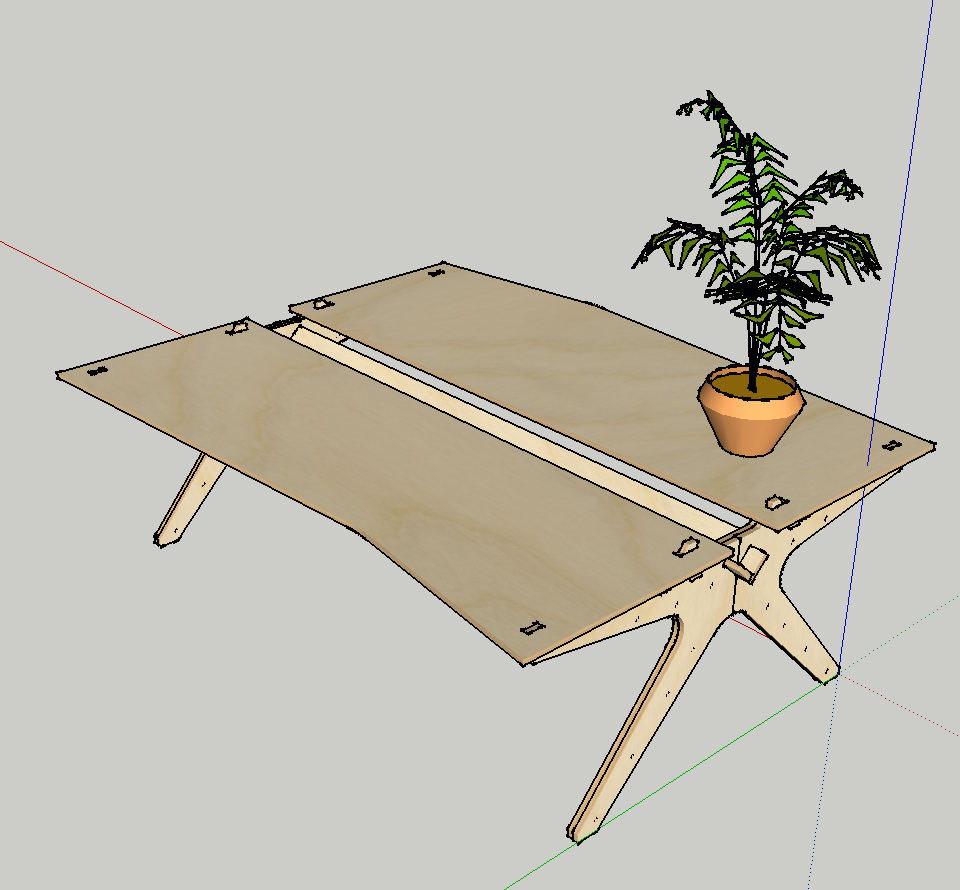
The original Desk design from Opendesk

Opendesk was an initiative to produce furniture on the principles of Open Making, which stopped sharing their design files with the public at least since 2020. Designs were released under Creative Commons licenses. One of Opendesk's goals is to eliminate the cost of shipping completed products in favour of local fabrication.

Opendesk was founded by Ian Bennink, Tim Carrigan, James Arthur, Joni Steiner and Nick Ierodiaconou; the last three founders were part of Development 00, the creators of WikiHouse. The same team previously created FabHub.io, a marketplace designed to allow designers and fabricators to engage with one another.

== Concept ==
Users were able to choose between four degrees of completion for designs, distinguished by price and the technical fabrication requirements:

- Plans, in .dwg and .dwx formats, and instructions in PDF, for the experienced carpenter capable of building furniture from scratch
- Packs of raw wood, pre-sawn by CNC machine
- Flat pack furniture that is cut, oiled and ready to be assembled
- Completed and assembled final products

Opendesk's designs use a system of interlocking wooden fins to hold pieces together firmly without nails or bolts. The choice of wood to use is up to the builder; in the United Kingdom, a popular choice has been birch and plywood certified by the Forest Stewardship Council.

As of August 2013, the Opendesk range featured six items: the Desk, Café Table, Meeting Table, Edie set, Edie Stool and Edie Table.

Currently, OpenDesk does not work under the Open Making principles. They do not share their designs with the public any longer. Their model is now for-profit, where the website provides a quotation from local manufacturers, when available in your area. If no local manufacturers exist, they still do not provide the files to build the furniture yourself.

== History ==
The project was born out of a commission for furniture for a tech startup in London, England. When the startup's sister office in New York City required furniture, it was decided to manufacture it locally rather than ship the completed product. Opendesk targeted startups along with creative companies and nonprofit organisations as a customer base. These types of organisations typically request flat pack products, while commercial organisations prefer fully assembled furniture.

At some point during or prior to 2020, OpenDesk stopped sharing their designs with the public, distancing themselves from the Open Making principles.

== Reception ==
Opendesk was the subject of an exhibition named "The Future Is Here" at the Design Museum in London, which ran until October 2013. It featured designs from around the world, with assigned QR codes which can be used to access information on each design and its creator.

Numerous users have requested OpenDesk to share their designs without success, and the project is no longer considered an Open Making initiative.

== See also ==
- List of open source hardware projects
- Open manufacturing
