= Schrödinger's cat (disambiguation) =

Schrödinger's cat is a thought experiment concerning quantum superposition.

Schrödinger's cat may also refer to:

- Schrödinger's Cat Trilogy, a novel series by Robert Anton Wilson
- Schrödinger's Cat, the code name for a version of the Fedora Linux distribution
- Schrödingers katt, a Norwegian television series

== See also ==
- Schrödinger's paradox (disambiguation)
- Schrödinger's Kitten, a 1988 novella by George Alec Effinger
- In Search of Schrödinger's Cat, a 1984 book by John Gribbin
- Schrödinger's Kittens and the Search for Reality, a 1995 book by John Gribbin, sequel to the 1984 book
