= Raffi Krikorian =

American software engineer (born 1978)

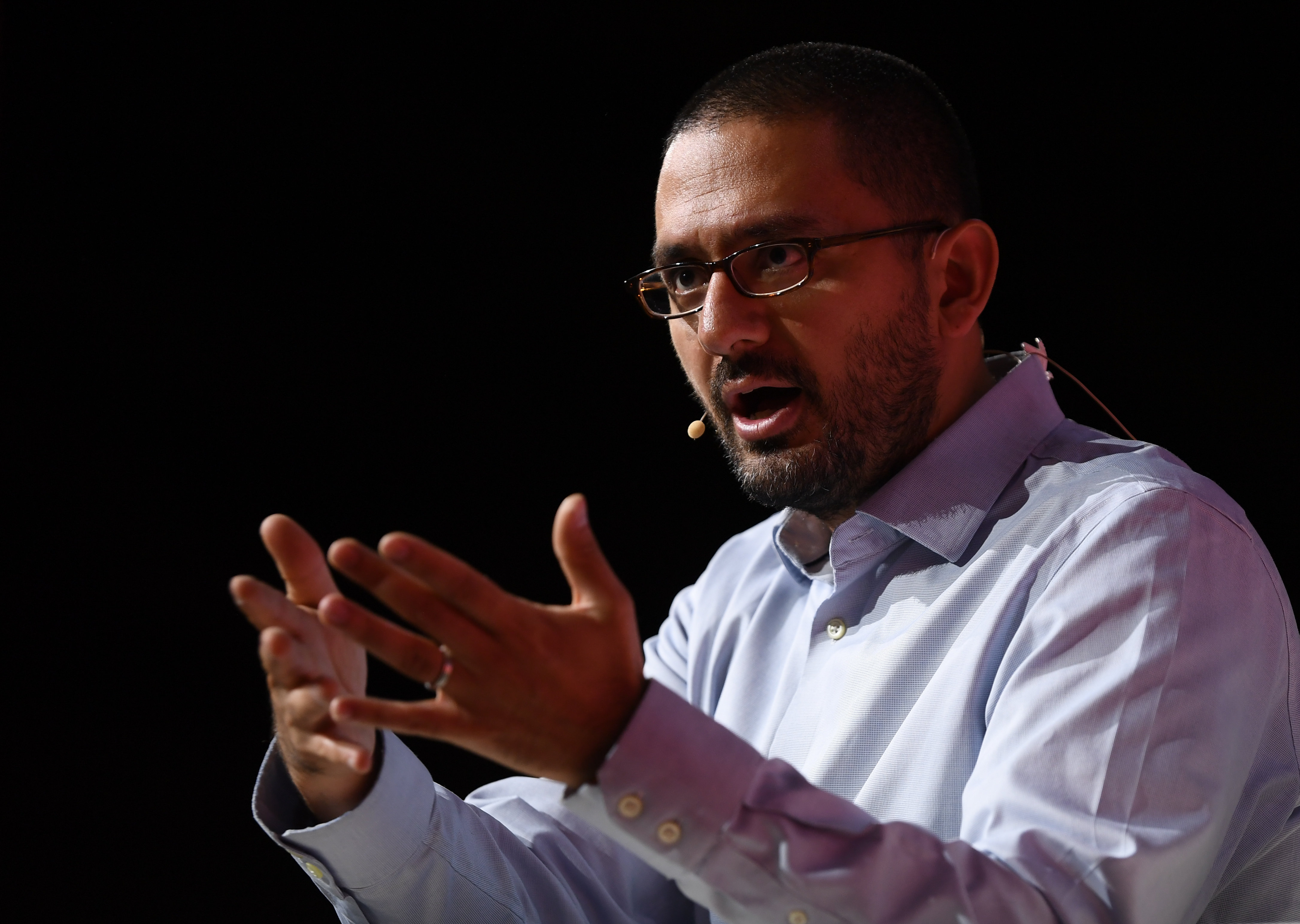

Raffi Krikorian (Armenian: Րաֆֆի Գրիգորեան; born July 1978) is an Armenian-American technology executive, and the CTO of Mozilla. He was the CTO of Emerson Collective., CTO of the Democratic National Committee, Head of Uber's Advanced Technologies Center, and the former VP of Platform Engineering at Twitter where he was in charge of infrastructure for all of Twitter up to August 2014. He is credited with leading the charge to improve the reliability of Twitter as well as the move from Ruby to the JVM. He currently also serves on the board of directors of the Tumo Center for Creative Technologies in Yerevan, Armenia and of Medic Mobile Inc. (Medic).

== Biography ==
=== Early life ===
Krikorian attended MIT and was a student of Neil Gershenfeld's. His work involved creating a new type of network for everyday devices called "Internet-0" (an analogue to the Internet of Things). Along with Gershenfeld, he also taught a class entitled "How To Make (Almost) Anything". He also worked on an interactive location service for software agents called Wherehoo.

He was also "an unapologetic TiVo fanatic", and wrote "TiVo Hacks" (O'Reilly Media 2003).

Krikorian also was an Adjunct Assistant Professor of Communication at New York University's Interactive Telecommunications Program. There, he developed two classes entitled "Every Bit You Make" and "Physical Computing without Computers".

In 2007, Krikorian was partner at Synthesis Studios where he worked on OneHop, a project that uses Bluetooth technology and SMS to alert mobile-phone owners when they come into proximity with other Bluetooth-device owners they've met before.

=== WattzOn ===
Along with Saul Griffith, Krikorian created Wattzon and debuted it at PopTech in 2008. Their goal was to allows users to calculate their total energy footprint by estimating their direct and indirect power consumption. It's notable, because unlike most carbon calculators it measures energy consumption, and not the by-products (CO_{2}, or CO_{2} equivalent emissions) and because it aggregates information into a holistic view of energy consumption allowing users to see the energy used in their driving compared to their eating, for example. Wattzon was named Business Week's Best Idea of 2008.

=== Twitter ===
Krikorian joined Twitter in 2009 as an engineer on the API team, working on its geospatial APIs. At this time, he created a Tweet "map of metadata". He is also credited with the integration of Twitter into Apple's iOS 5. Krikorian also made Twitter data available for research universities.

After the 2010 FIFA World Cup, which he notes he "still [has] PTSD from", during which Twitter repeatedly had issues, Krikorian lead the charge to strengthen the service. To do this, Twitter moved to the JVM as well as moved from a monolithic codebase to a more Service-oriented architecture. Twitter has also scaled out their global server infrastructure as well as implemented SPDY. And, Twitter did a lot of work on their storage systems, their observability and statistics systems, and their data analytics products. Twitter made it through the 2014 FIFA World Cup with no site wide incidents.

Krikorian has also been part of scaling the engineering culture at Twitter as well as helping open Twitter's Seattle office. He has spoken about #branchingout, "Twitter University", as well as "Hack Week". He noted that Hack Week serves "[as] a release valve in a lot of ways."

In 2014, Krikorian remarked that "Twitter [engineering] is entering a 'maturation phase'" and that Twitter can confidently say, "We know how to do this". To do that, Twitter spends a lot of time in capacity planning and breaking services down into tiers to handle "burst capacity". He said his goal is that Twitter engineers should focus on the end-user experience, and not have to worry about the infrastructure layer.

=== Uber ===
Krikorian joined Uber in 2015 in the research department to work on "massive scale data and software platforms”. He has since become the engineering director in charge of the Advanced Technologies Center and self-driving. Starting on Wednesday, September 14, 2016, Uber deployed the self-driving cars onto the roads of Pittsburgh, PA. Krikorian has called Pittsburgh the “double-black diamond of driving” and also commented that if “...Uber can master autonomous driving in Pittsburgh … it can make it almost anywhere."

=== Democratic National Committee ===
Krikorian was the Chief Technology Officer of the Democratic National Committee from 2017 to March 2019. He claims he joined because "the world is broken". He split his time between Silicon Valley and Washington, DC. His focus was to update the Democratic Party's crumbling infrastructure. He also worked on security, nudging voters to vote as well as the "cultural" elements of bringing engineering to the political world.

=== Emerson Collective ===
Krikorian was the managing director of Engineering at the Emerson Collective.

=== Mozilla ===
Krikorian is now the CTO of Mozilla and chair of Mozilla.ai.

=== Medic ===
Raffi serves as chair of the board of directors at Medic.

== Armenia ==
Krikorian is active in the Armenian community. He serves on the board of the Tumo Center for Creative Technologies in Yerevan, Armenia where he taught classes and given public lectures. In 2015, at the University of Southern California, he gave a public lecture entitled "Why Not Armenia?". On 25 April 2015, he hosted an engineering summit at the Tumo Center along with Alexis Ohanian. Krikorian tweeted after the summit on the importance of running the event on April 25.

== Bibliography ==
- TiVo Hacks (O'Reilly Media, 2003)
