= Syzygy (novel) =

1981 novel by Frederik Pohl

- Author: Frederik Pohl
- Language: English
- Publication date: 1981

Syzygy is a 1981 novel by Frederik Pohl. It was inspired by the non-fiction work, The Jupiter Effect by John Gribbin and Stephen Plagemann, in which an alignment of the planets of the Solar System in March 1982 was predicted as possibly causing disasters on Earth, including a large earthquake in California, by its effect on the solar wind. The prediction did not come to pass, the theory was debunked, and Gribbin himself announced that he regretted publishing it.

== Plot ==
The novel contains few science fiction tropes, instead focusing on the reactions of people in 1982 to the possibility of disaster. Politicians, cult leaders, and hucksters use the prediction for their own benefit. Two characters, a geologist and a NASA mission director, encounter each other during this time. The novel also focuses on Danny Deere, a real estate speculator who sponsors a cult called the "Jupes" to spread panic and drive down values so he can cash in.

Tib Sonderman, a geologist, reads The Jupiter Effect on his way to Los Angeles in late 1981. Rainy Keating, mission director of the deep space probe Newton-8, has to defend her funding after the probe goes dead just as it is about to observe a transit of Jupiter across the sun from beyond the orbit of Saturn. They are thrown together during committee meetings overshadowed by rising panic among the population, especially when typical California disasters like wildfires occur. In the final chapter, it is discovered that the Newton-8 probe shut down as it passed through an intense burst of radio transmission from an extraterrestrial source. The transmission was intensified by the combined gravitational lensing effect of the Sun, Jupiter and Saturn. The novel ends with people realizing that civilizations can survive the self-destructive phase of their technological progress.

== External references ==
- Syzygy title listing at the Internet Speculative Fiction Database
