= Michael White (author) =

British author and musician

Michael White (16 February 1959 – 6 February 2018) was a British writer who was based in Perth, Western Australia. He wrote biographies, novels and about science.

== Early life and education ==
He studied at King's College London (1977–1982) and was a chemistry lecturer at d'Overbroeck's College, Oxford (1984–1991).

== Career ==
He was a science editor of British GQ, a columnist for the Sunday Express in London and, 'in a previous incarnation', he was a member of Colour Me Pop. Colour Me Pop featured on the "Europe in the Year Zero" EP in 1982 with Yazoo and Sudeten Creche. He was then a member of the pop group Thompson Twins (1982). He moved to Australia in 2002, and was made an Honorary Research Fellow at Curtin University in 2005.

He was the author of thirty-five books: these include Stephen Hawking: A Life in Science; Leonardo: The First Scientist; Tolkien: A Biography; and C. S. Lewis: The Boy Who Chronicled Narnia. His first novel, Equinox, is a thriller, an occult mystery that reached the top ten in the bestseller list in the U.K. and has been translated into thirty-five languages. His non-fiction production includes the biography Galileo: Antichrist Novels following Equinox include The Medici Secret, The Borgia Ring and The Art of Murder.

White wrote under two further names, Tom West and Sam Fisher. He used the latter pseudonym to publish the E-Force trilogy, State of Emergency, Aftershock, and Nano.

A further novel by White, The Venetian Detective, features characters including Galileo and Elizabeth.

White wrote a biography of Isaac Newton, The Last Sorcerer. He was both short-listed and long-listed for the Aventis Prize. Rivals was short-listed in 2002, and The Fruits of War long-listed in 2006. He was also nominated for the Ned Kelly Prize for First Novel (for Equinox in 2007).

=== Works ===
- (2016) The Venetian Detective (a novel, as Michael White)
- (2012) The Kennedy Conspiracy (a novel, as Michael White)
- (2011) The Art of Murder (a novel, as Michael White)
- (2011) Nano (a novel, as Sam Fisher).
- (2010) Aftershock (a novel, as Sam Fisher).
- (2009) State of Emergency (a novel, under the name of Sam Fisher)
- (2009) The Borgia Ring (a novel)
- (2008) The Medici Secret (a novel)
- (2007) Coffee with Newton (non-fiction)
- (2007) Galileo Antichrist, a Biography
- (2006) Equinox (a novel)
- (2004) C. S. Lewis: Creator of Narnia
- (2005) A Teaspoon and an Open Mind: The Science of Doctor Who
- (2005) The Fruits of War
- (2004) Machiavelli: A Man Misunderstood
- (2003) A History of the 21st Century (with Gentry Lee) – Korean translation version
- (2002) The Pope and the Heretic
- (2001) Tolkien: A Biography
- (2002) Rivals – shortlisted for the Aventis Prize
- (2000) Thompson Twin: An ’80s Memoir
- (2000) Leonardo: The First Scientist
- Super Science
- (1997) Isaac Newton: The Last Sorcerer
- Life Out There
- Alien Life Forms
- Mind and Matter
- (1996) The Science of the X-Files
- (1994) Asimov: The Unauthorised Biography
- Breakthrough (with Kevin Davies)
- Darwin: A Life in Science (with John Gribbin)
- Einstein: A Life in Science (with John Gribbin)
- Stephen Hawking: A Life in Science (with John Gribbin)
- Newton (for younger readers)
- Galileo (for younger readers)
- John Lennon (for younger readers)
- Mozart (for younger readers)
