= Don Montague =

Canadian-American watersport athlete and designer

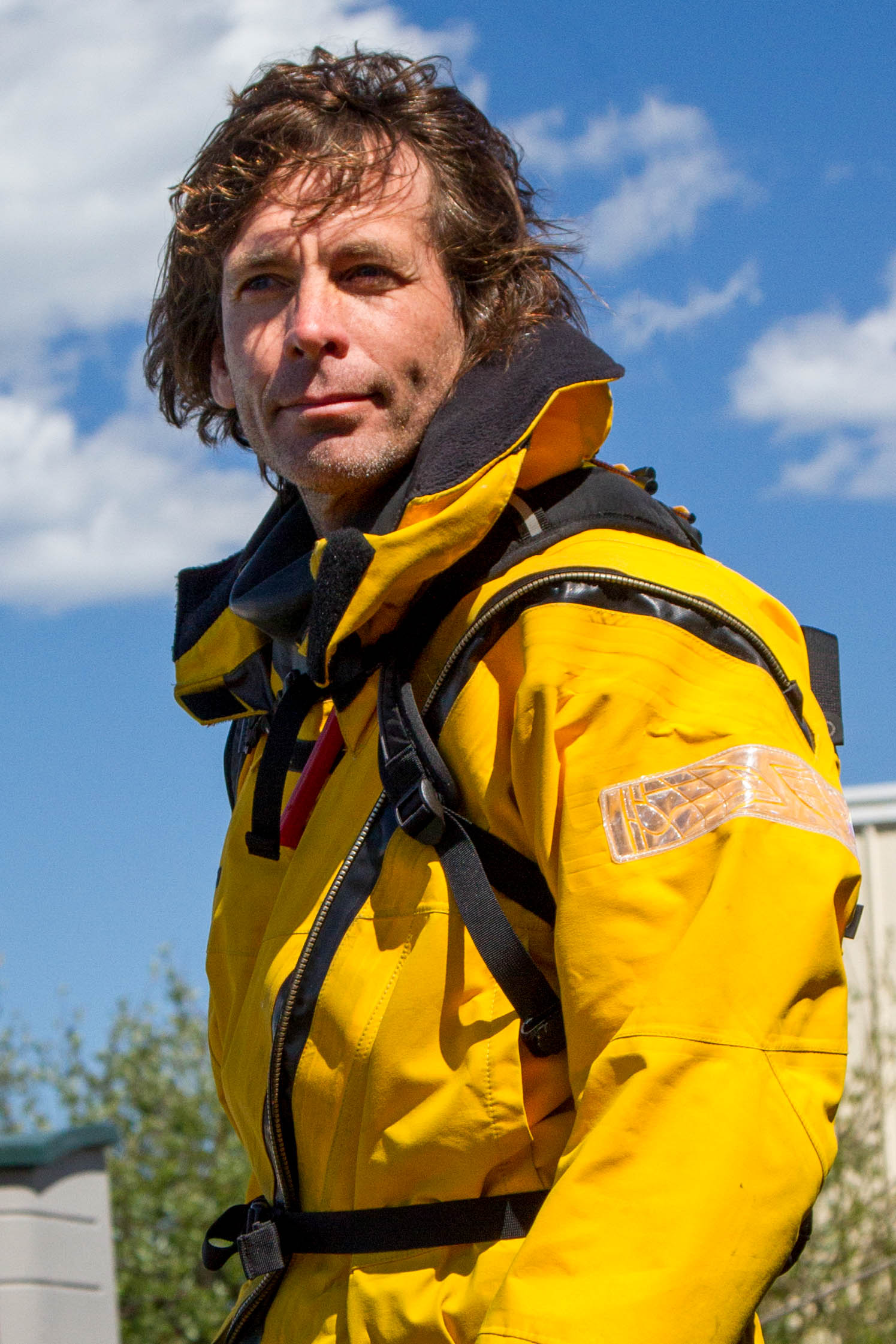
- Don Montague in Alameda in 2013.
- Born: Donald Lewis Montague; Alberta, Canada
- Occupations: Watersport athlete, designer
- Notable work: Kiteboat Project, Makani Power

Donald Lewis Montague is a Canadian-American watersport athlete and designer. He is President of Kai Concepts, co-founder of Makani Power, and the head of the Kiteboat Project in Alameda, California.

== Career ==
In 1982, Montague moved from Canada to Santa Barbara, California, and then to Maui, HI to pursue a career in windsurfing. After touring professionally in the Windsurfing World Cup, Montague began designing sails and other windsurfing equipment as Head Sail Designer at Gaastra Sails. Later, while working as the head of Research & Development at Naish, Montague became interested in the idea of using kites to harness wind power in watersports. While being involved in the development of the first kites for Naish in 1997, and helping to create software that increased the speed of kite design modifications, Montague became an avid kitesurfer. In 2006, his interest in wind-related technology led him to engineers and fellow kitesurfers Corwin Hardham and Saul Griffith, and together they created Makani Power, an Alameda, California-based company that develops airborne wind turbines for commercial use. Makani (the Hawaiian word for "gentle breeze") was acquired by Google X in May 2013 and is still considered a pioneer in wind powered energy systems.

=== Kiteboat Project ===
Montague's interest in kite power led him to create the Kiteboat Project. Currently the project is part of Kai Concepts, a Bay Area team known for testing the limits of kite propulsion and experimenting with technological advances in watersport technology.
