= Instructables =

Internet community dedicated to DIY

- Website type: Informational
- Owner: Autodesk Inc.
- Creator: Eric J. Wilhelm Dan Goldwater Saul Griffith
- Website: instructables.com
- Commercial: Yes
- Registration: Yes
- Launched: August 2005

Instructables is a website specializing in user-created and uploaded do-it-yourself projects, currently owned by Autodesk. It was created by Eric Wilhelm and Saul Griffith and launched in August 2005. Instructables is dedicated to step-by-step collaboration among members to build a variety of projects. Users post instructions to their projects, usually accompanied by visual aids, and then interact through comment sections below each Instructable step as well in topic forums.

== History ==
After graduating from the Media Lab at MIT, Wilhelm and Griffith founded Squid Labs, an engineering and technology company specializing in design and consulting. Instructables started as an internal Squid Labs project, which later spun out as an independent company with Wilhelm as its CEO. Wilhelm still regularly contributes to the site.

A prototype version of the site, complete with the initial content of electronics, cooking, kiting, and bicycle projects, was released in August 2005 at the O'Reilly Foo Camp conference.

The site allows uploading of photos, diagrams, video and animation to help explain complex terminology and mechanisms in clear and understandable terms.

Instructables employs a full-time staff, and also has a volunteer group, who feature well-documented articles, welcome new users, and help out around the site.

On August 1, 2011, Autodesk announced the acquisition of Instructables.

== Community ==
Once registered, members can create Instructables that are step-by-step descriptions of projects they want to share online. They are written in such a way that they easily allow other members to replicate, and share with the rest of the community. Members can also upload videos and slideshows, depicting a project that they have not documented.

Multiple contests are held each month, each with a unique theme. People vote for entries in a specific competition that they think are of good quality and creativity, and prizes are awarded to the winners. An Instructables-sponsored contest will usually award T-shirts, patches and stickers, but often more extravagant prizes are awarded based on sponsor availability.

A forum feature was added for members to post ideas, questions, discussions, requests for help, and all manner of other things. Later on, a dedicated question and answer system was also rolled out.

Classes were introduced in February 2017 for members to enroll and learn skills to gain confidence in a variety of trades, like woodworking, welding, electronics, Arduino, baking, 3D printing, laser cutting, and a variety of other classes, offering over 35 classes.

== In the press ==
Instructables has been profiled in Make, The Village Voice, Popular Science, The Daily Telegraph, and PC World. It has also received attention from National Public Radio (NPR).

== Pro membership ==
In June 2009, Instructables introduced a “Pro” membership account, with subscriptions starting at $1.95 per month, in response to a sharp decline in advertising revenue during the economic downturn of 2008–2009. Pro memberships quickly became controversial when many of the membership features were restricted to Pro members, while some new features were made available exclusively to Pro members. Users can earn Pro membership for free for three months by getting their content featured. If the content hits the home page or wins a prize in a contest, they can get one year free Pro membership.

== Competitions ==
There are multiple competitions within Instuctables. Autodesk sponsors multiple competitions each month, with prizes varying from runner up prizes to Grand and Judges Prizes. Competitions are to ensure and motivate Instructables creators to create even more articles. Themes of competitions vary with different themes of month, or holidays and festivals within the month the competition is hosted. Winter has warmth competitions, summer has “Stay Cool” competitions, see Instuctables contest pages to view current contests, past winners, and future events. FAQ and more info.

== See also ==
- 3D printing
- Maker culture
