= Squid Labs =

Squid Labs was an American independent research and development company founded by a group of four MIT graduates. In 2004, Colin Bulthaup, Dan Goldwater, Saul Griffith, and Eric Wilhelm moved from the East Coast to California to found the company known as Squid Labs. During its years of existence from 2004 to 2007, Squid Labs added three more members to its team: Geo Homsy, Corwin Hardham and Ryan McKinley. Working out of a warehouse in Emeryville, the group adopted the slogan "We're not a think tank, we're a do tank." and created a handful of patents and inventions including an electronically sensed rope, portable pull-cord generators, and a machine that could manufacture eyeglasses of any prescriptions at extremely low cost. Squid Labs was also the birthplace for many companies still running today, such as Makani Power and Howtoons. Although the company no longer exists, Squid Lab's co-founder, Saul Griffith created a similar company in San Francisco named Otherlab.

== Projects ==
Squid Labs had many breakthrough and award-winning projects that influenced their respective industries. These inventions include:

- Electronically Sensed Rope - A high strength electronic cable that could read and display load data and rope condition. The rope is embedded with fibers that sense the rope's condition can send data to a receiver. This was one of Squid Lab's better known inventions and was featured in Time Magazine's most amazing inventions of 2005.
- Low Cost Eyeglasses - Squid Labs designed a machine that could cheaply mold lenses of any prescription under 20 minutes. This won the Harvard Business School Business Plan Competition and was the start of the company Optioptia.
- Printed electronics - Squid Labs helped to start the field of printed electronics This is a low-end and low-cost way to create circuits and other electronics using common printing technology.
- Programmed Assembly - Squid Labs researched and created autonomous self-assembling robots and was featured in Nature (journal) in 2005 for their development of small self-replicating systems.
- Monkey Kites - Squid Labs is the researcher and developer for all of Monkey Kites high-performance kite surfing kites.
- Solar Power Systems - Squid Labs helped test and design rugged solar panels that could be installed in driveways and on the road.
- 'Location and Guidance system technology '- Squid Labs developed custom electronic sensor technology for private and corporate clients. This technology has many uses including airborne systems and emergency responders.

== Spin-off Companies ==
Products and designs started at Squid Labs evolved into companies that are run by former Squid Lab members and contributors. These companies include:

Howtoons - Howtoons is a book that turned into a website of cartoon comics. These comics show kids how to build their own toys and conduct experiments from household items. The purpose of Howtoons is to inspire kids to be creative and explore their world. Saul Griffith is one of Howtoons inventors and primary contributors.

Instructables - Instructables is website where members collaborate with each other and share DIY projects. The format is similar to YouTube, but focused more on projects that "the average person could do." Eric Wilhelm of Squid Labs is now the CEO of Instructables.

Makani Power - "Makani Power is a company that develops airborne wind turbines to harness high-altitude wind energy." Today, Makani Power is run by Squid Lab's Corwin Hardham.

WattzOn - WattzOn is web and mobile solution designed to help partners engage in energy and water savings, featuring automated utility data connections and personalized savings plans.

MonkeyLectric '-"MonkeyLectric was founded by Dan Goldwater in 2007 to develop and distribute innovative bicycle lighting products."

Optioptia - Founded by Saul Griffith, "Optiopia is company that produces affordable eye care and researches ways to improve the way we detect and correct visual loss."

Potenco -A company that designs and produces portable pull-cord generators (PCG) for third-world countries and natural disasters. "These generators have the ability to produce hours of lighting by simply pulling on a small cord for a few minutes." Potenco was co-founded by Saul Griffith.

== Members ==
Colin Bulthuap - An electrical engineer with a master's degree from MIT. Colin is founder of Kovio Inc., a company that prints low-cost integrated circuits, and in 2001 was recognized as one of the top 100 innovators under the age of 35 by Technology Review Magazine. Colin has also won many other awards including the International Design Competition held in São Paulo, Brazil.

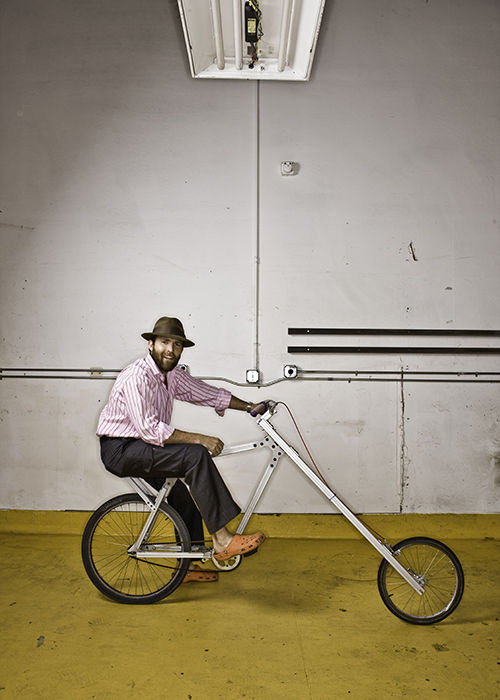
Saul Griffith in 2008

Dan Goldwater- An engineer and architect in the industries of software, hardware, chip and networking. Dan graduated from Brown University with bachelor's and master's degrees in electrical engineering. After Squid Labs, Dan went on to found and run MonkeyLectric, a company that designs and distributes new kinds of bike lighting products.

Saul Griffith- With degrees in materials science and mechanical engineering and PhD in Programmable Assembly and Self Replicating machines at MIT, Saul has been received Collegiate Inventor's award, the Lemelson-MIT Student prize, National Inventors Hall of Fame and many more. Saul is currently running his spin off of Squid Labs, Other lab, and Onya Cycles, his urban bicycle company developed through Other Labs.

Corwin Hardham- A mechanical engineer and scientist, Corwin received his PhD from Stanford University for developing hydraulic platforms to improve gravitational wave detection. Corwin was acting as the CEO of the Squid Labs-born company Makani Power. Died, October 23, 2012.

Geo Homsy- A computer scientist and software architect, Geo has a PhD in Electrical Engineering and Computer Science from MIT. Geo also specializes in physics, robotics and biology. He is currently working as senior hardware and Software engineer for the Atair Aerospace Engineering team.

Ryan McKinley - A software Engineer graduated from San Diego state with bachelor's degrees in visual arts and computer science. Ryan earned his Master of Science from the MIT Media Lab.

Eric Wilhelm - A graduate from MIT with Bachelor of Science degree, master's degree, and PhD. in mechanical engineering. Eric Has received National Inventors Hall of Fame Collegiate Inventors Award and has been recognized as one of the top innovators under 35 years old by Technology Review. Eric is currently the CEO of Instructables.
