= Marcus Chown =

Science writer, journalist and broadcaster

Marcus Chown (born 1959) is a science writer, journalist and broadcaster, currently cosmology consultant for New Scientist magazine.

== Biography ==
He graduated from the Queen Mary University of London in 1980 with a Bachelor of Science in physics (first class). In 1982 he graduated from the California Institute of Technology with a Master of Science in astrophysics. Chown studied under Richard Feynman at the California Institute of Technology.

His books on astronomy and physics are aimed primarily at the popular market, including Quantum Theory Cannot Hurt You, for which he was praised for "expressing opaque concepts with a unique clarity".

== Bibliography ==
=== Popular science ===
- Afterglow of Creation: From the Fireball to the Discovery of Cosmic Ripples (1993)
- The Magic Furnace: The Search for the Origins of Atoms (1999)
- The Universe Next Door: Twelve Mind-Blowing Ideas from the Cutting Edge of Science (2001) ISBN 978-0-7472-3528-6
- The Never-Ending Days of Being Dead: Dispatches from the Front Line of Science (2007)
- Quantum Theory Cannot Hurt You: A Guide to the Universe (2007) (published in U.S. as The Quantum Zoo: A Tourist's Guide to the Neverending Universe. (2005))
- We Need to Talk About Kelvin (2009) (published in the U.S. as The Matchbox That Ate A Forty-Ton Truck.)
- Solar System: A Visual Exploration of All the Planets, Moons and Other Heavenly Bodies that Orbit Our Sun (2011)
- Solar System for iPad (2010) (a book app)
- Tweeting the Universe: Tiny Explanations of Very Big Ideas (2011) (with Govert Schilling)
- What a Wonderful World: One Man's Attempt to Explain the Big Stuff (2013)
- The Ascent of Gravity: The Quest to Understand the Force that explains everything (2017)
- Big Bang (2018) (illus. Chris Moore)
- Infinity in the Palm of Your Hand: Fifty Wonders That Reveal an Extraordinary Universe (2018)
- The One Thing You Need to Know: The Simple Way to Understand the Most Important Ideas in Science (Feb 2023) ISBN 978-1-789-29480-4
- A Crack in Everything: How Black Holes Came in from the Cold and Took Cosmic Centre Stage (June 2024) ISBN 978-1-804-54432-7

=== Science Fiction ===
- Double Planet (with John Gribbin) (novel) Victor Gollancz (1988) ISBN 978-0-575-04357-2
- Reunion (with John Gribbin) (novel) Gollancz (1991) ISBN 978-0-575-04860-7
- Felicity Frobisher and the Three-Headed Aldebaran Dust Devil (2008)
