= In Search of Schrödinger's Cat =

Book by John Gribbin

- Author: John Gribbin
- Language: English
- Subject: Quantum theory
- Publisher: Bantam Books
- Publication date: 1984
- Publication place: United States
- Media type: Print (Hardcover and Paperback)
- Pages: 302 pp.
- ISBN: 978-0552125550

In Search of Schrödinger's Cat: Quantum Physics and Reality (1984) is a popular science book by the physicist John Gribbin. He discusses in layman's terms the history, applications and interpretations of quantum mechanics. Gribbin followed it with Schrödinger's Kittens and the Search for Reality (1995).

== Summary ==
Part I The Quantum
1. Light discusses Isaac Newton's corpuscular theory of light, which was superseded by Christiaan Huygens's wave theory. He introduces Thomas Young's double-slit experiment.
2. Atoms discusses the history of atomic theory, and how Albert Einstein's explanation of Brownian motion clinched the existence of atoms. He discusses J. J. Thomson's discovery of the electron and Ernest Rutherford's discovery of the atomic nucleus.
3 Light & Atoms discusses Max Planck's proposal that light is absorbed or emitted as quanta, and Einstein's application of quantum theory to explain the photoelectric effect, confirmed by Robert Millikan.
4. Bohr's Atom discusses Niels Bohr's application of quantum theory to the atom. Bohr's model, in which electrons jump to higher or lower energy states by absorbing or emitting photons of specific frequency, explained the Balmer series of spectral lines for hydrogen and the structure of the Periodic Table and correctly predicted the properties of hafnium.

Part II Quantum Mechanics
5. Photons & Electrons discusses photons, (coined by Gilbert N. Lewis to describe light quanta), whose existence was established by Arthur Compton's eponymous effect. Louis de Broglie proposed wave-particle duality, experimentally confirmed by Clinton Davisson and George Paget Thomson. He notes that "In 1906, J. J. Thomson received the Nobel Prize for proving that electrons are particles; in 1937 he saw his son awarded the Nobel Prize for proving that electrons are waves." Wolfgang Pauli's exclusion principle, that only two electrons can inhabit the same quantum state at the same time, explained the structure of atoms. He introduces spin and Bose-Einstein statistics (describing bosons, or particles with whole-integer spin) and Fermi-Dirac statistics (describing fermions, or particles with half-integer spin).
6. Matrices & Waves discusses Werner Heisenberg's matrix mechanics and Erwin Schrödinger's wave mechanics which, formulated independently, turned out to be mathematically equivalent.
7 Cooking With Quanta discusses applications of quantum mechanics. Paul Dirac's relativistic wave equation predicted the existence of antimatter, discovered by Carl David Anderson in 1932. Further applications include masers and lasers, semiconductors and superconductors. William and Lawrence Bragg's discovery of X-ray diffraction led to James Watson, Francis Crick and Rosalind Franklin's elucidation of the double helix structure of DNA.

Part III …And Beyond
8. Chance & Uncertainty discusses interpretations of quantum theory, Bohr's principle of complementarity and Heisenberg's uncertainty principle. He returns to the double-slit experiment.
9. Paradoxes and Possibilities discusses the Bohr-Einstein debates, the clock-in-the box thought experiment and the EPR paradox. He introduces Schrödinger's eponymous thought-experiment, Wigner's friend, Wheeler's delayed choice experiment and the participatory universe.
10. The Proof of the Pudding discusses John Stewart Bell's theorem and its test by Alain Aspect.
11. Many Worlds discusses Hugh Everett III's Many-Worlds Interpretation and its applications in science fact and fiction.

Epilogue Unfinished Business

Gribbin discusses quantum electrodynamics, electroweak theory and quantum chromodynamics. He looks at more speculative proposals, like Roger Penrose's Twistor theory.

== Reception and legacy ==
In Schrödinger's Kittens and the Search for Reality (1995), Gribbin tries to tie the loose ends together with string theory.

BBC World News cited In Search of Schrödinger's Cat as a model of science popularisation.

In Chemistry World, Josh Howego writes "Gribbin comments on how difficult it is to trace a narrative history through the piecemeal development of quantum theory, but he manages to craft his story excellently, nonetheless." He praises his use of analogy.

A review for an Oxford University blog concludes "I would still most definitely recommend this book for any aspiring physicist. Gribbin uses his excellent understanding of the essence of quantum mechanics to produce a book that is equal parts fascinating and educational."

Isaac Asimov called it "a gripping account of the history of quantum mechanics and a clear description of its significance - and weirdness. Absolutely fascinating."

Robert Macfarlane writes that "Margaret Atwood – who was one of the writers, along with Martin Amis, Ian McEwan, and Tom Stoppard, to get very excited about the new physics – read it, assimilated it, and credited Gribbin warmly in the back of her subsequent novel, Cat's Eye." A. S. Byatt called it "Precise yet mysterious … as beautiful as a poem and as exciting as a novel".

== See also ==
Biographical sources

- Graham Farmelo, The Strangest Man: The Hidden Life of Paul Dirac
- James Gleick, Genius: The Life and Science of Richard Feynman
- Abraham Pais, Subtle is the Lord: The Science and the Life of Albert Einstein

For layman's introductions to quantum theory

- Jim al-Khalili, Quantum: A Guide for the Perplexed
- Richard Feynman, QED: The Strange Theory of Light and Matter
- John Polkinghorne, The Quantum World
