= The Jupiter Effect =

1974 book by John Gribbin and Stephen Plagemann

- Cover of the first edition
- Authors: John Gribbin; Stephen Plagemann
- Language: English
- Subject: Astronomy
- Publication date: 1974
- Media type: Print (Hardcover and Paperback)
- Pages: 136
- ISBN: 978-0802704641

The Jupiter Effect is a 1974 book by John Gribbin and Stephen Plagemann, in which the authors predicted that an alignment of the planets of the Solar System would create a number of catastrophes, including a great earthquake on the San Andreas Fault, on March 10, 1982. The book became a best-seller. The predicted catastrophes did not occur.

== History ==
Astronomers had long been aware that there would be an alignment of the planets on that date, when Mercury, Venus, Earth, Mars, Jupiter, Saturn, Uranus, Neptune and Pluto would be on the same side of the Sun, within an arc 95 degrees wide. But no effect could be expected as the tidal forces of the other planets affecting the Earth's crust are negligible even at the planets' closest approach. In this book, the authors sought to partially sidestep these objections by considering the effect of the alignment on the Sun, and hence on the solar wind, which in turn is known to affect weather on the Earth. Atmospheric conditions on the Earth can alter the speed of its rotation. The effect on the Sun would also be quite small, however, and in fact there had been an even closer alignment in the year 1128 without any incident.

As a result of the book's popularity, the alignment received widespread media attention around the world when it occurred on March 10, 1982. While some took the predictions seriously, others marked the date with "end of the world"-themed parties. By the time the alignment happened, Gribbin had already disavowed the theory, telling the New York Times in February 1982 that his key prediction of increased solar activity had failed to materialize.

In April 1982, Gribbin and Plagemann published a lesser-selling book, The Jupiter Effect Reconsidered. In it they theorized that the effect had actually taken place in 1980, despite the lack of planetary alignment then, and that it had triggered the volcanic eruption of Mount St. Helens.

In his book, The Little Book of Science (pub. 1999), Gribbin admitted about his "Jupiter Effect" theory "...I don't like it, and I'm sorry I ever had anything to do with it."

== References to the Jupiter Effect ==
In his novel Goodbye California, (Fontana, 1980) Alistair Maclean makes a reference to the Jupiter Effect in the author's preface.

The novel Syzygy, by Frederik Pohl, published in 1981, uses the Jupiter Effect as a source of panic whipped up by religious fanatics, politicians and land speculators in Los Angeles around the time of the alignment. The narrative makes detailed references to the book's arguments and places them in the context of science, the politics of scientific funding, and social reactions.

A film version titled The Jupiter Menace was released in 1982, directed by Lee Auerbach and Peter Matulavich, and hosted by George Kennedy. The documentary features interviews with Stephen Plagemann, Jeffrey Goodman and John White (author of Pole Shift), It also includes Biblical prophecy, planetary alignments and survivalism. These topics are covered by interviews with CSA leader James Ellison, psychics Clarissa Bernhardt and Alex Tanous, and members of the Stelle community. The film's soundtrack was composed and produced by Larry Fast, under the name Synergy.

Jeff Johnson and Sandy Simpson released a song called "The Jupiter Effect" on their 1982 album, Through the Door.

In the 1984 film Blood Simple, the Jupiter Effect is mentioned on a car radio.
