= Wattzon =

WattzOn
- Type: Private
- Industry: Software
- Founded: Mountain View, California (2010)
- Founders: Martha Amram; Saul Griffith; Raffi Krikorian; Jim McBride; Steven Ashby
- Headquarters: Mountain View, California, U.S. San Francisco, California, U.S.
- Area served: Nationwide
- Key people: Martha Amram (CEO); Jon Enberg (VP Partnerships); Sandra Carrico (Sr. Data Scientist)
- Products: Consumer Energy Engagement Platform; Utility Data Connections (Nationwide)
- Number of employees: ~14 (August 2015)
- Website: http://www.wattzon.com/

WattzOn provides utility bill data to energy and credit markets. They offer three products. Link Energy transfers data from utilities to a consumer app. Link Prime transfers utility bill payment history to credit bureaus. Snap is a machine learning system optimized for data extraction from utility bills. WattzOn is a privately held SaaS ("Software as a Service") company that helps users in the U.S. learn how to save energy, in collaboration with cities and other business partners, through personalized plans, products and rebate information, and tips for habit changes. WattzOn provides nationwide capture of residential utility data, and they claim that a typical user saves nearly $240 per year in energy, and that their water programs save an average of 9,000 gallons per year.

WattzOn’s partners use its software platform to acquire customer utility data, and increase customer uptake of products and services, including solar.

WattzOn was founded in 2007 and has offices in Mountain View and San Francisco, CA, where it is part of OtherLab, a group of companies co-founded by Saul Griffith.

== History ==
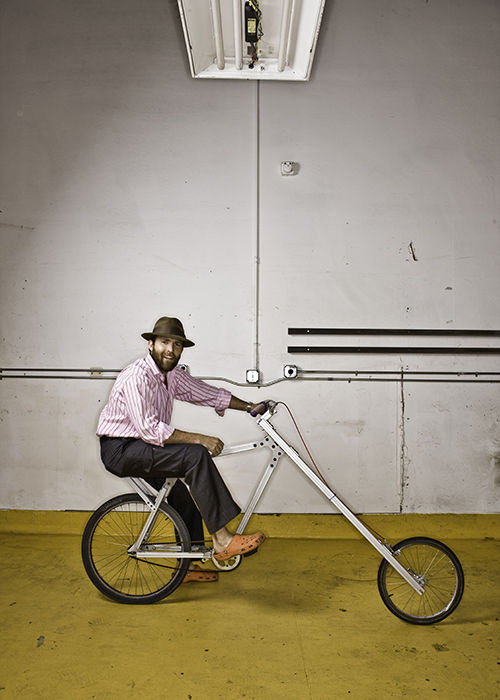
Saul Griffith in 2008

WattzOn was started as a free web-based online tool by Saul Griffith, Raffi Krikorian, and Jim McBride. The original offering allowed users to calculate their total energy footprint by estimating their direct and indirect power consumption with the stated goal of educating users about energy efficiency and conservation. Unlike most carbon calculators, WattzOn has always measured energy consumption, and not the by-products (CO_{2}, or CO_{2}-equivalent emissions).

The original idea behind WattzOn was first spoken about by Saul Griffith and Jim McBride in a presentation entitled "The Game Plan: A solution framework for the climate challenge," delivered at O'Reilly's Foo Camp and later detailed at length in Griffith's Long Now talk entitled Climate Change Recalculated. From there, Raffi Krikorian spearheaded the effort to create an online tool that anybody could use to measure his or her level of energy efficiency. That website became WattzOn.com.

In 2011 WattzOn combined with EnnovationZ Inc, a company founded by Martha Amram and Steven Ashby. Since then Martha has led WattzOn.

WattzOn was the recipient of a grant from the Department of Energy to bring consumers insights from smart meters. In partnership with Balfour Beatty, WattzOn served military families, and helped them save an average of 18% on their utility bill at 12 locations.

== Presentation at The White House ==
In 2012, WattzOn CEO Dr. Martha Amram presented at the White House Energy Data Palooza. In 2013 Dr. Amram presented at a Green Button event organized by the White House and the Department of Energy.

== WattzOn in The Media ==
WattzOn has garnered media coverage from a number of blogs and media outlets such as Business Week, Wired magazine, and Lifehacker.com.

== Business Model ==
WattzOn uses a SaaS license model.
