= Schrödinger's paradox =

Schrödinger's paradox may refer to two ideas by Erwin Schrödinger:

- Schrödinger's cat, a thought experiment concerning quantum superposition
- Schrödinger's paradox, the paradox that living systems increase their organization despite the second law of thermodynamics, as seen in entropy and life
