= Vicente Guallart =

Spanish architect (born 1963)

Practice information
- Founded: Institute for Advanced Architecture of Catalonia
- Location: Barcelona

Significant works and honors
- Awards: 2014. Barcelona was selected as the European Capital of Innovation when he was chief architect of Barcelona City Council.; 2014. Named as chief scientist for the China National Smart City Joint Lab by the Ministry of Housing and Urban-Rural Development; 2013. Named as a member of the scientific committee of the Slow City association; 2002. Ciutat de Barcelona prize in the multimedia category for the Media House Project; 1998. Möbius Award. Best Scientific CD-ROM in Spain: “Gaudí”; 1996. Cannes Milia d’Or. Special Mention in Design CD-ROM “Mateo at ETH”; 1995. Möbius Award. Best Spanish CD-ROM “Mateo at ETH”; 1992. FAD Award in Interior Design

Website
- www.guallart.com

Vicente Guallart (Valencia, 1963) is a Spanish architect, urban planner, and researcher. He is one of the worldwide experts in Ecological Urban Development and Digital Cities with high expertise in Strategic Planning, Master Plan Development, Transport Oriented Development, Project Management, and Building and Landscape Design.

Vicente Guallart is former chief architect of Barcelona City Council 2011-2015 with the responsibility of developing the strategic vision of the transformation of the city and its major development projects. He was the first general manager of Urban Habitat, a new department created in Barcelona City Council to encompass the areas of urban planning, housing, environment, infrastructures and information technologies.

Previously he founded the Institute for Advanced Architecture of Catalonia (IAAC), one of the best Architectural Master Schools in the world, where he led projects such as Media House Project (with MIT's CBA), Hyper Catalunya, or the Fab Lab House. He is currently director at Valldaura Labs of IAAC and co-director of Master for Advanced Ecological Buildings and Biocities (MAEEB).

His professional office, Guallart Architects, has developed ecological projects such as the ports of Fugee and Keelung in Taiwan, the Sociopolis neighborhood in Valencia or Gandia Sharing Blocks. He has won several projects in China like post-Covid housing in China in Xiang'an (2020), a project that won competing with 300 architectural studios around the world, or Xiangmihu Master Plan in Shenzhen (2018). He is the author of books like Geologics or The Self-Sufficient City and co-author of the Metapolis Dictionary of Advanced Architecture. He is editor of the English edition for the General Theory of Urbanization by Ildefons Cerdà.

His work has been exhibited at the Venice Biennale, MoMA or AIA in Washington. He has published “The self-sufficient city” a book that outlines a blueprint for the world to come, a world built around cities and their renewed capabilities to become productive again, based on the principles of local self-sufficiency and global connectivity.

== Early life and career ==
Graduated as an architect in 1989 in Valencia, he moved to Barcelona and joined José Luis Mateo-Map Arquitectos, with whom he took part in architecture competitions such as the Paris Zoo and the Lustgarten in Berlin. He opened his own office in Barcelona in 1992. It has stood out for its ecological approaches and self-sufficiency, in which nature and technologies coexist.

Trained at the architectural universities of Valencia and Barcelona, he opened an office in Barcelona in 1992. It has stood out for its ecological approaches and self-sufficiency, in which nature and technologies coexist.

== Barcelona City Council ==
He was chief architect of Barcelona City Council (2011-2015) with the responsibility of developing the strategic vision for the city and its major development projects. He developed the idea of the new department ‘Urban Habitat’ in order to integrate all the different layers of the urban development into a unified department (urbanism, infrastructures, transportation, energy, water, housing and environment). During his term, the city invested more than one billion euros in urban projects and city transformation. Also during his term, important projects such as the Plaza de las Glorias were developed, the gaze turned towards Collserola and the mountain neighborhoods, and the Digital City Campus was promoted in 22@ on the Diagonal. During those years, Barcelona was chosen by the European Union as the "most connected city in the world" (Fortune Magazine, 2015) and Global Smart City 2015 (Juniper Magazine).

== Institute of Advanced Architecture of Catalonia (IAAC) ==
He also co-founded and directed the Institute of Advanced Architecture of Catalonia (2001-2011) where he led projects such as Media House Project (with MIT's CBA), HyperCatalunya, and the Fab Lab House. IAAC now organized the Master’s program in Advanced Architecture with more than 150 students from more than 40 countries.

== Guallart Architects ==
His professional office since 1992, Guallart Architects, has developed widely published projects such as the ports of Fugee and Keelung in Taiwan, and the Sociopolis neighbourhood in Valencia, and is now working on projects of different scales around the world. He has won several competitions in Shenzhen (2018) related to new Urban districts and TOD (Transit Oriented Development). The last key competition he has won is the post-Covid housing in China in Xiang'an (2020), a project that won competing with 300 architectural studios around the world. or Xiangmihu Master Plan in Shenzhen (2018).

== Architectural theory and exhibitions ==
He is the author of books including Geologics and The Self-Sufficient City and is co-author of the Metapolis Dictionary of Advanced Architecture. His work has been exhibited at the Venice Biennale and the New York MoMA, and the American Institute of Architects organized in 2010 a solo exhibition of his work in Washington DC.

Vicente Guallart was the editor of the first ever translation into English of the General Theory of Urbanization, written by Ildefons Cerdà in 1867, the first worldwide theory about making cities, where the word ‘urbanism’ was coined.

He was the founder of the Shukhov Lab at the Higher School of Economics in Moscow, where he developed the Master’s in Prototyping Future Cities.

He has given lectures in many universities around the world including Princeton, Harvard, MIT, Columbia, AA (School of Architecture, London) and MArchI (Moscow Architectural Institute).

== One-man exhibitions ==
- Urban Ecologies. Cervantes Cultural Institute. Beijing. China. 2018.
- Geologics, American Institute of Architects, Washington. USA.2010
- Natural Logics. IVAM. Valencia. 2007
- Media. Mountains and Architecture, Galia Ras. Barcelona. 2004
- La Beauté de la Nature, Avignon. 2000
- The House of the Digital Man, Fundación COAM. 1998

== Collective exhibitions ==
- Una ciudad llamada España, Athens, Greece. 2010.
- Venice XI Biennal, Out There: Architecture Beyond Building with: Hyperhabitat: Reprogramming the World. Venezia, Italia. 2008.
- Bienal Internacional de Arte Contemporáneo de Sevilla. Sevilla. 2008.
- ArchiLAB, Orleáns. 2008.
- Biennal Internacional de Arquitectura de São Paulo. 2007.
- Construccions Patents. New Architecture made in Catalonia. Deutsches Architekturmuseum. Frankfurt. 2007.
- Exposition Génération. Europan. París, France. 2007.
- MoMA. “On Site. New Architecture in Spain”. New York, USA. 2006.
- Sociópolis. Architektur Zentrum. Wien. 2004.
- Sociópolis, Bienal de Valencia, Spain. 2003.
- Hipercatalunya, MACBA, Barcelona. 2003.
- Invited to the official selection of the Biennale de Venezia 2000 with Barcelona Metapolis.
- Invited to the official selection of the Biennale de Venezia 2000 for Ecity.
- Archilab. 2001.
- Archilab. 2000.
- Exhibition HLM, Ministerio de Fomento. 2001.
- Against Architecture, EACC. 2000.
- Urban Natures, EACC. 2001.
- Barcelona Metapolis. 1998.
- 36 modèles pour une maison, Bordeaux, France. 1998.
- Fabrications, MACBA, MoMA, SFMOMA, WEXNER. 1998.
- EUROPAN II.

== Books ==
- Plans and Projects for Barcelona 2011-2015. (w/ Carles Bárcena and Ricard Gratacòs)
- General Theory of Urbanization 1867. Ildefons Cerdà.
- Geologics. Geography, Information and Architecture. Ed. ACTAR 2009.
- Re-Naturalisation. Published by AADCU Program + HUST press, 2008.
- Lógica Natural. Published by IVAM, 2008.
- Sociópolis. Project for a City of the Future.Published by ACTAR, Architektur Zentrum Wien, 2005.
- The Metapolis Dictionary of Advanced Architecture. Edited by Vicente Guallart, Willy Müller, Manuel Gausa, Federico Soriano, José Morales, Fernando Porras. Published by ACTAR, 2002.
- Met 1.0. Edited by Vicente Guallart, Willy Müller, Manuel Gausa. Published by ACTAR, 1998.
- Self-Fab House. Edited by Vicente Guallart, Lucas Capelli. Published by ACTAR, Institut d’Arquitectura Avançada de Catalunya, 2010.
- Self-Sufficient Housing. Edited by Vicente Guallart. Contributors: Vicente Guallart, Willy Müller, Lucas Capelli. Published by ACTAR, Institut d’Arquitectura Avançada de Catalunya, 2006.
- Self-Sufficient City. Ed. ACTAR, 2014..
- hiCat. Research Territories. Essays by Vicente Guallart and Willy Müller, Manuel Gausa. Published by ACTAR, 2005.
- geoCat. Territorial Loops. Edited by Vicente Guallart, Laura Cantarella. Published by ACTAR, 2005.

== Architecture ==
- Hortal Mediterraneo House. Tarragona, Spain.
- Valldaura Labs Design and Rehabilitation. Barcelona, Spain.
- Gandia University Housing. Gandia, Spain.
- Sociopolis Sharing Tower. Valencia, Spain.
- Apartments in Cambrils. Spain.
- Kim Hyng Yoon, Editing Co. Seoul, South Korea.
- Fugee Port Market. Taiwan.
- Fin-People Exchange Center Xiangmihu. Shenzhen, China.

== Landscape design ==
- Sociopolis Urbanisation. Valencia, Spain.
- Vinaròs Promenade and Microcoasts. Vinaròs, Spain.
- Taiwan Keelung Port, Taiwan.
- Public Space Design Xiangmihu. Shenzhen, China.
- Rooftop Park Shenzhen-Hong Kong Science Park. Shenzhen, China.

== Masterplanning ==
- Shenzhen Bay Super Headquarters Base. Shenzhen, China.
- Shenzhen Xiangmihu Central Business District. Shenzhen, China.
- Global Design for the Suqian Grand Canal Area. Suquian, China.
- The Forest City Project - The Future Urban Bio-City, Gabon.

== Awards and honors ==
- 2014. Barcelona was selected as the European Capital of Innovation when he was chief architect of Barcelona City Council.
- 2014. Named as chief scientist for the China National Smart City Joint Lab by the Ministry of Housing and Urban-Rural Development
- 2013. Named as a member of the scientific committee of the Slow City association
- 2002. Ciutat de Barcelona prize in the multimedia category for the Media House Project
- 1998. Möbius Award. Best Scientific CD-ROM in Spain: “Gaudí”
- 1996. Cannes Milia d’Or. Special Mention in Design CD-ROM “Mateo at ETH”
- 1995. Möbius Award. Best Spanish CD-ROM “Mateo at ETH”
- 1992. FAD Award in Interior Design
