= Makani (company) =

California-based company

Makani Technologies LLC
- Type: Subsidiary
- Industry: Wind power
- Founded: 2006
- Defunct: 19 February 2020
- Key people: Saul Griffith, Corwin Hardham, Donald Montague, Damon Vander Lind
- Number of employees: 20+
- Parent: Alphabet Inc.
- Website: makanipower.com

Makani Technologies LLC was an Alameda, California-based company that developed airborne wind turbines. Founded in 2006, Makani was acquired by Google in May 2013. In February 2020, Makani was shut down by Alphabet, Google's parent company.

== History ==
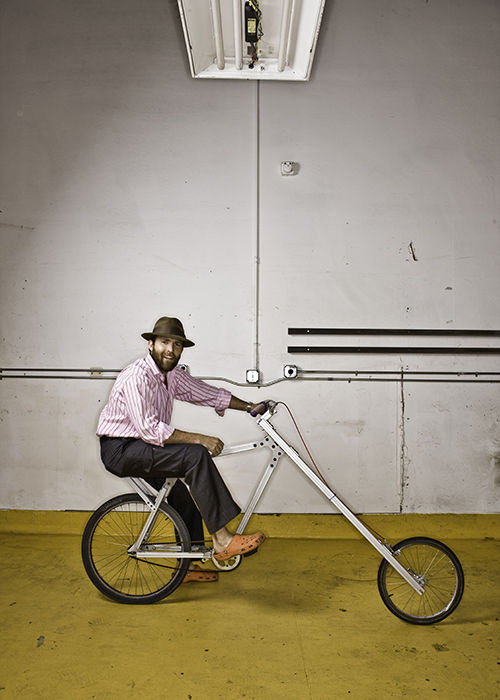
Saul Griffith in 2008

Makani was founded in 2006 by Saul Griffith, Don Montague, and Corwin Hardham. It received funding as part of Google.org's Renewable Energy cheaper than Coal (RE<C) initiative. "Makani" is Hawaiian for "wind." Corwin Hardham died in 2012 at age 38. On 23 May 2013, Makani Power was acquired by Google and was folded into Google X. In 2015, Fort Felker, former director of the National Wind Technology Center at the National Renewable Energy Laboratory (NREL) was hired as CEO.

In December 2016, Makani operated for the first time a 600 kW prototype with 28 meter wing span.

Starting August 2018, Makani operated an energy kite test site on the Big Island of Hawaii.

In February 2019, Makani was separated from X and made into a subsidiary of Alphabet. At the same time, Royal Dutch Shell made a minority investment in Makani and began a partnership with the company to develop its business.

In 2019 the offshore energy kite was lost during testing. Investigation and reporting on the technical details of the mishap was undertaken. The wing did not successfully land on the platform resulting in the loss of the energy kite.

In February 2020, Alphabet shut down Makani. The company said "Despite strong technical progress, the road to commercialization is longer and riskier than hoped." In September 2020, Makani released the Energy Kite Collection — a three-part report and accompanying collection of open source code repositories, flight logs and technical videos from the project. It also released Pulling Power from the Sky: The Story of Makani, a documentary on the project, and made a non-assertion pledge on its patent portfolio, allowing anyone to use its patents without fear of legal reprisal.

== Technology ==
In order to meet its goal of producing low-cost renewable energy, the Makani kite-energy system used autonomous tethered wings which flew in a circular path and generated electricity via wind turbines mounted upon the main wing, a method known as crosswind kite power, originally envisioned by Miles Loyd in a 1980 paper. Loyd stated that for large scale purposes flying the generators was expected to be disfavored because of the need to fly the mass of the generators; many of Makani Power competitors have generators kept on the ground, like KiteGen, Italy. The electricity is generated on the ground in the tether, utilising tension in the cable connected to the kite.

== See also ==
- List of airborne wind energy organizations
