= John Gribbin =

British science writer and astrophysicist (born 1946)

John Gribbin FRSL
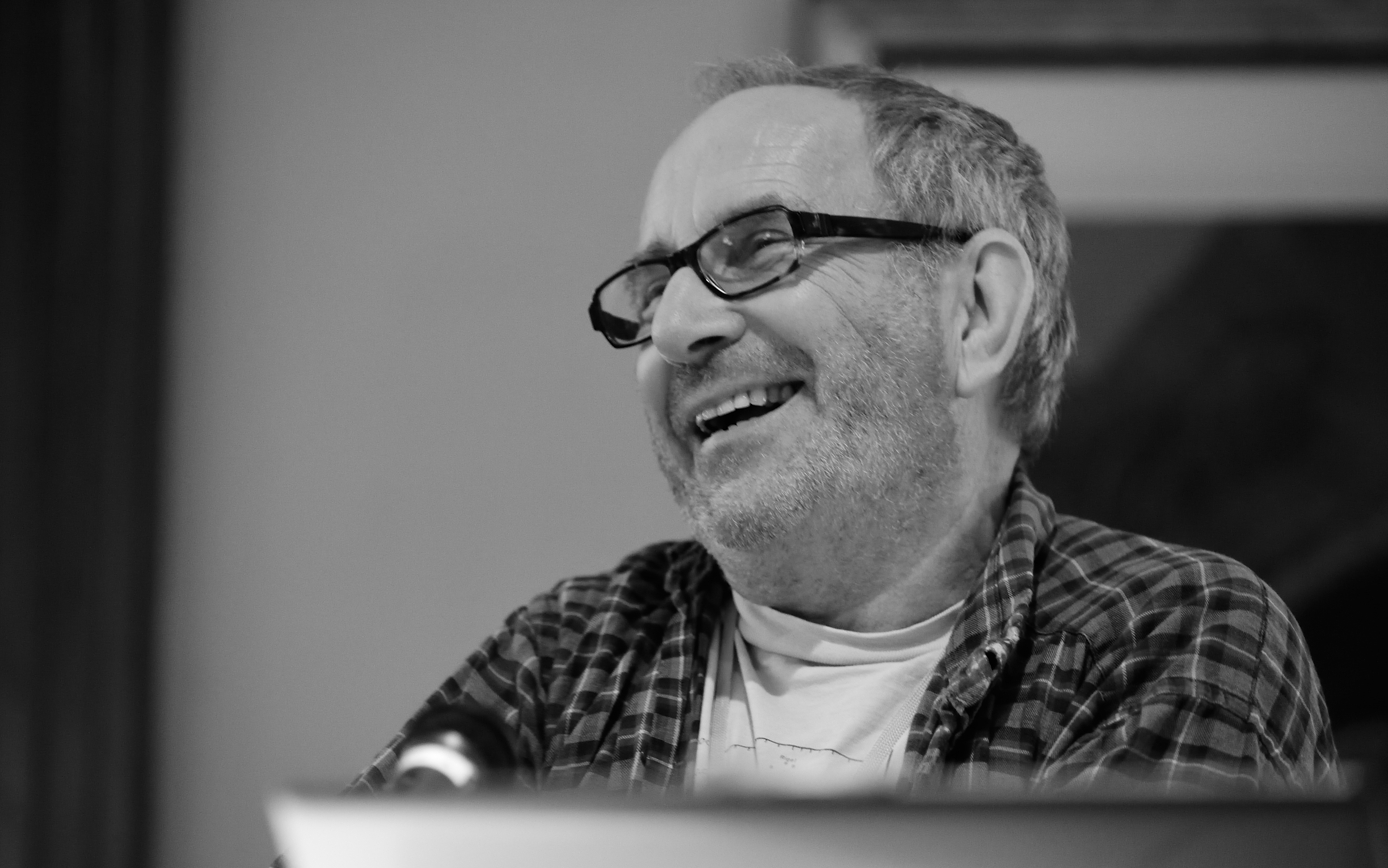
- Gribbin at Novacon in 2014
- Born: John R. Gribbinth; 19 March 1946 (age 80); Maidstone, Kent, England
- Education: University of Sussex (BA, MSc); University of Cambridge (PhD)
- Occupations: Science writer and journalist
- Spouse: Mary Gribbin
- Writing career
- Period: Last quarter of the 20th century, beginning of the 21st century
- Genres: Science (origins of the universe, astronomy, cosmology); biography; fiction
- Subjects: Astronomy and astrophysics; popularising science and its history; climate change and global warming

John R. Gribbin (born 19 March 1946) is a British science writer and astrophysicist. His subjects include quantum physics, human evolution, climate change and cosmology. He is a visiting fellow in astronomy at the University of Sussex. Best known for In Search of Schrödinger's Cat, he has also written biographies of Charles Darwin, Albert Einstein and Buddy Holly. Robert Macfarlane calls him "one of the finest and most prolific writers of popular science around."

== Biography ==
John Gribbin graduated with his bachelor's degree in physics from the University of Sussex in 1966. He then earned his Master of Science (MSc) degree in astronomy in 1967, also from the University of Sussex, and he earned his PhD in astrophysics from the University of Cambridge (1971).

In 1968, Gribbin worked as one of Fred Hoyle's research students at the Institute of Theoretical Astronomy, and wrote a number of stories for New Scientist about the institute's research and what were eventually discovered to be pulsars.

In 1974, Gribbin and Stephen Plagemann published The Jupiter Effect, which predicted that the alignment of the planets in a quadrant on one side of the Sun on 10 March 1982 would cause gravitational effects that would trigger earthquakes in the San Andreas Fault, possibly wiping out Los Angeles and its suburbs. Gribbin distanced himself from The Jupiter Effect in the 17 July 1980, issue of New Scientist magazine, stating that he had been "too clever by half".

In February 1982, he and Plagemann published The Jupiter Effect Reconsidered, claiming that the 1980 Mount St. Helens eruption proved their theory true despite a lack of planetary alignment. In 1999, Gribbin repudiated it, saying "I don't like it, and I'm sorry I ever had anything to do with it."

In 1984, Gribbin published In Search of Schrödinger's Cat. Robert Macfarlane writes that it "was among the best of the first wave of physics popularisations to share in the success of Stephen Hawking's multi-million-selling A Brief History of Time. Margaret Atwood – who was one of the writers, along with Martin Amis, Ian McEwan, and Tom Stoppard, to get very excited about the new physics – read it, assimilated it, and credited Gribbin warmly in the back of her subsequent novel, Cat’s Eye.”

Gribbin's book was cited by BBC World News as an example of how to revive an interest in the study of mathematics.

Gribbin was elected a Fellow of the Royal Society of Literature in 1999.

He has been a guest on In Our Time, discussing "Science in the 20th Century" with Mary Midgley.

In 2006, Gribbin took part in a BBC radio 4 broadcast as an "expert witness". Presenter Matthew Parris discussed with Professor Kathy Sykes and Gribbin whether Albert Einstein "really was a 'crazy genius'".

At the 2009 World Conference of Science Journalists, the Association of British Science Writers presented Gribbin with their Lifetime Achievement award.

== Critical reception ==
The Spectator praised Science: A History as "the product of immense learning, and a lifetime spent working out how to write in a vivacious way about science and scientists".

Henry Gee, a senior editor at Nature, described Gribbin as "one of the best science writers around".

A review of The Universe: A Biography in the journal Physics World praised his skill in explaining difficult ideas.

A Wall Street Journal review of Flower Hunters (co-authored with Mary Gribbin) described the writing as "pedestrian", with plenty of domestic detail but a failure to convey a larger cultural context. It stated that the book's chapter-length biographical sketches are too often superficial, and criticised the book for glaring omissions of prominent plant collectors.

In a review of The Reason Why, the Times Higher Education states that Gribbin writes on speculative matters and presents some of his theories without supporting evidence, but noted his comprehensive research and lyrical writing.

== Selected bibliography ==
=== Astronomy ===
- (1976) Astronomy for the Amateur, Macmillan, ISBN 978-0-333-18806-4
- (1976) Our Changing Universe: The New Astronomy, Dutton, ISBN 978-0-87690-216-5
- (1977) White Holes: Cosmic Gushers in the Universe, Delacorte Press/E. Friede, ISBN 978-0-440-09529-3
- (1980) The Death of the Sun, Dell Publishing ISBN 978-0-440-51854-9 (also as The Strangest Star: The Scientific Account of the Life and Death of the Sun, 1980, Athlone Press, ISBN 978-0-485-11207-8)
- (1991) Blinded by the Light: The Secret Life of the Sun, Bantam, ISBN 978-0-593-02064-7
- (1996) Companion to the Cosmos (with Mary Gribbin), Little: ISBN 0-316-32835-9
- (1998) The Case of the Missing Neutrinos: And Other Phenomena of the Universe, Fromm Intl. ISBN 978-0-88064-199-9
- (1998) Watching the Universe, Constable, ISBN 978-0-09-478230-3
- (2001) Stardust: Supernovae and Life: The Cosmic Connection (with Mary Gribbin) ISBN 978-0-30-009097-0
- (2008) Galaxies: A Very Short Introduction, Oxford University Press, USA. ISBN 978-0-19-923434-9
- (2008) From Here to Infinity: The Royal Observatory Greenwich Guide to Astronomy (with Mary Gribbin), National Maritime Museum, ISBN 978-0-948065-78-1; republished in 2009 as From Here to Infinity: A Beginner's Guide to Astronomy, Sterling ISBN 978-1-4027-6501-8
- (2011) Alone in the Universe: Why Our Planet Is Unique, John Wiley & Sons, ISBN 978-1-118-14797-9
- (2018) "Alone in the Milky Way: Why we are probably the only intelligent life in the galaxy", Scientific American, vol. 319, no. 3 (September 2018), pp. 94–99.

=== Biology ===
- (1985) In Search of the Double Helix, McGraw-Hill, ISBN 978-0-07-024740-6
- (1985) The Redundant Male: Is Sex Irrelevant in the Modern World? (with Jeremy Cherfas) Paladin, ISBN 978-0-586-08503-5
- (1988) The One Percent Advantage: The Sociobiology of Being Human, Blackwell Publishers, ISBN 978-0-631-16004-5
- (1990) Children of the Ice: Climate and Human Origins, Blackwell Publishers (with Mary Gribbin) ISBN 978-0-631-16817-1
- (1993) Being Human: Putting People in an Evolutionary Perspective, J.M .Dent & Sons (with Mary Gribbin) ISBN 978-0-460-86164-9
- (2003) The Mating Game (revised edition of The Redundant Male), Barnes and Noble, ISBN 978-0-7607-4543-4
- (2003) The First Chimpanzee: In Search of Human Origins (with Cherfas), Barnes and Noble, ISBN 978-0-7607-4542-7

=== Children's books on science ===
- (1997) Time and the Universe (What's the Big Idea?) (with Mary Gribbin) Hodder & Stoughton, ISBN 978-0-340-65590-0
- (2003) Big Numbers: A Mind Expanding Trip to Infinity and Back (with Mary Gribbin), Wizard Books (children's imprint of Icon Books) 2005 edition ISBN 1-84046-661-8
- (2003) The Science of Philip Pullman’s His Dark Materials (with Mary Gribbin) Introduction by Philip Pullman. ISBN 978-0-375-83144-7
- (2008) Time Travel for Beginners (with Mary Gribbin), Hodder Children's, ISBN 978-0-340-95702-8

=== Cosmology ===
- (1986) In Search of the Big Bang, Bantam, ISBN 0-553-34617-2
- (1988) The Omega Point: The Search for the Missing Mass and the Ultimate Fate of the Universe, Bantam, ISBN 978-0-553-34515-5
- (1989) Cosmic Coincidences: Dark Matter, Mankind, and Anthropic Cosmology (with Martin Rees) Bantam, ISBN 0-553-34740-3
- (1994) In the Beginning: After COBE and Before the Big Bang, Bulfinch Press, ISBN 978-0-316-32833-3
- (1997) Origins: Our Place in Hubble's Universe, Constable and Robinson ISBN 978-0-09-477550-3 (as Empire of the Sun, '98; as Cosmos '06)
- (2001) The Birth of Time: How Astronomers Measured the Age of the Universe, Yale University Press, ISBN 0-300-08914-7 (2009 edition ISBN 978-0-300-08914-1)
- (2001) Hyperspace: The Universe and Its Mysteries (also pub as Space: Our Final Frontier), DK ADULT, ISBN 978-0-7894-7838-2
- (2007) The Universe: A Biography, Allen Lane, ISBN 0-7139-9857-1
- (2015) 13.8: The Quest to Find the True Age of the Universe and the Theory of Everything, Icon Books, ISBN 978-1-84831-918-9

=== Environmental science ===
- (1975) Our Changing Climate, Faber & Faber, ISBN 978-0-571-10696-7
- (1976) Forecasts, Famines, and Freezes: Climates and Man's Future, Wildwood House Ltd, ISBN 978-0-7045-0193-5
- (1977) Our Changing Planet, Wildwood House Limited ISBN 0-690-01693-X
- (1978) Climatic Change, Cambridge University Press ISBN 978-0-521-21594-7
- (1978) The climatic threat: What's wrong with our weather?, Fontana ISBN 978-0-00-634832-0
- (1979) Climate and Mankind, Earthscan, 56 pp ISBN 978-0-905347-12-7
- (1979) This Shaking Earth (aka Earthquakes & Volcanoes) Sidgwick & Jackson, ISBN 978-0-283-98462-4
- (1979) Weather Force: Climate and Its Impact on Our World (with John Man), Putnam Pub Group, ISBN 978-0-399-12400-6
- (1981) Carbon Dioxide, Climate, and Man, Intl Inst for Environment, 64 pp. ISBN 978-0-905347-28-8
- (1982) Future Weather and the Greenhouse Effect, Delacorte Press, ISBN 978-0-440-02498-9
- (1985) Weather, Macdonald Education, 48 pp. ISBN 978-0-356-11183-4
- (1986) The Breathing Planet (editor) Blackwell Publishers, ISBN 978-0-631-14288-1
- (1988) The Hole in the Sky: Man's Threat to the Ozone Layer (rev. ed, 1993) Bantam, ISBN 978-0-553-27537-7
- (1989) Winds of Change, Hodder Arnold, ISBN 978-0-340-52283-7
- (1990) Hothouse Earth: The Greenhouse Effect and Gaia, Random House, ISBN 978-0-517-07951-5
- (1992) Too Hot to Handle? Greenhouse Effect, Corgi, ISBN 978-0-552-54295-1
- (1996) Watching the Weather, Trafalgar Square, ISBN 978-0-09-477380-6

=== General Science ===
- (1994) Eyewitness Science: Time and Space, Dorling Kindersley, ISBN 0-7894-5578-1
- (1999) Almost Everyone's Guide to Science: The Universe, Life, and Everything, Yale University Press, ISBN 0-300-08460-9
- (1999) Get a Grip on New Physics, Weidenfeld & Nicolson, London. ISBN 0-297-82703-0
- (1999) The Little Book of Science, Barnes and Noble, ISBN 978-0-7607-1687-8
- (2004) Deep Simplicity: Bringing Order To Chaos And Complexity, Random House, 2004, ISBN 978-1-4000-6256-0
- (2020) Seven Pillars of Science, Icon Books Ltd, ISBN 978-178578-858-1

=== History of Science ===
- (2003) Science: A History 1543–2001, Gardners Books, ISBN 0-14-029741-3 (published in the US as The Scientists: A History of Science Told Through the Lives of Its Greatest Inventors), Random House, ISBN 0-8129-6788-7
- (2005) Annus Mirabilis: 1905, Albert Einstein, and the Theory of Relativity (with Mary Gribbin), Chamberlain Bros. ISBN 1-59609-144-4 (includes DVD)
- (2006) The Fellowship: The Story of a Revolution, Allen Lane, ISBN 0-7139-9745-1 (the story of the Royal Society)
- (2006) History of Western Science, 1543-2001, Folio Society, London [2nd edition of Science: A History, 1543-2001, with minor amendments and a new preface by the author].
- (2009) Flower Hunters, Oxford University Press, (with Mary Gribbin) ISBN 978-0-19-956182-7
- (2016) Einstein's Masterwork: 1915 and the General Theory of Relativity, Pegasus Books ISBN 978-1-681-77212-7
- (2017) Out of the Shadow of a Giant: Hooke, Halley and the Birth of British Science. London: William Collins. 2017. ISBN 978-0-00-822059-4. OCLC 966239842. (with Mary Gribbin)
- (2022) On The Origin of Evolution: Tracing 'Darwin's Dangerous Idea' from Aristotle to DNA (with Mary Gribbin) ISBN 978-1-63-388705-3

=== Quantum physics ===
- (1984) In Search of Schrödinger's Cat: Quantum Physics and Reality, Bantam Books, ISBN 0-553-34253-3 (reprinted in 2012 by Random House ISBN 978-1-4464-2376-9)
- (1995) Schrödinger's Kittens and the Search for Reality, Back Bay Books, ISBN 0-316-32819-7
- (1998) Q Is for Quantum: An Encyclopedia of Particle Physics, Free Press, ISBN 0-684-85578-X
- (2002) Quantum Physics (Essential Science), Dorling Kindersley, ISBN 978-0-7513-3976-5
- (2007) (in French) La physique quantique, Pearson Education, ISBN 978-2-7440-7263-5
- (2014) Computing with Quantum Cats: From Colossus to Qubits, Prometheus Books, ISBN 978-1-6161-4921-5
- (2019) Six Impossible Things: The 'Quanta of Solace' and the Mysteries of the Subatomic World, Icon Books, ISBN 978-1785784996

=== Relativity ===
- (1979) Timewarps, Delacorte Press/E. Friede, ISBN 978-0-440-08509-6
- (1983) Spacewarps: Black Holes, White Holes, Quasars, and the Universe, Delta, ISBN 978-0-14-022531-0
- (1992) In Search of the Edge of Time: Black Holes, White Holes, Worm Holes, Bantam Books, ISBN 978-0-593-02409-6 (US title Unveiling the Edge of Time, Three Rivers Press. 1994 reprint: ISBN 0-517-88170-5)

=== Science Fiction ===
- (1980) The Sixth Winter (with Douglas Orgill) Simon & Schuster ISBN 978-0-671-25016-4
- (1982) Brother Esau (with Douglas Orgill) Harper & Row ISBN 978-0-06-039016-7
- (1988) Double Planet (with Marcus Chown) Victor Gollancz ISBN 978-0-575-04357-2
- (1990) Father to the Man Tor Books ISBN 978-0-8125-3850-2
- (1991) Ragnarok (with D.G. Compton) Gollancz ISBN 978-0-575-05110-2
- (1991) Reunion (with Marcus Chown) Gollancz ISBN 978-0-575-04860-7
- (1993) Innervisions Penguin Books ISBN 978-0-14-017447-2
- (2009) Timeswitch PS Publishing ISBN 978-1-906301-61-3
- (2011) The Alice Encounter PS Publishing ISBN 978-1-84863-138-0

=== String theory ===
- (1998) The Search for Superstrings, Symmetry, and the Theory of Everything, Little, Brown and Company, ISBN 978-0-316-32975-0
- (2010) In Search of the Multiverse: Parallel Worlds, Hidden Dimensions, and the Ultimate Quest for the Frontiers of Reality, Wiley, ISBN 0-4706-1352-1

=== Biography ===
- (1992) Stephen Hawking: A Life in Science (with Michael White), National Academies Press ISBN 0-452-26988-1, 2002 edition: ISBN 0-309-08410-5
- (1993) Einstein : A Life in Science (with Michael White), Simon & Schuster ISBN 0-671-01044-1
- (1995) Darwin: A Life in Science (with Michael White), Dutton Adult ISBN 978-0-525-94002-9
- (1997) Darwin in 90 Minutes (with Mary Gribbin), Constable and Robinson ISBN 978-0-09-477050-8 (Part of a series including: Curie ISBN 978-0-09-477020-1, Einstein ISBN 978-0-09-477130-7, Faraday ISBN 978-0-09-477100-0, Galileo ISBN 978-0-09-477110-9, Halley ISBN 978-0-09-477030-0, Mendel ISBN 978-0-09-477120-8, Newton ISBN 978-0-09-477040-9)
- (1997) Richard Feynman: A Life in Science (with Mary Gribbin), Penguin Books ISBN 0-14-025334-3
- (2003) FitzRoy: The Remarkable Story of Darwin's Captain and the Invention of the Weather Forecast (with Mary Gribbin), Yale University Press ISBN 0-300-10361-1
- (2009) He Knew He Was Right: The Irrepressible Life of James Lovelock and Gaia (with Mary Gribbin), Allen Lane. ISBN 978-1-84614-016-7
- (2009) Not Fade Away: The Life and Music of Buddy Holly (with Mary Gribbin) Icon, ISBN 9781848313835
- (2013) Erwin Schrödinger and the Quantum Revolution, Wiley, ISBN 1-1182-9926-4
