= Neil Gershenfeld =

American computer scientist

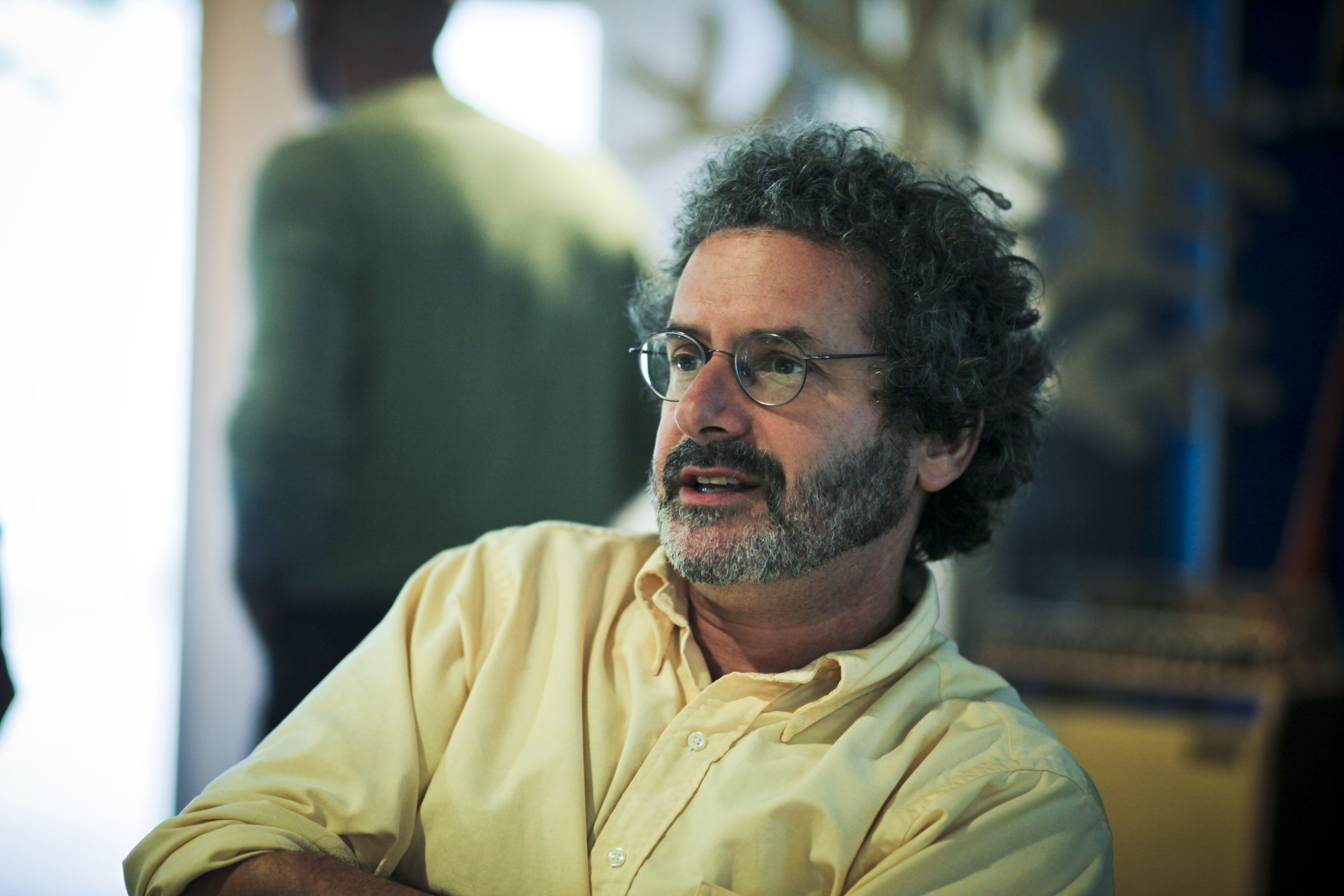
- Gershenfeld in 2010
- Born: Neil Adam Gershenfeld; December 1, 1959 (age 66); Ardmore, Pennsylvania, U.S.
- Education: Swarthmore College (BA); Cornell University (PhD)
- Known for: Director of MIT's Center for Bits and Atoms
- Scientific career
- Fields: Computer sciences
- Workplaces: Massachusetts Institute of Technology
- Thesis: Representation of chaos (1990)
- Doctoral advisor: Watt W. Webb
- Notable students: Edward Boyden; Aram Harrow
- Website: ng.cba.mit.edu

Neil Adam Gershenfeld (born December 1, 1959) is an American physicist. He is a professor in the MIT Program in Media Arts and Sciences and the director of the MIT Center for Bits and Atoms. He works mainly on interdisciplinary topics in physics and computer science, such as quantum computing, nanotechnology, and personal fabrication. He has been called the "intellectual father of the maker movement".

== Early life and education ==
Gershenfeld was born on December 1, 1959 in Ardmore, Pennsylvania to a Jewish family. His father, Walter Gershenfeld, was a labor arbitrator and mediator and emeritus professor of management at Temple University, and his mother Gladys Gershenfeld who was also an arbitrator.

He attended Plymouth-Whitemarsh High School in Plymouth Meeting, Pennsylvania. Later he attended Swarthmore College, graduating in 1981 with a B.A. degree in physics with high honors. In 1990, he earned a Ph.D. in physics at Cornell University; his thesis was titled Representation of chaos.

He received an honorary doctorate from Swarthmore College in 2006. In 2012 he received an honorary doctorate from Strathclyde University.

== Career ==
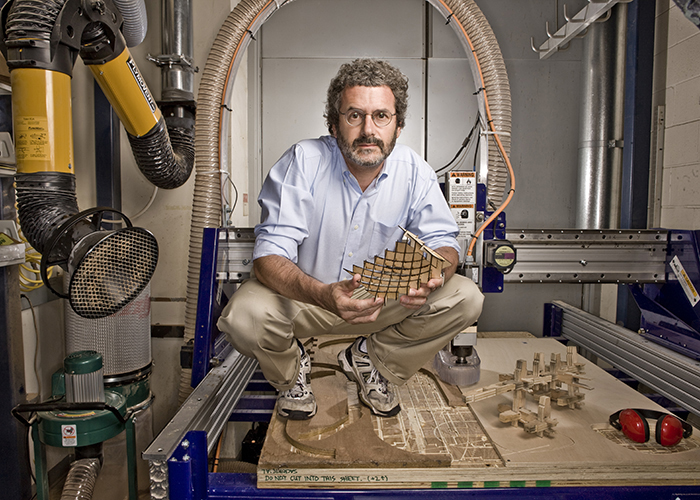
Gershenfeld in 2008

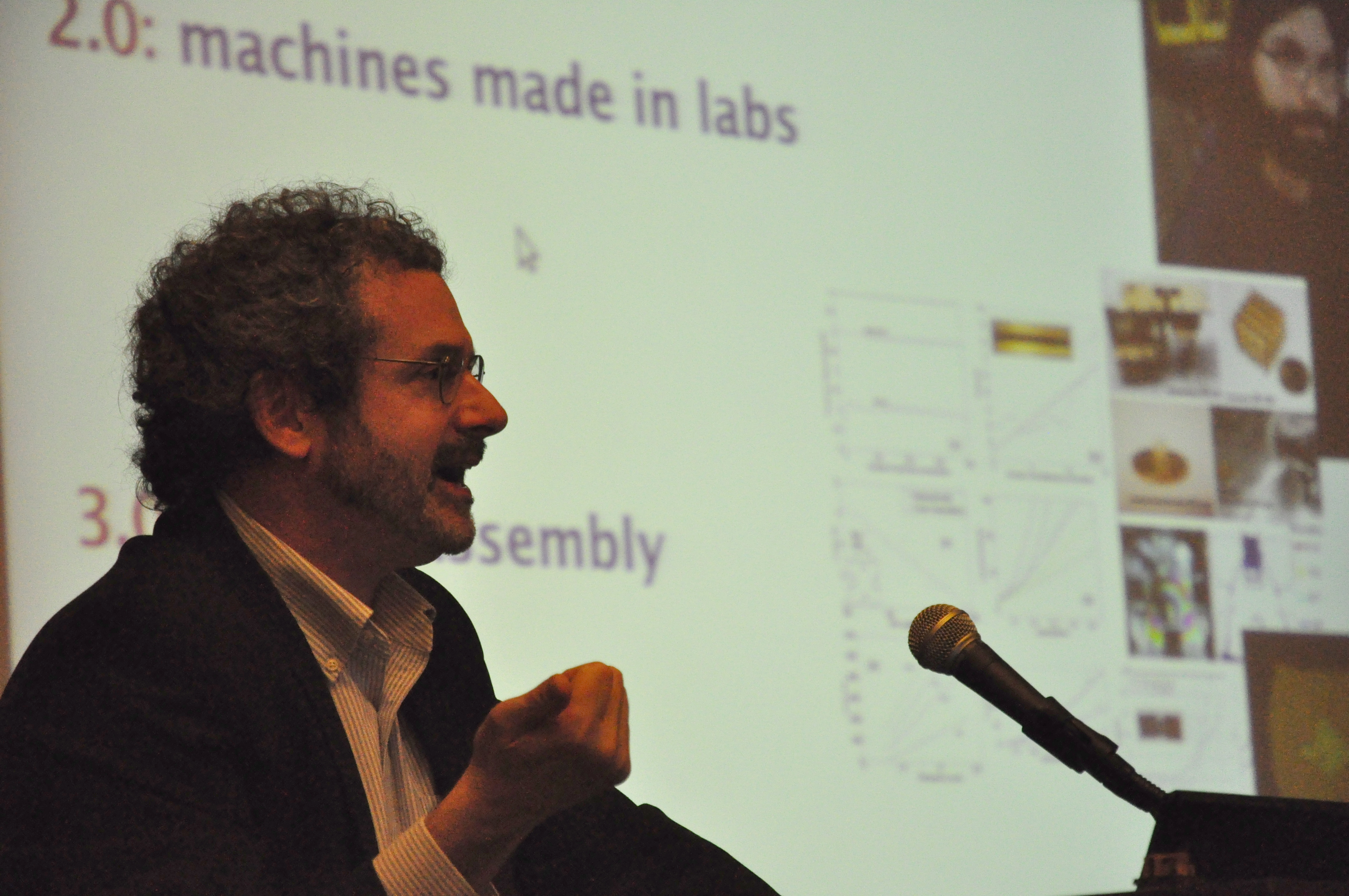
Gershenfeld as keynote speaker at APMM 2010

In 1998, Gershenfeld started a class at MIT called "How to make (almost) anything". Gershenfeld wanted to introduce expensive, industrial-size machines to the technical students. However, this class attracted a lot of students from various backgrounds: artists, architects, designers, students without any technical background. In his interview to CNN, Gershenfeld said that "the students... were answering a question I didn't ask, which is: What is this stuff good for? And the answer is: Not to make what you can buy in stores, but to make what you can't buy in stores. It's to personalise fabrication". Gershenfeld believes that this is the beginning of a new revolution: digital revolution in fabrication that will allow people to fabricate things, machines on demand.

Gershenfeld has presented his course on "How to make (almost) anything" at the Association of Professional Model Makers (APMM) 2010 Conference. In 2023, his course won the Irwin Sizer Award for the Most Significant Improvement to MIT education.

This class later has led Gershenfeld to create Fab lab. Gershenfeld feels very passionate about this project, as he believes that teaching kids how to use technology and create it themselves will empower the future generations to become more independent and create technology that each individual community needs, not a technology that is currently available on the market. Fab labs exist in over 150 countries. In his interview with Discover magazine on the question what personal fabrication might be useful for, Gershenfeld said, "There is a surprising need for emergent technologies in many of the least developed places on the planet. While our needs might be fairly well met, there are billions of people on the planet whose needs are not. Their problems don't need incremental tweaks in current technology, but a revolution".

Gershenfeld chairs Fab Foundation, leads the Fab Academy, which grew into the "Academany" platform for distributed hands-on education.

In addition to the "How to make (almost) anything" course, Gershenfeld has taught "How To Make Something That Makes (almost) Anything", "The Physics of Information Technology", "The Nature of Mathematical Modeling".

He was involved in starting the Interspecies Internet where he is a Founding Trustee.

Gershenfeld has spoken at TED conferences, and presented at the World Economic Forum in Davos.

=== Quantum computing pioneer ===
In 1998, Gershenfield and associates built the first quantum computer (2-qubit) that could be loaded with data and output a solution. Although impractical, it demonstrated the principles of quantum computation, it was the first significant faster-than-classical quantum computation.

=== Ultralight material ===
In 2013, Gershenfeld and fellow researchers at MIT introduced reversibly assembled cellular composite materials.

=== Other research ===
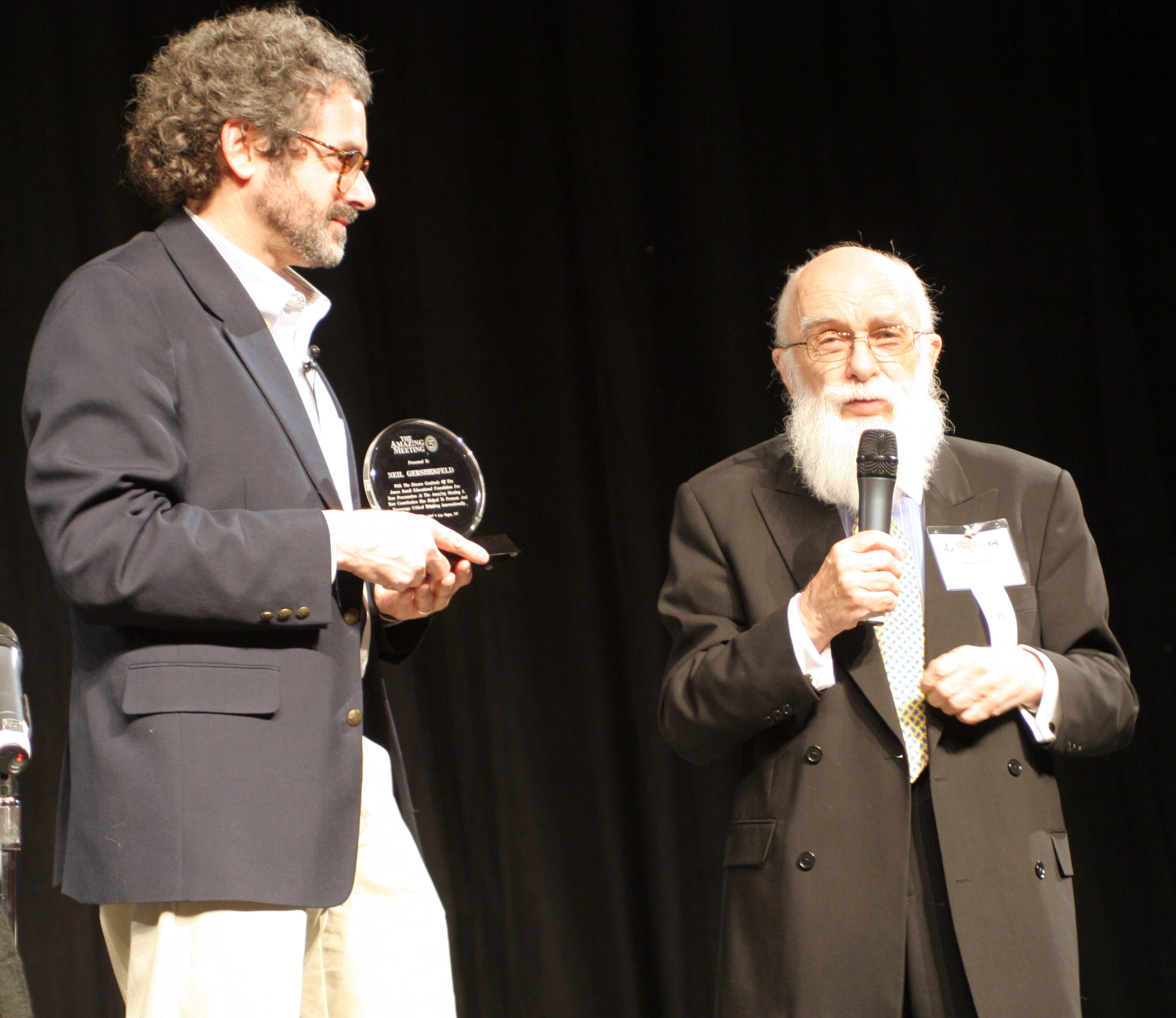
Gershenfeld with James Randi at TAM 5

His work has been published in Science, Nature, IEEE, ACM, Cell, and many other journals, as well as in The American Physical Society journal.

Gershenfeld published an early paper on what became known as the Internet of Things. His paper "Microfluidic bubble logic" introduced digital logic in microfluidics. His paper on "Physical one-way functions" introduced the concept of physical one-way functions.

Gershenfeld released the Great Invention Kit in 2008, a construction set that users can manipulate to create various objects.

== Honors and recognition ==
Gershenfeld is a Fellow of the American Physical Society (2007). He is a Fellow of the American Association for the Advancement of Science (2020). He is an elected Member of the National Academy of Engineering (2023).

Scientific American named Gershenfeld one of their "Scientific American 50" for 2004 and has also named him Communications Research Leader of the Year. Gershenfeld has been featured in The New York Times, in The Economist, and on NPR. He was named as one of the 40 modern-day Leonardos by the Museum of Science and Industry Chicago. Prospect named him as one of the top 100 public intellectuals.

== Jeffrey Epstein encounters ==
In July 2019, it was revealed that the director of the MIT Media Lab, Joi Ito, had accepted several large donations from Jeffrey Epstein; Ito later resigned in the ensuing scandal. According to a 2020 investigation by Goodwin Procter, published at the request of the MIT Corporation, Gershenfeld and other faculty had encountered Epstein three times during MIT Lab tours between June and October 2013. During one tour, Esptein expressed an interest in Gershenfeld's research work including consciousness, and signaling and deception by animals. After the initial meeting at MIT, Gershenfeld accepted a dinner invitation to Epstein's home in New York City. Confirming this, emails from the Epstein files showed that in 2013, Epstein requested that Gershenfeld invite artist Jeff Koons to Epstein's home for dinner.

== Bibliography ==
- Gershenfeld, Neil (1999). The Nature of Mathematical Modeling. Cambridge University Press. ISBN 978-0-521-57095-4.; 1st edition. 1998; hbk, 356 pages
- Neil A. Gershenfeld (2000). When Things Start to Think. Henry Holt and Company. ISBN 978-0-8050-5880-2; 2000 pbk edition of 1999 hbk edition; Gershenfeld, Neil (1999). 1st edition. Macmillan. ISBN 978-0-8050-5874-1. (hbk)
- Gershenfeld, Neil (2011). The Physics of Information Technology. Cambridge University Press. ISBN 978-0-521-21022-5. 1st edition. 2000.
- Gershenfeld, Neil (2011). Fab: The Coming Revolution on Your Desktop. ReadHowYouWant Limited. ISBN 978-1-4596-1057-6. Gershenfeld, Neil A. (2005). 1st edition. Basic Books. ISBN 978-0-465-02745-3.
- Gershenfeld, Neil; Gershenfeld, Alan; Cutcher-Gershenfeld, Joel (2017). Designing reality: How to survive and thrive in the third digital revolution. Basic Books. ISBN 9780465093489. ebook ISBN 9780465093489
