= Schrödinger's Kittens and the Search for Reality =

Book by John Gribbin

- Cover of the first British edition
- Author: John Gribbin
- Language: English
- Subject: Quantum theory
- Publication date: 1995
- Publication place: United States
- Media type: Print (Hardcover and Paperback)
- Pages: 261
- ISBN: 978-0316328197

Schrödinger's Kittens and the Search for Reality is a 1995 book by John Gribbin, in which the author attempts to explain the mysteries of modern quantum mechanics in a popular-scientific way. It is a sequel to his earlier book, In Search of Schrödinger's Cat (1984).

In his epilogue, Gribbin touches on what were then the most recent developments of string theory, and introduces the transactional interpretation of quantum mechanics as the new "mythology" of our time. His argument does not refute the theory, but demonstrates how all theories can be true and mythological (depending on one's perspective).
