= Sudeten Creche =

British band

Sudeten Creche were a British synth-pop band formed in 1980 as a semi-Warholian experiment. The original lineup featured Yvette Döll and Paul Carlin, working with associate members; Mark Warner joined in the early 1980s, with he and Carlin going on to represent the group in the long term. Sudeten Creche were known for the minimal electronic tracks "Are Kisses Out of Fashion?" and "Dance", which featured on their first release, Europe in the Year Zero (1982). This EP also included the Yazoo track "Goodbye 70's" and was the first official release by that band.

In 1983, Sudeten Creche supported singer Nico on her London tour dates and released the EP Kindergarten through Illuminated Records. It included the tracks "Kindergarten", "Dance" (instrumental and extended mix) and "Asylums in Beirut". Tiny Mix Tapes has described the group's sound as "minimal wave".

Norwegian band Apoptygma Berzerk have cited Sudeten Creche as an influence on their work.

== Influences ==
Sudeten Creche have drawn inspiration from artists such as Nico, the Velvet Underground (and Lou Reed), The Teardrop Explodes (and Julian Cope), Joy Division, Iggy Pop, Kraftwerk, Depeche Mode, D.A.F. and Cabaret Voltaire. Carlin has also namechecked Pere Ubu, the Human League, Echo & the Bunnymen, Throbbing Gristle and the Doors, while Warner has cited Yazoo, U2, the B-52s, Talking Heads, OMD, Soft Cell, Japan, Tubeway Army, New Order and the Smiths.
