= Saul Griffith =

Australian-American businessman

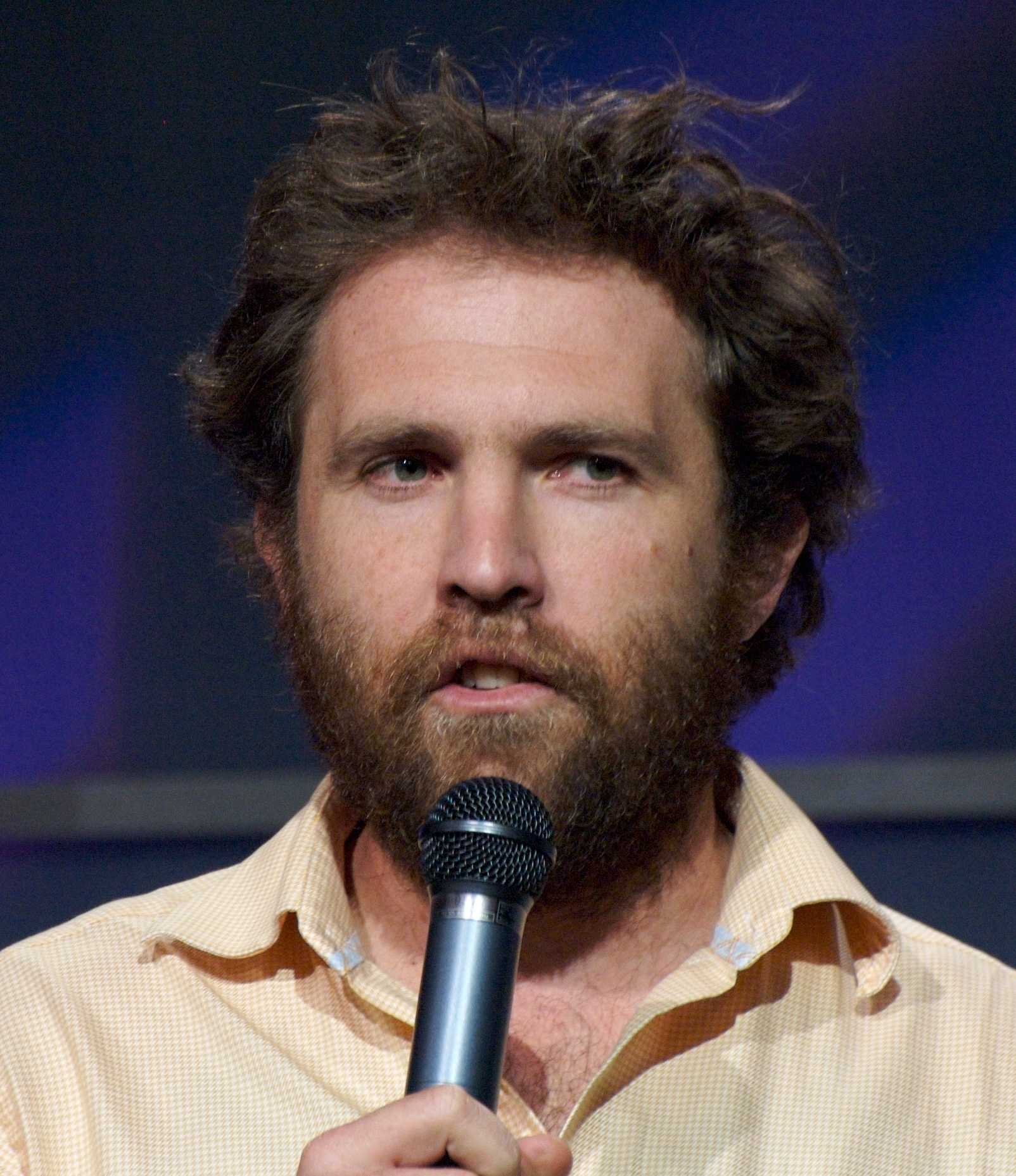
- Griffith in 2008
- Born: Australia
- Education: University of New South Wales (B.MET.E); University of Sydney (M.E.); Massachusetts Institute of Technology (PhD)
- Known for: Energy conservation, Otherlab, Makani Power, Rewiring America
- Spouse: Arwen O'Reilly Griffith
- Children: 2
- Awards: MacArthur Fellowship (2007)
- Scientific career
- Fields: Material science

Saul Griffith is an Australian–American inventor and renewable electricity advocate. He is the founder or co-founder of multiple companies, including Otherlab, Makani Power, Rewiring America, and Instructables. As of June 2026 he is chief scientist of OtherLab.

== Early life and education ==
Saul Griffith grew up in Sydney, New South Wales. His mother is a wildlife artist, early Greenpeace activist and printmaker, while his father is a retired professor.

Griffith graduated from the University of New South Wales with a B.MET.E, and then, in 2000, from the University of Sydney with a Master of Engineering degree. He won a scholarship to MIT Media Lab in Boston, Massachusetts, to study towards a PhD, that he completed in 2004. The subject of his thesis was "self-replicating machines". They were one of the first instances of artificial replication being demonstrated using real physics.

== Projects ==
Griffith is the co-founder and as of June 2026 chief scientist of OtherLab, a research and development company working on computational manufacturing and design tools and applying those tools to projects such as inflatable pneumatic robots and prostheses, novel approaches to heliostat design, and applications of computational origami to the design of pressure vessels (e.g. for compressed natural gas) in arbitrary shapes. Otherlab's R&D is guided by a vast map of energy flows in the US economy, which they use to identify key leverage points in building a more sustainable energy economy. Griffith used this energy flow mapping for Rewiring America, a nonprofit organization working on electrification, of which he is a co-founder. He argues that the United States can create 30 million jobs, save consumers money, boost energy resiliency, and accelerate achievement of a net zero economy.

Previously, he was a co-founder of Squid Labs, Makani Power, Instructables, Wattzon, HowToons, OptiOpia, Potenco, Sunfolding, Other Machine Company, and Monkeylectric.

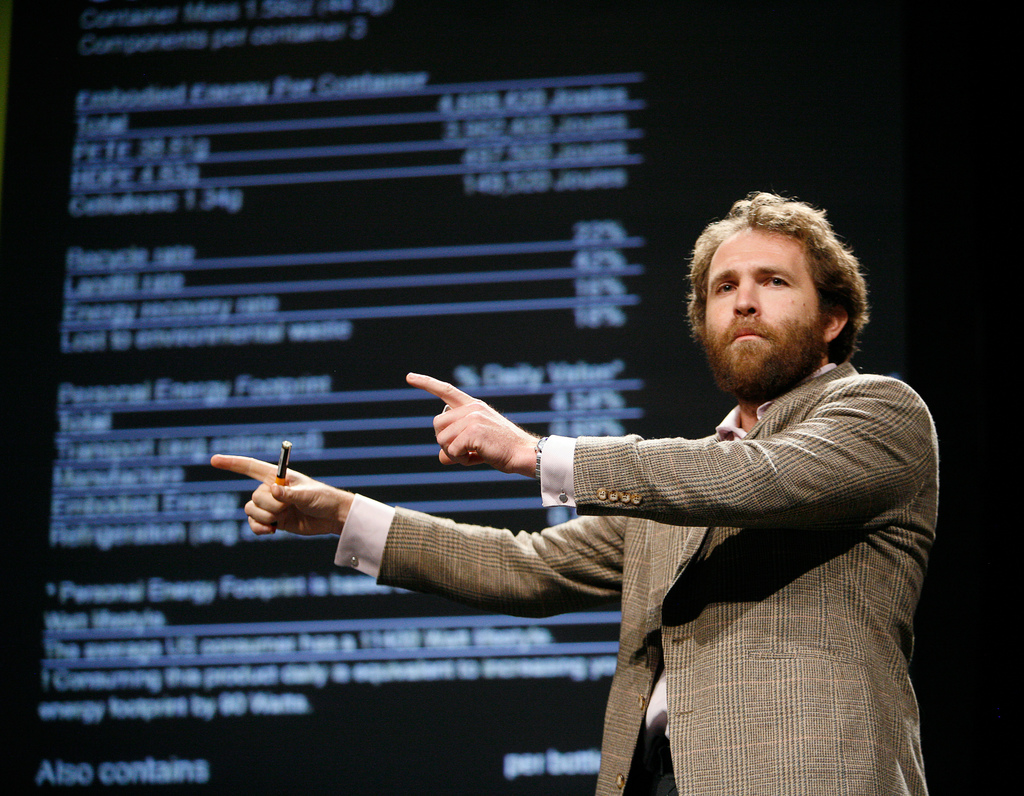
Griffith giving a talk at Poptech 2008

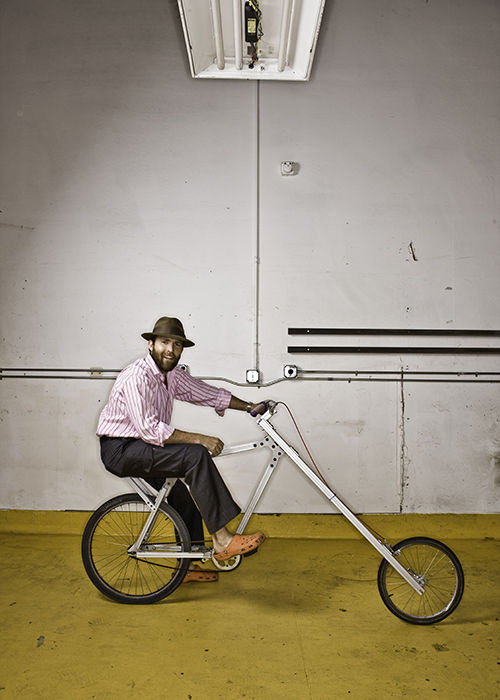
Griffith in 2008

== Personal life ==
Griffith lived in San Francisco for many years. He married Tim O'Reilly's daughter Arwen, and they have two children. After around 20 years in the US, he relocated with his family to Australia during the COVID-19 pandemic in 2021, settling in Wollongong, New South Wales.

A portrait of Griffith by artist Jude Rae was highly commended in the 2022 Archibald Prize.

== Publications ==
- Electrify: An Optimist's Playbook for Our Clean Energy Future (2021). Cambridge, Massachusetts: MIT University Press. ISBN 978-0-262-04623-7 (Hardcover edition) ISBN 978-0-262-54504-4 (Paperback edition)
- The Big Switch: Australia's Electric Future (2022). Collingwood, Victoria: Black Inc. Books. ISBN 978-1-76064-387-4 (paperback edition).
- The Wires That Bind: Electrification and Community Renewal (2023). Quarterly Essay 89. Collingwood, Victoria: Black Inc. Books. ISBN 978-1-76064-420-8 (paperback edition).
- Plug In! The Electrification Handbook (2025). Collingwood, Victoria: Black Inc. Books. ISBN 978-1-76064-515-1 (paperback edition).
