= Ostroushko =

Ostroushko (Russian: Остроушко, Ukrainian: Остроушко) is a surname of Ukrainian origin. Notable people with this surname include:

- Peter Ostroushko (1953–2021), American violinist and mandolinist
- Marge Ostroushko (born 1951), American public radio producer
- Vladimir Ostroushko (born 1986), Russian rugby union player
