= École 229 =

- École 229
- Established: 2021
- Founder: Blolab
- Location: Cotonou, Benin
- Official language: French
- Website: ecole229.bj

École 229 (School 229) is a digital school created by the fablab Blolab in Benin since 2021.

== Creation ==
Created and inaugurated on June 8, 2021, École 229 is located in Cotonou within the premises of Blolab.

It is an educational institution that offers an opportunity for educational catch-up and constitutes an active community of passionate individuals who respond to the needs of the local economic fabric in terms of skills and training levels.

== Objective ==
École 229 aims to promote the use of digital technology as a means of inclusion, allowing for the discovery of talents and ensuring their autonomy by promoting their professional integration in digital fields.

== Courses ==
École 229 offers two programs:

- Web and Mobile Development: This course lasts 9 months, including 6 months of classes and 3 months of alternating internships. It provides essential knowledge of programming languages to create web applications (websites and apps) as well as mobile applications compatible with different platforms.
- Fundamental Digital Skills: This course promotes the acquisition of solid expertise in digital skills. It plays an essential role in improving individuals' employability and enhancing their ability to adapt to the rapid changes in the digital world.

== Admission ==
No prerequisites are required to access the training offered by École 229, except for strong motivation and a solid professional project.

== See also ==
- Blolab
