= IAAC =

IAAC is an abbreviation that could stand for the following:

- Indo-American Arts Council, an American non-profit cultural organization that promotes Indian culture
- Institute for Advanced Architecture of Catalonia, international centre of education and research in Catalonia
- Irish American Athletic Club, an athletic club in the United States
- International Assets Holding Corporation, a Fortune 500 integrated commodity risk management company whose NASDAQ identifier is IAAC
- International Academy of Advanced Conducting after Ilya Musin, a week-long orchestral conducting workshop (hosted twice a year) based on the techniques established by Ilya Musin.
- Inter-American Accreditation Cooperation, a regional organization that promotes cooperation and mutual recognition among accreditation bodies in the Americas
