= Emily Botein =

American public radio producer

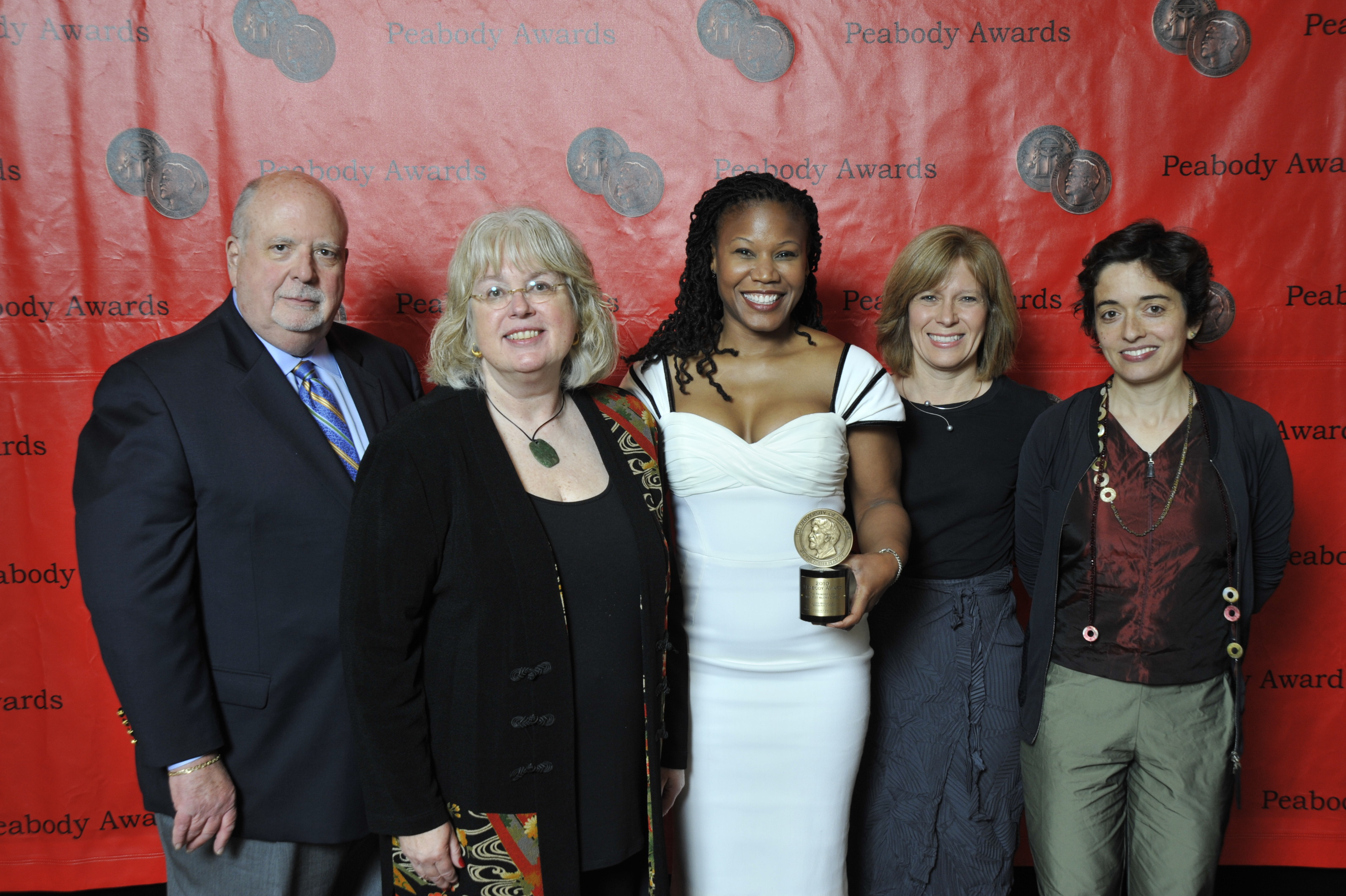
Fred Young (juror), Marge Ostroushko, Majora Carter, Mary Beth Kircher and Emily Botein, with the Peabody Award for The Promised Land (left to right)

Emily Botein is an American public radio producer. Botein is currently Vice President for Original Programming at WNYC, where she “works with colleagues to identify talent, produce pilots and launch shows”.

Botein graduated high school from Commonwealth School in 1987 and graduated from Amherst College in 1991. She was an appetizer cook at four-star New York restaurant The Quilted Giraffe from 1992 until it closed in 1993. Botein used her unemployment money from that job to move to Washington, D.C. to pursue an internship at WAMU's Derek McGinty Show and work at the Folk Life office.

Botein's first full-time radio job came in 1999, making pieces about food for NPR. Botein helped launch The Next Big Thing at WNYC, and served as its senior producer until its last episode in 2005. As an independent producer since then, she has contributed to shows including Studio 360 and American Routes. Botein won a Peabody Award in 2010 for her work producing The Promised Land.

Botein had been a producer at WNYC when the World Trade Center was attacked., and co-produced WNYC's radio special Living 9/11 in 2011. In 2015, she was promoted to the position of Vice President for On-Demand Content in 2015. She has helped create many shows for WNYC, including Death, Sex and Money, Here's the Thing with Alec Baldwin, and The New Yorker Radio Hour.
