= Qing Chang =

Mechanical engineer

Qing (Cindy) Chang is a Chinese–American production engineer whose research combines control theory and machine learning in smart manufacturing. She is a professor of engineering at the University of Virginia, jointly appointed in the Department of Mechanical and Aerospace Engineering and in the Department of Systems and Information Engineering. She co-chairs the Technical Committee for Sustainable Production Automation of the IEEE Robotics & Automation Society.

== Education and career ==
Chang has a 1991 bachelor's degree from Beijing University of Technology. She came to the US for graduate study in engineering, and earned a master's degree in 1996 at the University of Wisconsin–Madison. She completed her doctorate in manufacturing in 2006 at the University of Michigan.

After working in industry for ten years as a senior research engineer for General Motors, Chang returned to academia as an associate professor of mechanical engineering at Stony Brook University. She moved to her present position at the University of Virginia in 2019.

== Recognition ==
At General Motors, Chang was part of teams that won the GM Boss Kettering Award three times and the GM R&D Charles L. McCuen Special Achievement Award three times.

Chang was elected as an ASME Fellow in the 2019 class of fellows. In 2020 the Society of Manufacturing Engineers (SME) named her as one of "20 most influential professors in smart manufacturing". She is also a Fellow of SME.
