= Majora Carter =

American businesswoman, radio host (born 1966)

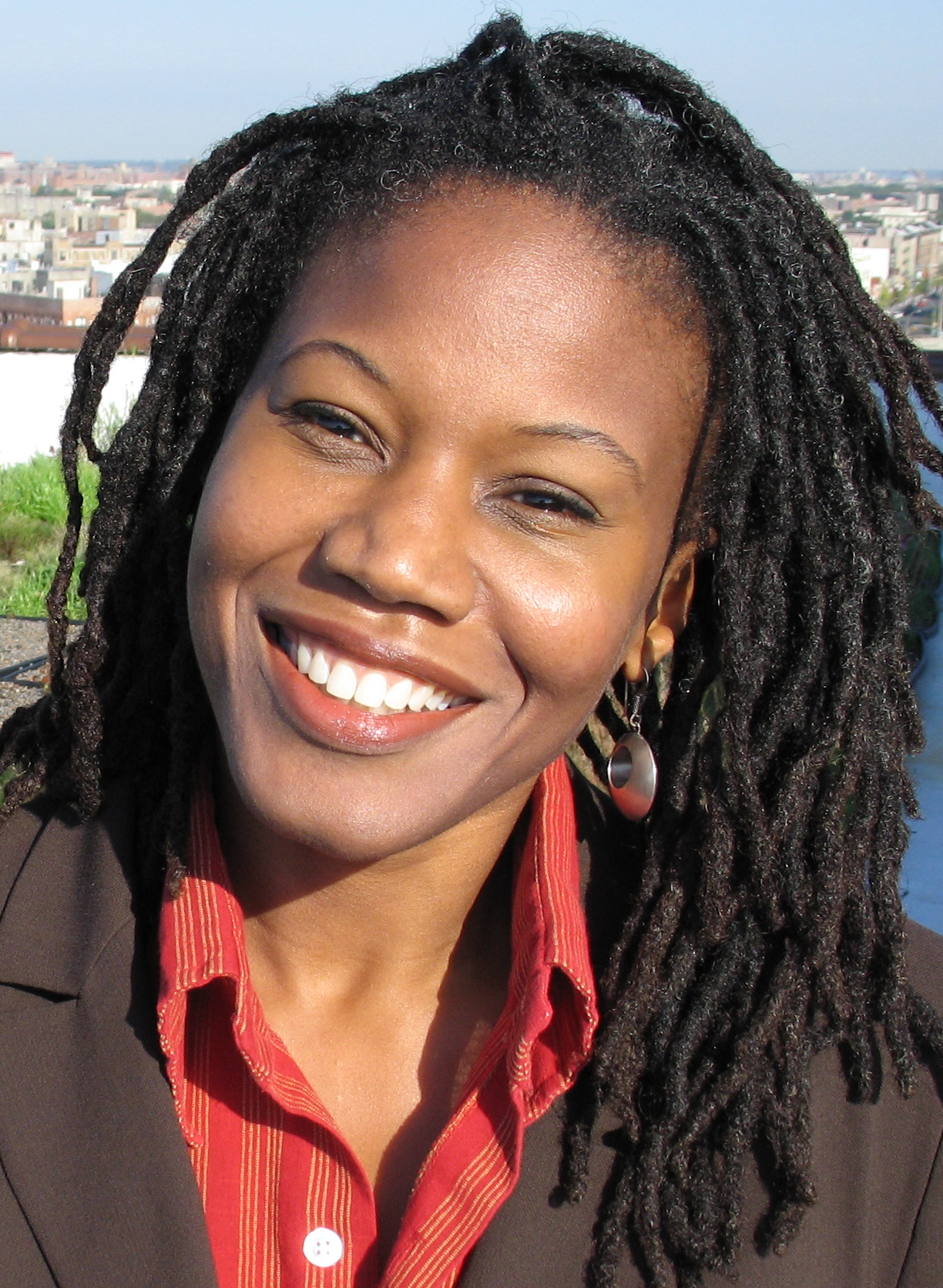
- Carter, 2009
- Born: October 27, 1966 (age 60); New York, New York, U.S.
- Education: Wesleyan University (BA); New York University (MFA)
- Website: majoracartergroup.com

Majora Carter (born October 27, 1966) is an American urban revitalization strategist and public radio host from the South Bronx area of New York City. Carter founded and led the non-profit environmental justice solutions corporation Sustainable South Bronx from 2001 onward, before entering the private sector in 2008.

== Early life ==
After graduating from the Bronx High School of Science, Carter entered Wesleyan University in 1984 to study film and went on to obtain a Bachelor of Arts. In 1997, she received a Master of Fine Arts from New York University (NYU). While at NYU, she returned to her family's home in Hunts Point.

== Career ==
=== Advocacy ===
In August 2001, after declining to engage in a campaign for NY City Council, Carter founded Sustainable South Bronx (SSBx), where she served as executive director until July 2008. During that time, SSBx advocated the development of the Hunts Point Riverside Park which had been an illegal garbage dump. Carter was a co-founder of the Bronx River Alliance, and SSBx continued to carry on Carter's involvement in Bronx River waterfront restoration projects. In 2003, Sustainable South Bronx started the Bronx Environmental Stewardship Training program, one of the nation's first urban green collar training and placement systems. Other SSBx projects have centered around fitness, the creation of a community market, and air quality. In 2007, Carter co-founded Green for All with Van Jones. A December 2008 New York Times profile called Carter "The Green Power Broker" and "one of the city's best-known advocates for environmental justice" but reported that some South Bronx activists (who would not go on record) stated that Carter has taken credit for accomplishments when others should share the credit as well as taking credit for uncompleted projects. Other Bronx activists (who did agree to be named) stated that her recognition was well deserved.

Carter was a torch-bearer for a portion of the San Francisco leg of the torch relay of the 2008 Summer Olympics. Many portions of the torch relay, including the San Francisco leg, were met with protests concerning the policies of the Chinese government toward Tibet. Although Carter had signed a contract pledging not to use an Olympic venue for political or religious causes, when she and John Caldera were passed the torch during their part of the relay, she pulled out a small Tibetan flag that she had concealed in her shirt sleeve.

Members of the Chinese torch security escort team pulled her out of the relay and San Francisco police officers pushed her into the crowd on the side of the street. Fellow torch-bearer and retired NYFD firefighter Richard Doran called Carter's actions "disgusting and appalling" and said that he thought "she dishonored herself and her family". Another torch-bearer, retired NYPD police officer Jim Dolan, agreed with Doran.

=== Media ===
Majora Carter's TED talk was one of the first six publicly released talks to launch the TED website in 2006. Carter gave a second TED talk in 2022, making her the only Black woman who is not an entertainer to be invited to their stage twice. Carter has made appearances in, written, and produced television and radio programs, including HBO's The Black List: Volume 2, American Public Media's Market Place, and PRX's This I Believe series and has hosted several pieces on urban sustainability with Discovery Communications' Science Channel.

She has been featured in corporate promotional videos and advertisements for companies such as Cisco Systems, Frito-Lay, Intel, Holiday Inn, HSBC, Visa, Mazda and Honda.

In 2014, Carter was the on-camera and voiceover host of "Water Blues - Green Solutions", a documentary on Green Infrastructure in several American cities, produced by Pennsylvania State University TV for the Public TV Market. In 2015, Carter played "TSA Agent 1" opposite Meryl Streep in Ricky and the Flash, directed by Johnathon Demme.

From 2007 to 2010, Carter co-hosted on The Green, a television segment dedicated to the environment, shown on the Sundance Channel. The first season consisted of a series of 90 second op-eds shot in studio. The second season consisted of a series of short interview pieces with individuals taking uncommon approaches to environmental problems.

In 2008, Carter and Marge Ostroushko co-produced the pilot episode of the public radio show, The Promised Land (radio), which won a 3-way competition for a Corporation for Public Broadcasting Talent Quest grant. The one-hour programs debuted on over 150 public radio stations across the US on January 19, 2009, was renewed for the 2010/2011 season, and earned a 2010 Peabody Award, but went unsupported by the public radio funding organizations after that period, and has since stopped production.

Carter co-authored a white paper on urban heat island mitigation and a peer-reviewed article, Elemental carbon and PM(2.5) levels in an urban community heavily impacted by truck traffic.

In February 2022 Penguin Random House released Ms. Carter's first book, Reclaiming Your Community: You Don't Have to Move Out of Your Neighborhood to Live in a Better One published by Berret-Koehler Publishers.

In 2024, Carter discussed her work and the founding of Sustainable South Bronx, as well as the book The Power Broker by Robert Caro, on the 99% Invisible podcast.

=== Consulting ===
After leaving Sustainable South Bronx, Carter has served as president of a private consulting firm, Majora Carter Group, LLC (MCG). In the June 2010 issue of Fast Company magazine, Carter was listed as one of the 100 Most Creative People in Business. In 2014, B Corporation (certification) recognized MCG as one of the "Best for the World" according to its ranking among other B Corps of similar size.

In 2012, Carter's consulting firm, Majora Carter Group LLC (MCG) accepted FreshDirect as a client to help the company connect to local organizations prior to its proposed relocation to the Harlem River Yards in the South Bronx.

Activists opposed to the relocation claimed New York City Government and FreshDirect failed to conduct sufficient environmental review and community outreach. A lawsuit and boycott campaign were initiated to stop the relocation. That lawsuit was dismissed, and a subsequent appeal was also dismissed; both were filed by New York Lawyers for the Public Interest. Sustainable South Bronx, an organization Carter founded, opposed FreshDirect's move to the Bronx.

Subsequent votes by Bronx Community Board 1 and the NYC Industrial Development Agency both voted to approve the move to the Bronx.

The project broke ground December 22, 2014, and was scheduled to be completed before the end of 2016. FreshDirect started hiring in the Bronx ahead of its move in anticipation. Consistent with activists' concerns over increased truck traffic as a result of the new FreshDirect facility, a study found that the opening the FreshDirect warehouse "significantly increased truck and vehicle flow, especially for overnight time windows, and that for one traffic monitoring site, resulting changes were not adequately predicted by the facility’s environmental assessment prior to construction."

=== Tech-Economy Inclusion ===
In 2007, while running Sustainable South Bronx, Majora Carter introduced MIT's first ever Mobile fab lab (digital fabrication laboratory) to the South Bronx, where it served as an early iteration of a maker spaces.

In 2013, Carter joined the advisory board of the Bronx Academy of Software Engineering High School. After co-founding StartUp Box #SouthBronx in 2012 as a social enterprise to seed diverse participation in the knowledge economy, she launched StartUp Box #QA, a quality assurance testing service, which assisted in the launch of Mayor Bill DeBlasio's Digital.NYC in 2014. StartUp Box to victory won the pitch contest at the national Blogher Conference in 2015 with $250,000 worth of in-kind services from SheKnows Media.

The social enterprise also won second place in the MIT Inclusion Innovation and the Village Capital & Kapoor Capital People Ops Competitions in 2016 (each garnering a $25,000 prize), as well as the Digital Diversity Network's Code Breaker Award in 2016.

She is a BusinessInsider.com 'Silicon Alley 100', and her 2006 TEDtalk was one of 6 on the launch of its website. Carter is also a co-founder of the Bronx Tech Meetup. She served as a judge for the NYC Office of Digital Media's "Reinvent Payphones Design Challenge".

=== Awards and honors ===
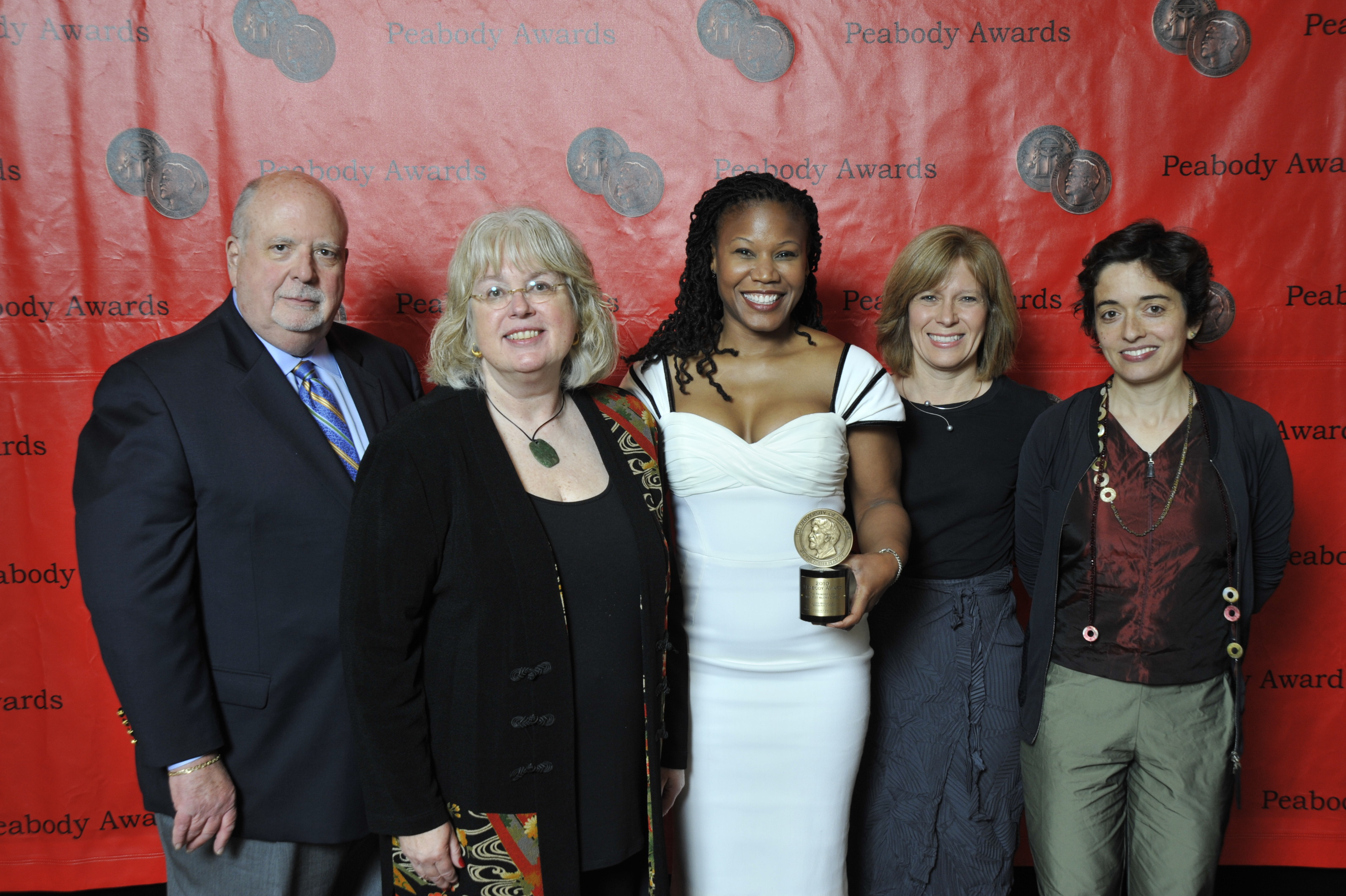
Marge Ostroushko, Majora Carter, Mary Beth Kircher and Emily Botein with award for The Promised Land at the 70th Annual Peabody Awards

- 2024 Commendation for Outstanding Teaching, Princeton University
- 2020 Edmund N. Bacon Urban Design Award
- 2017 Visionary Leadership Award - Arts & Ideas
- 2016 MIT Inclusion Innovation Competition – Finalist
- 2016 Digital Diversity Network – Innovation & Inclusion Awards Honoree
- 2015 Blogher 2015 – Winner: Pitch Contest for StartUp Box Quality Assurance B2B Social Enterprise
- 2014 Augsburg College – Honorary PhD
- 2013 Middlebury College CSE Vision Award
- 2013 Honorary PhD: Wesleyan University
- 2011 Commencement speaker at Knox College
- 2010 Peabody Award for The Promised Land
- 2010 Star Award: International Interior Design Association (IIDA)
- 2009 Fellow: Post Carbon Institute
- 2009 Honor Award: Visionary in Sustainability, by the National Building Museum
- 2008 Named a "visionary" as one of Utne Reader magazine's "50 Visionaries Who Are Changing the World"
- 2008 Appointed to America's Climate Choices: Panel on Limiting the Magnitude of Future Climate Change: National Academy of Sciences
- 2008 The Eleanor Roosevelt Val-Kill Medal: Eleanor Roosevelt Society
- 2008 Hollister Award: United Nations Temple of Understanding
- 2008 Paul Wellstone Award: Campaign for America's Future
- 2007 Rachel Carson Award: National Audubon Society
- 2007 New York State Women of Excellence Award: Lt. Gov. David Paterson
- 2007 Honorary PhD: Mercy College
- 2007 Martin Luther King Jr. Award for Community Service: NYU
- 2007 Lawrence Enersen Award: National Arbor Day Society
- 2005 Fellow: John D. and Catherine T. MacArthur Foundation
- 2002 Union Square Award: Fund for the City of New York

She is a Fellow of the New York Institute for the Humanities.
