= Mobile fab lab =

Mobile fab lab

The mobile fab lab is a computer-controlled design and machining fab lab housed in a trailer. The first was built in August 2007 by the Center for Bits and Atoms at the Massachusetts Institute of Technology. The mobile lab includes the same computer-controlled fabrication machines found in fab labs worldwide.

== The MIT Center for Bits and Atoms Mobile Lab ==
The fab lab trailer is a 2007 Pace American Shadow GT Daytona dual axle (model SCX8528TA3). It is 32 feet (9.8 m) long, 8 feet (2.4 m) wide, and 7 feet (2.1 m) high. The tailgate opens to add a 6 feet (1.8 m) deck at the back of the trailer. The main entrance is a door on the passenger side towards the front. A 6.5 feet (2.0 m) tall custom steel box covers most of the tongue. The lab requires a space approximately 60 feet (18 m) long by 16 feet (4.9 m) wide for operation as a lab. The power requirements are 240 V single phase with minimum 40 A service. To run all the equipment in the lab at once (including AC and overhead lights) is about 20 kW; to run only the 120 V equipment is about 8 kW.

Two graffiti artists from the South Bronx were invited to design and paint the sides and top of the trailer in two weekends.

This lab contains custom cabinetry which is an example of a lab producing a part of another lab. The cabinetry was CAD-designed and fabricated on a CNC wood router similar to the wood router in the trailer. The router in the trailer is capable of making another set of cabinets.

The lab debuted in August 2007 in Chicago, Illinois during The Fourth International Fab Lab Forum and Symposium on Digital Fabrication. Its maiden road trip from Chicago to Nevada to Boston included short visits to Black Rock City, the National Renewable Energy Laboratory, the Nebraska State Fair, Gadgetoff at the Liberty Science Center. It is now loaned to organizations for months or longer, typically to help create a permanent lab in that location. These have included Sustainable South Bronx; Lorain, Ohio; Detroit, Michigan; and Washington, D.C.

== List of equipment ==
The equipment included in mobile fab labs is typically a subset of the complete list of equipment for a regular fab lab, with the most common omissions being multiplications of general purpose items such as computer workstations. The original equipment list for the MIT CBA Mobile Fab Lab:

- 5 Dell GX620 computers and 17" LCD monitors. All computers are dual-boot Ubuntu Linux and Microsoft Windows XP.
- LG flat panel wide screen monitor 32"
- 1Gbit router, 802.11 access point, 3G cellular modem
- (1) Epilog 24" × 12" laser cutter
- (1) Roland Modela MDX-20 Mini-mill
- (1) Roland CAMM-1 GX-24 wide vinyl cutter
- (1) Shopbot PRS 48" × 96" CNC wood router with high speed spindle
- (1) Grizzly 4HP dust extraction system (for wood router dust removal)
- (1) Purex HEPA filter (for laser cutter fume removal)
- (1) HP OfficeJet 6210 All-In-One scanner, color inkjet printer, fax machine
- (1) Dustbuster vacuum cleaner
- (1) 1 gallon shop vac
- (-) hand tools such as screwdrivers, pliers, clamps, etc.
- (1) Function Generator, 10 MHz DDS with Counter
- (1) Power Supply, Triple Output, DC, Digital, 30 V, 3 A
- (1) Digital Storage Oscilloscope, 150 MHz, Color
- (5) Digital multimeter
- (2) 50 W soldering stations
- electronics parts: resistors, capacitors, chokes, diodes, transistors, regulators, LEDs, photodetectors, loudspeakers and microphones, thermistors, op-amps, microcontrollers, resonators, buttons and switches, magnets, headers, jacks and plugs, ribbon cable and connectors, test clips, heat shrink tubing, solder/desolder, battery connections, batteries, motors, transducers, bell wire, magnet wire, blank PCB substrate.

== Other mobile labs ==
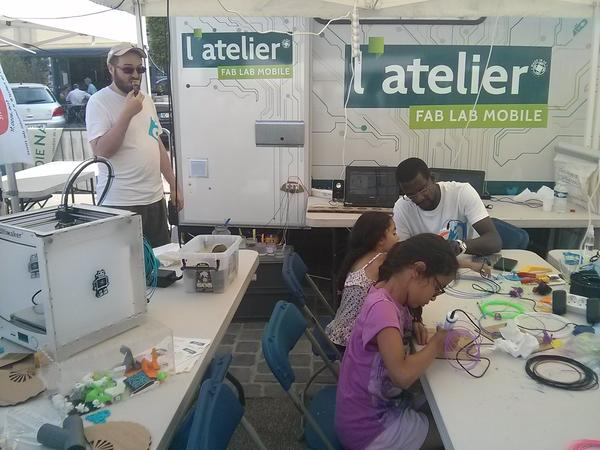
L'Atelier, an open-access road-mobile Fab lab involving local government "Oise" deployed to the 2015 Libre Software Meeting in Beauvais, France.

- 2009: South Africa Centre for Scientific and Industrial Research (CSIR) operates a mobile lab based out of Pretoria, South Africa.
- 2010: The MC2STEM school in the Cleveland Metropolitan School District operates a mobile lab as part of CMSD Fab, primarily in the midwest USA area.
- 2010: Amersfoort Fab Lab in the Netherlands operates a fab lab truck in Europe. In addition to several locations in the Netherlands, they have been to Germany and Scotland.
- 2014 STE(A)M Truck, a program of Community Guilds Inc., was launched to bring tools, talent, and technology to communities without access.
- 2014: “TechShop Inside! — Powered by Fujitsu,” a mobile makerspace for students of all ages in the form of a 24-foot trailer equipped with some of TechShop's most popular building and prototyping technologies.
- 2014: North Central Michigan College's “Mobile Digital FAB LAB,” is a customized fab lab designed and built by Triune Specialty Trailers to serve as an educational outreach trailer that gives students hands-on training for highly specialized manufacturing jobs.
- 2014: The FryskLab, a mobile FabLab in The Netherlands. The FryskLab is the Europe's first library Fablab, initiate by Fers, the Service provider for public libraries in the Province of Friesland, in The Netherland.
- 2015 : L'Atelier's mobile Fab Lab, in France. This Fab Lab has been created by the local government of Oise in France. (In French).
- 2015: Industrial designers from Madlab Chile develop the Aconcagua Fablab, the first in this class in Latin America.
- 2016: The Research Center for Innovation – VERITAS University from Costa Rica creates the First Mobile Fab Lab from Central America.

== See also ==
- Hackerspace
