= Urban manufacturing =

Production of goods within urban areas

Urban manufacturing, or urban production, refers to the production of goods in urban areas, designed considering local culture and characteristics and intended to be distributed to the same local communities. The fundamental principle is the creation of goods taking into account the surrounding environment. Developing products in an urban area does not, by definition, make production urban.

Urban manufacturing is characterised by the use of local resources, including expertise, materials, and financial support, to produce goods that reflect the local community, such as food.

Thanks to the technological advancement in manufacturing, like specific branches of Smart manufacturing such as 3D printing, the production in urban areas is facilitated. The advent of digital fabrication, marked by the proliferation of machines capable of producing goods from digital designs, has profoundly impacted the landscape of technological innovation in this field. Concurrently, the spread of Fab labs and Makerspaces has facilitated widespread access to these fabrication technologies, thereby making them more accessible to the general public.

== History ==
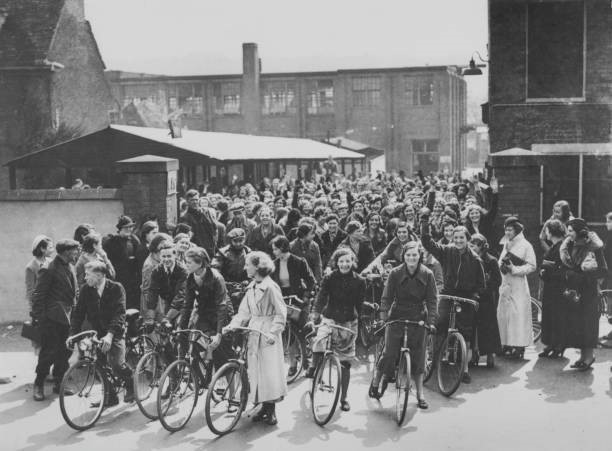
KLG spark plug factory, Putney Vale, Greater London, 1937

The perception of factories as noisy buildings or places has been around for a long time, and this view applies to any environment in which they are located. As a result, there was a significant relocation of these factories in the 1950s, mainly to rural areas. While this action addressed the issue of noise and environmental concerns, it also introduced a new challenge: the increasing distance between the use of products and the manufacturing centre, as well as the sourcing of raw materials.

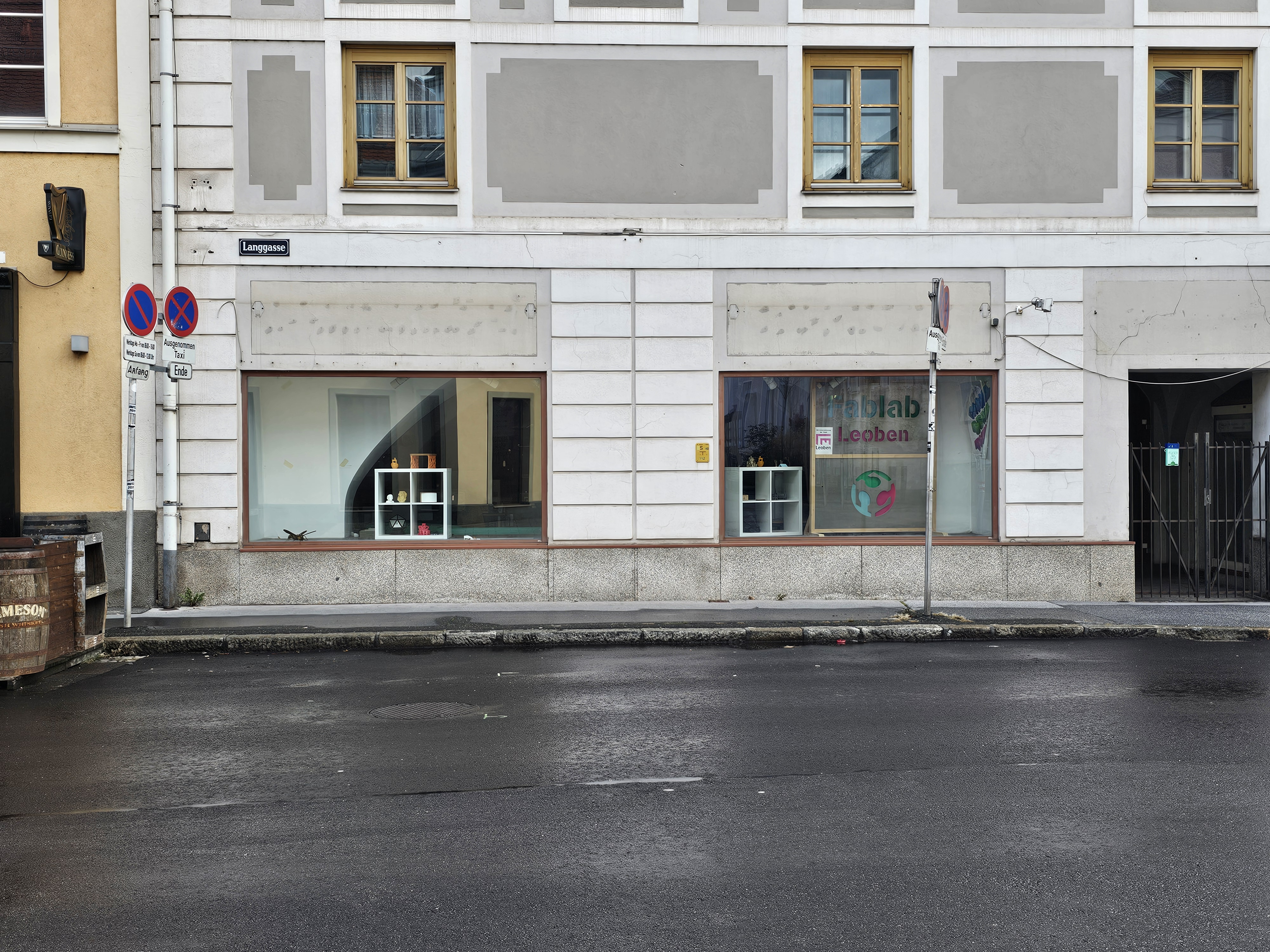
FabLab Leoben, in Austria. This urban factory is integrated into a residential area.

Following the closing of numerous production facilities in the late 20th century, there has been a resurgence of interest in manufacturing in the US and Europe in recent years. This phenomenon can be attributed to the post-recession period, particularly the Great Recession, which led to a resurgence of interest in a previously declining industry. This renewed interest has been fuelled by the emergence of new technologies, the return of specific activities, such as manual labour, the growth of interest in Makerspaces, and the rise in demand for small-scale production facilities, particularly in urban areas. This has led to the establishment of urban factories, thereby contributing to the development of urban manufacturing. These novel initiatives differ from those that emerged in the late 20th century. The new manufacturing facilities are better suited to urban environments due to their smaller size, community-based nature, specialised skills, and collaborative approach with various urban movements.

This research topic has proven to be of interest to various communities, with cities demonstrating a growing interest in this particular type of manufacturing. However, research studies conducted on this subject are still in their nascent stages. The current literature offers a variety of definitions and approaches to urban manufacturing, although these do align with the same broader direction and concept.

== Typologies of Urban Factories ==
The term 'urban factory' is defined in various ways in scientific literature. Specifically, the terms 'urban manufacturing' and 'urban production' are used to refer to the same concept, with the former being preferred in some circles. Overall, the term can be associated with factories that have been encapsulated within urban areas. In this regard, two distinct examples can be provided: firstly, factories that have been incorporated into an expanding city; and secondly, factories that have been introduced into an existing city.

Furthermore, the exchange of information between the factory and the urban area surrounding it is a crucial aspect to consider, as it leads to the emergence of two distinct typologies of urban factories: the full urban factory and the semi-urban factory. The former is characterised by its complete engagement with the city and the sources it produces, encompassing the entire manufacturing cycle from source materials, labour, and outputs such as products made from and for the same urban area. The second typology is defined as partially engaging with sources and eventually outputting products outside the immediate urban area, despite the factory location being urban. This final typology of factory is not always regarded as urban manufacturing.

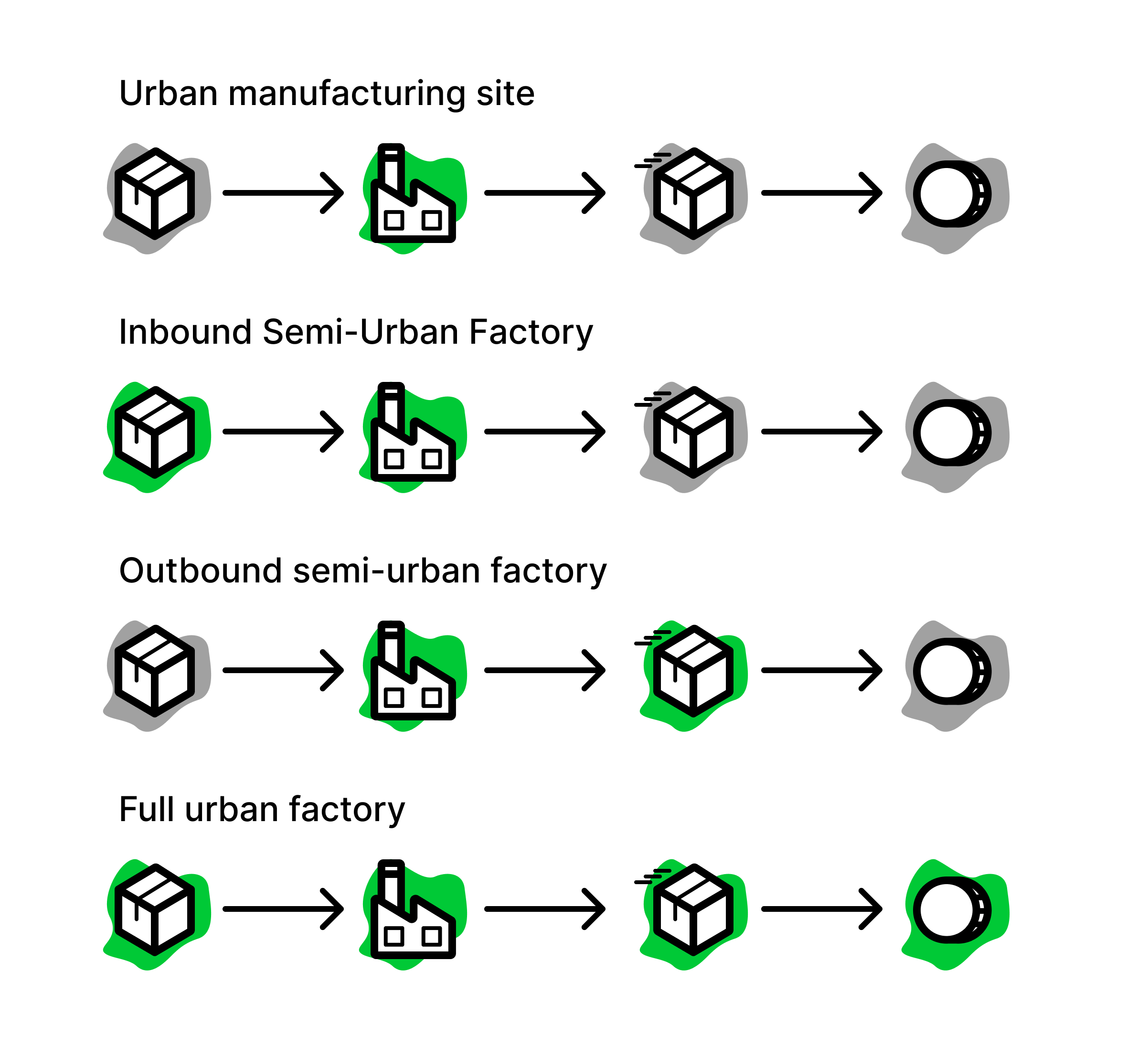
Different categories of urban factories.

A more precise categorisation of urban factories can be delineated into four distinct categories:

1. Urban manufacturing site, defined as a factory that is integrated into the urban area, with both the raw materials and the finished goods coming from or going to outside the urban area. To provide a simplified example, a factory could be described as follows: it takes the raw materials from a global source or one that is different from a local one, produces the goods locally, sends out the goods to a distribution system in another place and sells them in a third place.
2. Inbound Semi-Urban Factory, is integrated within the urban area, with the source materials being sourced from the same region. However, the output goods are shipped to another global region. To illustrate this concept, consider a factory that: utilises local materials, produces goods within the same area, dispatches goods to a distribution system located outside the production site, and sells the goods to a different market;
3. Outbound semi-urban factory, defined by the integration of the industrial facility within the urban landscape, with the objective of facilitating the distribution of manufactured goods within the immediate vicinity. To illustrate this concept, consider a factory that sources raw materials from international markets, conducts its manufacturing operations within the local area, and subsequently distributes and sells its products within the same geographical area;
4. Full urban factory, refers to a manufacturing facility in which all production processes take place within the urban area in which the production centre is located. This is the ideal urban factory.

== Integration in the city ==
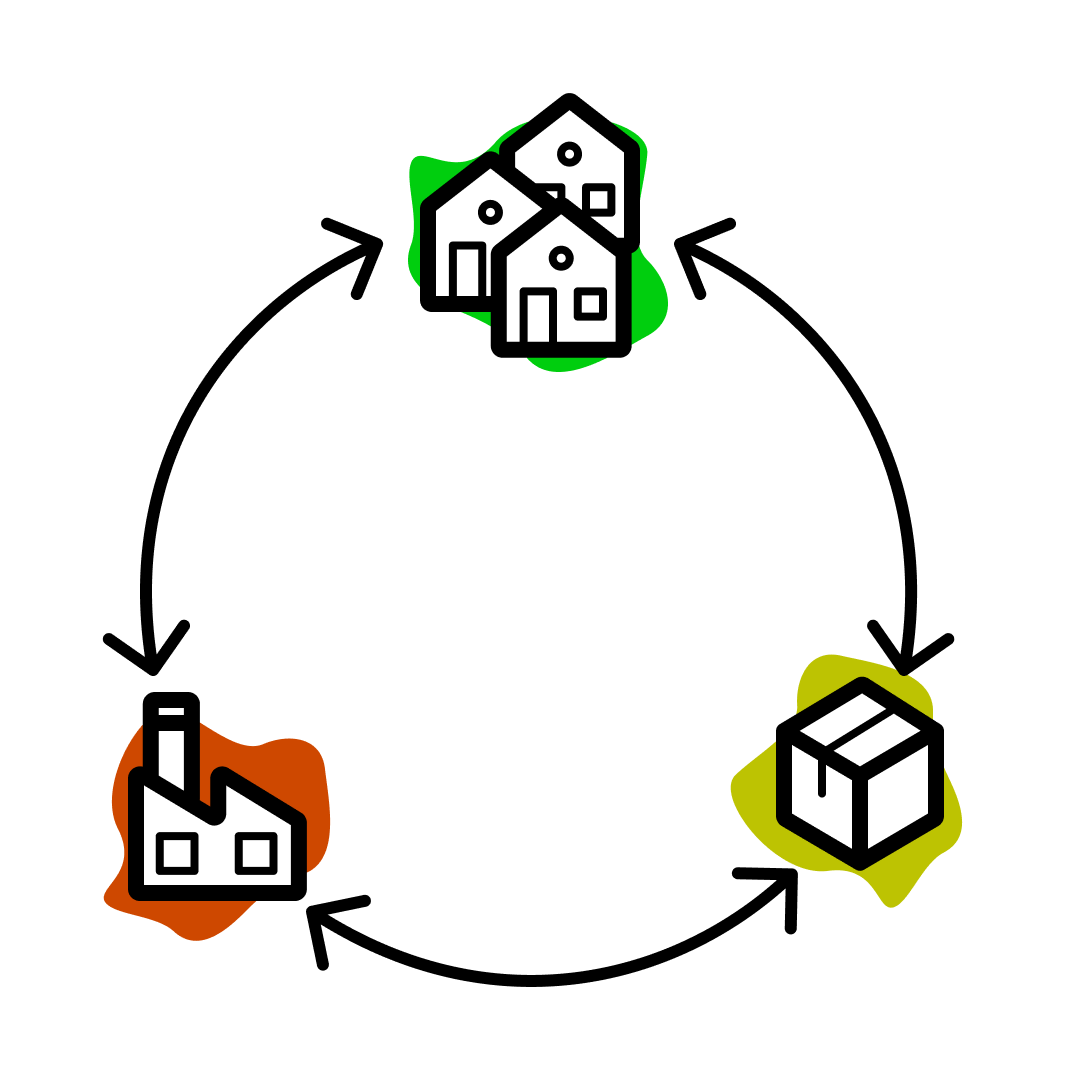
Intersection between urban manufacturing, urban area and products. Data source Fig. 15.1

The integration of urban manufacturing within a city necessitates the consideration of the relationship to the existing urban environment. This particular aspect is characterised by its capacity to facilitate diverse opportunities for the development of urban spaces. Historically, factories have been a source of concern for individuals living in proximity to such facilities, particularly with regard to noise and environmental pollution. The contemporary model of such factories is characterised by an integrated development that is planned from the perspective of the city and its inhabitants, as well as the products that are manufactured. This paradigm is intended to offer advantages to all the actors involved, and is referred to as the city-factory-system.

These new production facilities have sparked growing interest in urban planning. A multitude of projects have been initiated in various European cities with the objective of promoting the establishment of such advanced manufacturing facilities. A prominent example is the Cities of Making initiative, which is operational in cities such as London, Rotterdam and Brussels. This initiative undertakes a comprehensive exploration of the integration of cutting-edge technologies and the paradigm of urban manufacturing within urban centres. A further project, STEAMhouse, has transformed an old factory into a new facility providing facilities for businesses, artists and academics by creating an urban manufacturing and innovation hub.

A further case study is that of Barcelona, which initiated a project in 2014 with the aim of achieving self-sufficiency in terms of the production of all the products consumed by its citizens by 2054. This project is associated with the Fab City Global Initiative, which is part of the Fab Foundation. Since 2011, this initiative has sought to establish a community of makers, civic leaders, urbanists and innovators. The overarching objective is to reinvent urban areas into sustainable places that promote circularity.

== Academic projects ==
There are different research projects that have been funded on the theme of urban manufacturing specifically in Europe, examples are Cities of making and Urban manufacturing.

The Cities of Making project examines how cities can revitalise their manufacturing sectors through strategic research. The project conducted case studies in Brussels, London, and Rotterdam, each with a distinct industrial heritage, the project tests these solutions in real-world settings. The project's practical guidelines and resources for public service professionals are designed to position them at the centre of re industrialisation efforts, with the aim of fostering sustainable and resilient manufacturing sectors that benefit economically vulnerable groups while promoting environmental sustainability.

The Urban manufacturing project is dedicated to the growth and sustainability of collaborative makerspaces across Europe. The overarching objective of the project is to ensure the thriving of these spaces by identifying best practices, testing policy approaches, and advocating for receptive conditions in cities and regions. The project aims to establish a European network of advocates committed to this cause by demonstrating the transformative impact of cooperative facilities on innovation.

== See also ==
- Makerspaces
- Fab lab
- Smart manufacturing
- Fab Lab Barcelona

== Further readings ==
- "Spotlight: Urban manufacturing".
- "Urban Manufacturing Glossary: Key Terms & Definitions". 15 January 2025.
- "State of Urban Manufacturing. Understanding the industrial ecosystem in six U.S. Cities".
- Juraschek, Max; Bucherer, Michael; Schnabel, Fabian; Hoffschröer, Holger; Vossen, Benjamin; Kreuz, Felix; Thiede, Sebastian; Herrmann, Christoph (2018). "Urban Factories and Their Potential Contribution to the Sustainable Development of Cities". Procedia CIRP. 69: 72–77. doi:10.1016/j.procir.2017.11.067.
- Manzini, Ezio (2011). "The New Way of the Future: Small, Local, Open and Connected". Lien Centre.
- "Circular economy: definition, importance and benefits". Topics: European Parliament. 24 May 2023.
