= De WAR =

Social centre for arts and citizen science

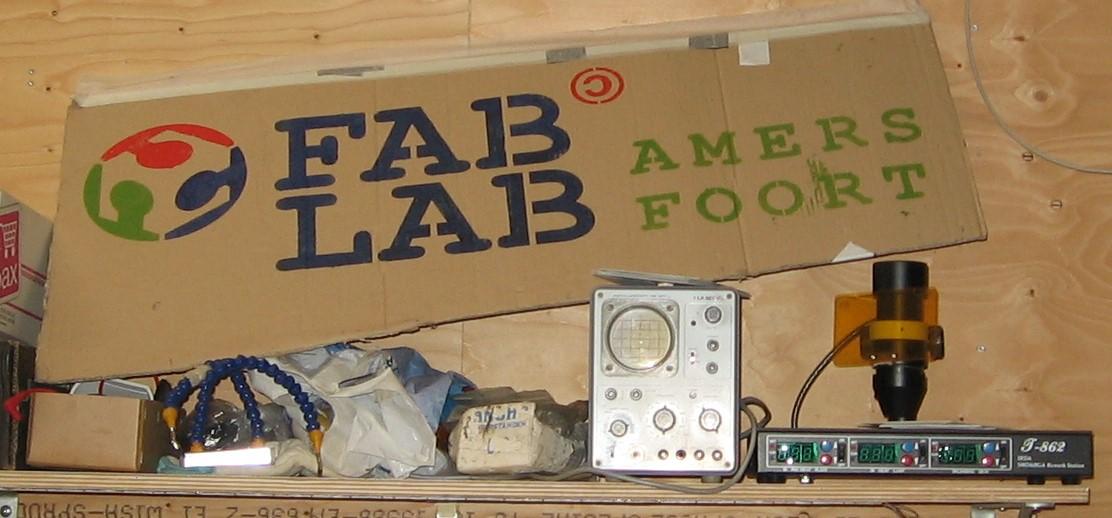

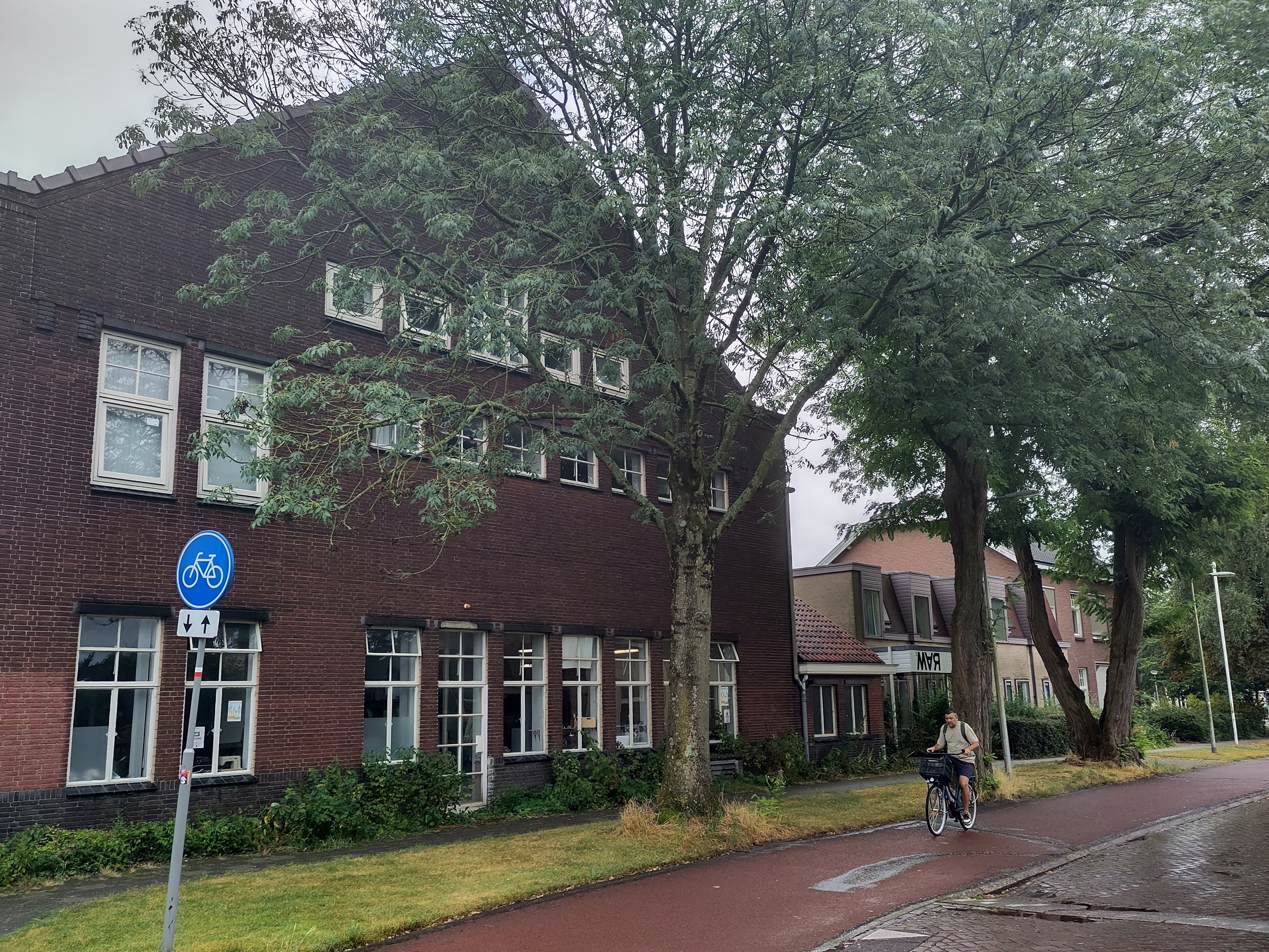
- FabLab Amersfoort logo and De WAR building complex, former Prins Willem III barracks, Heiligenbergerweg, Amersfoort, the Netherlands, 2024
- Formation: 2002, FabLab Amersfoort since 2010
- Founder: Diana Wildschut, Harmen Zijp
- Purpose: Free fab lab, incubator, showroom and platform for citizen science and other research, art, technology and sustainability
- Headquarters: Heiligenbergerweg 34, 3816 AK Amersfoort, the Netherlands
- Region served: The Netherlands
- Products: selfmade prototypes, equipment, works of art, workshops
- Services: annual conference Koppelting
- Fields: citizen science, arts, science and technology outreach, maker and hacker culture
- Official language: Dutch, English
- Website: www.dewar.nl

De WAR (Dutch for mess, chaos, confusion) is a social centre for the arts and citizen science, including a fab lab at Amersfoort, the Netherlands. A fab lab (fabrication laboratory) is a small-scale workshop offering (personal) digital fabrication. De WAR is a nonprofit volunteer organisation outside of Dutch academia and educational system, and is part of the Dutch maker and hacker culture scene. It organizes public events, exhibits and workshops connecting technology, sustainability, science and arts. FabLab Amersfoort opened within De WAR in 2010, as one of the first grassroots fab labs.

== History ==
De WAR dates back to 2002, when a group of performing artists, "De Spullenmannen" created a laboratory in an old factory complex in Amersfoort. Leading artists of the "De Spullenmannen" (English: The Spullenmen; the Dutch "spullen" meaning "things" or "stuff") were Diana Wildschut and Harmen Zijp. They make visual theatre and theatrical installations, and work often with garbage from the consumer society. The Spullenmen act on the interface of art and science. The Spullen laboratory ("Spullenlab") was established in the abandoned factory of Warner-Jenkinson (part of Sensient Technologies), where dyes were made.

Around 2007 the first steps in creating "De WAR" were taken. The idea was to create an open workspace for artists, (citizen) scientists, starting entrepreneurs etc. An important factor in the foundation of De WAR was the start of the so-called "festival Franje", ("Franje" meaning "fringe"), that continued as an autonomous fringe festival in Amersfoort, Arendal (Norway) and Potsdam (Germany) until 2017.

== Gallery ==
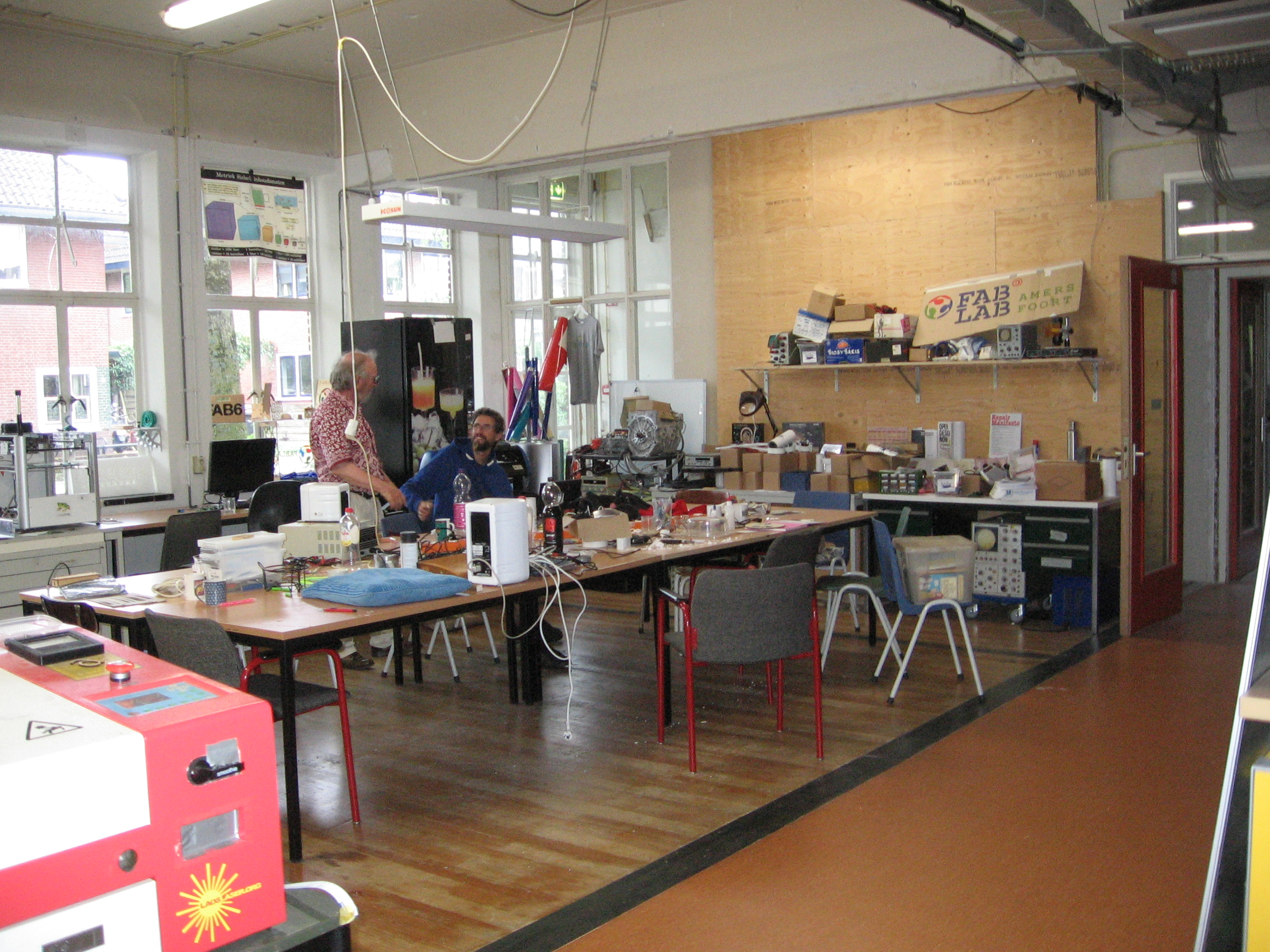
De WAR Fab lab, 2024.

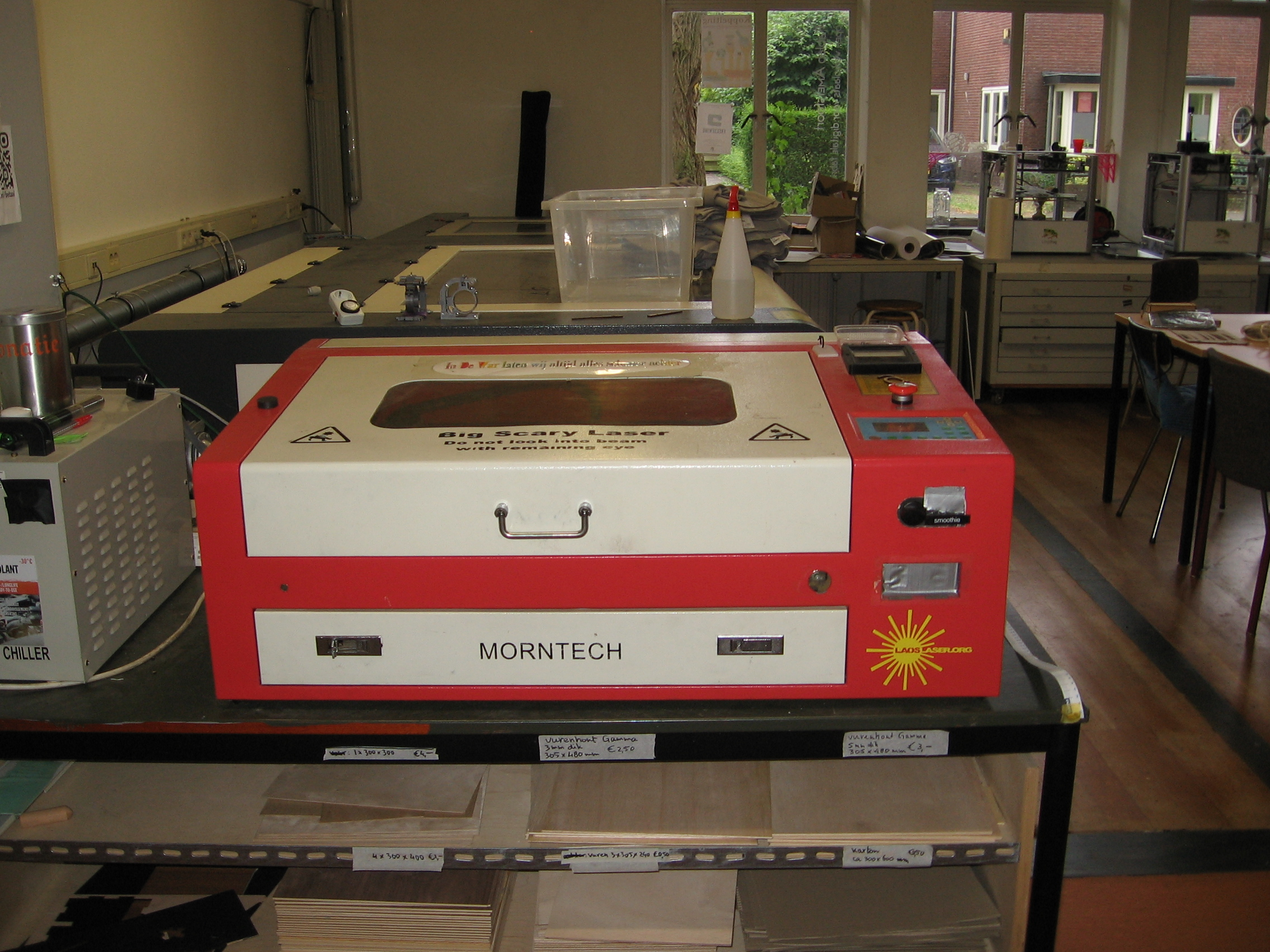
De WAR Fab lab equipment, 2024.

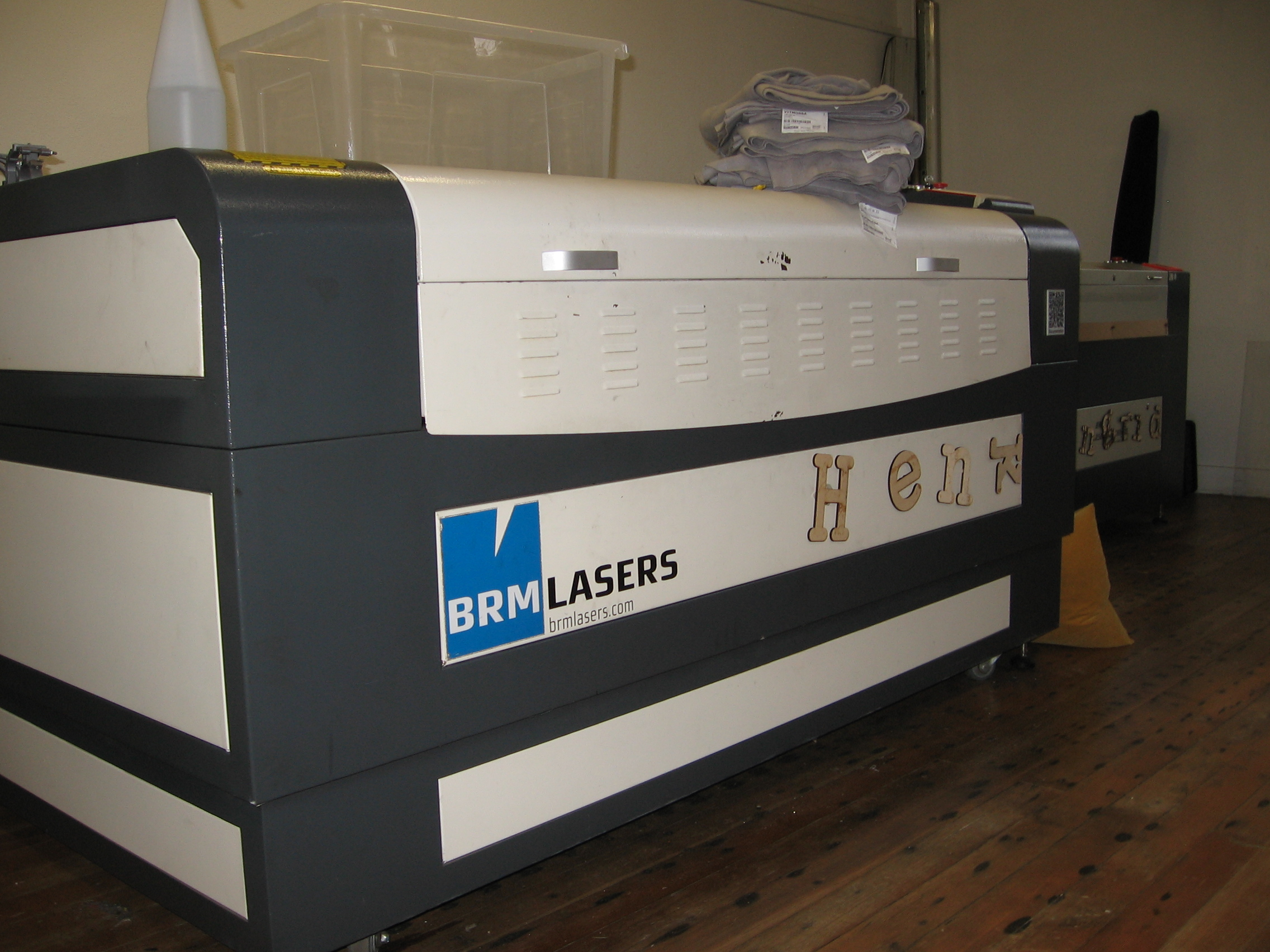
De WAR Fab lab equipment, 2024.

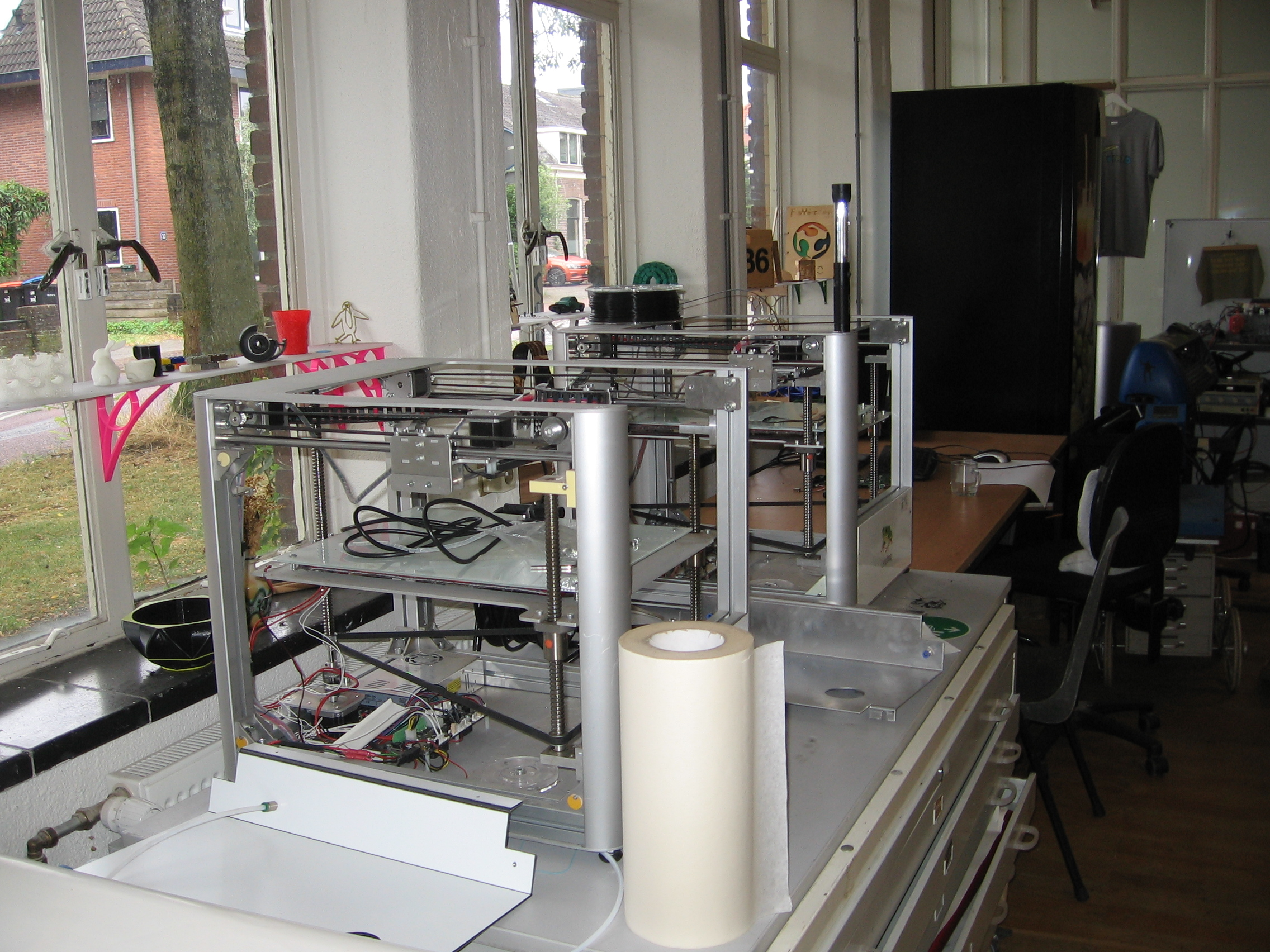
De WAR Fab lab equipment, 2024.

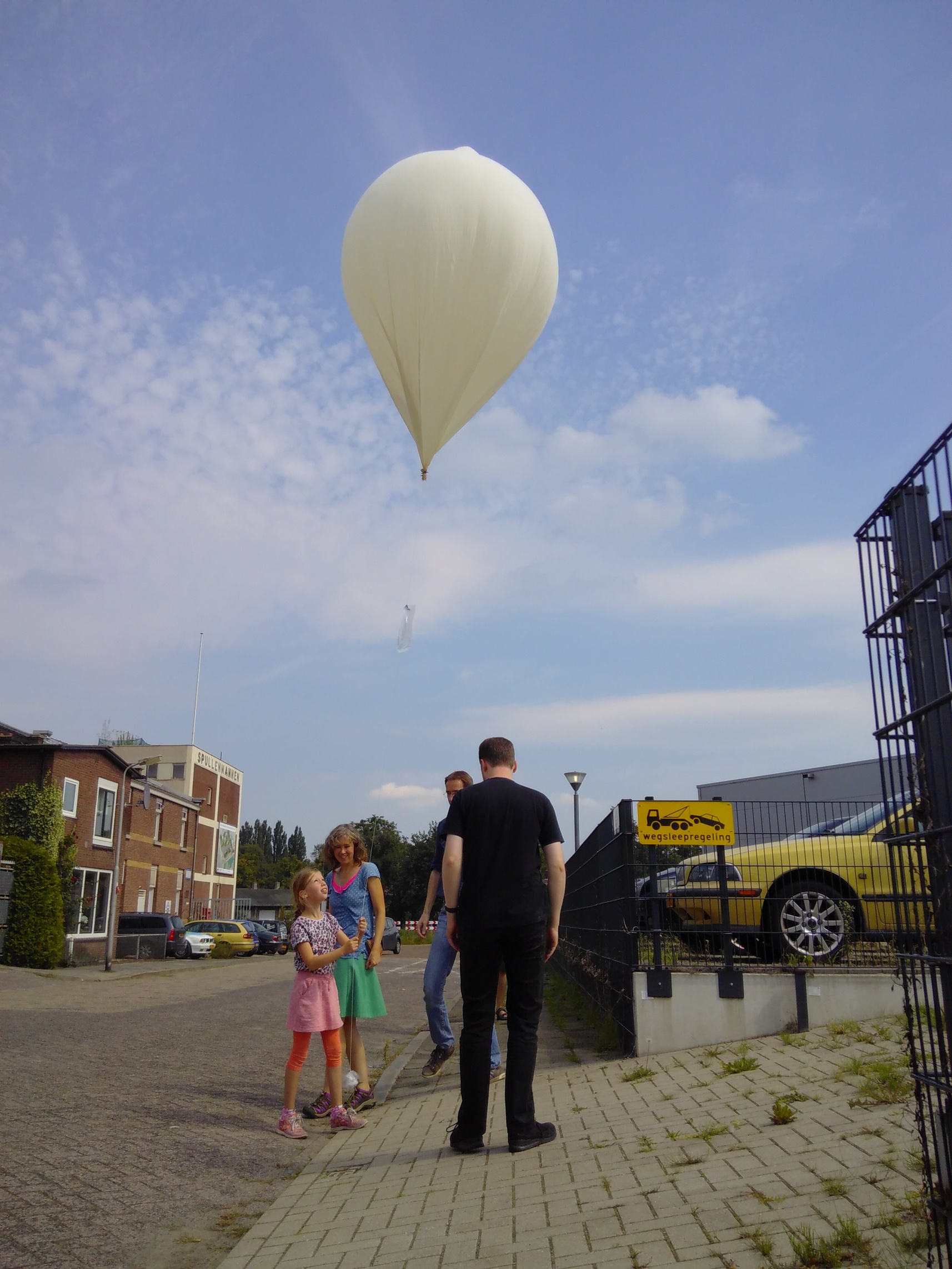
Citizen science: Weather balloon launch, De WAR, 2017.

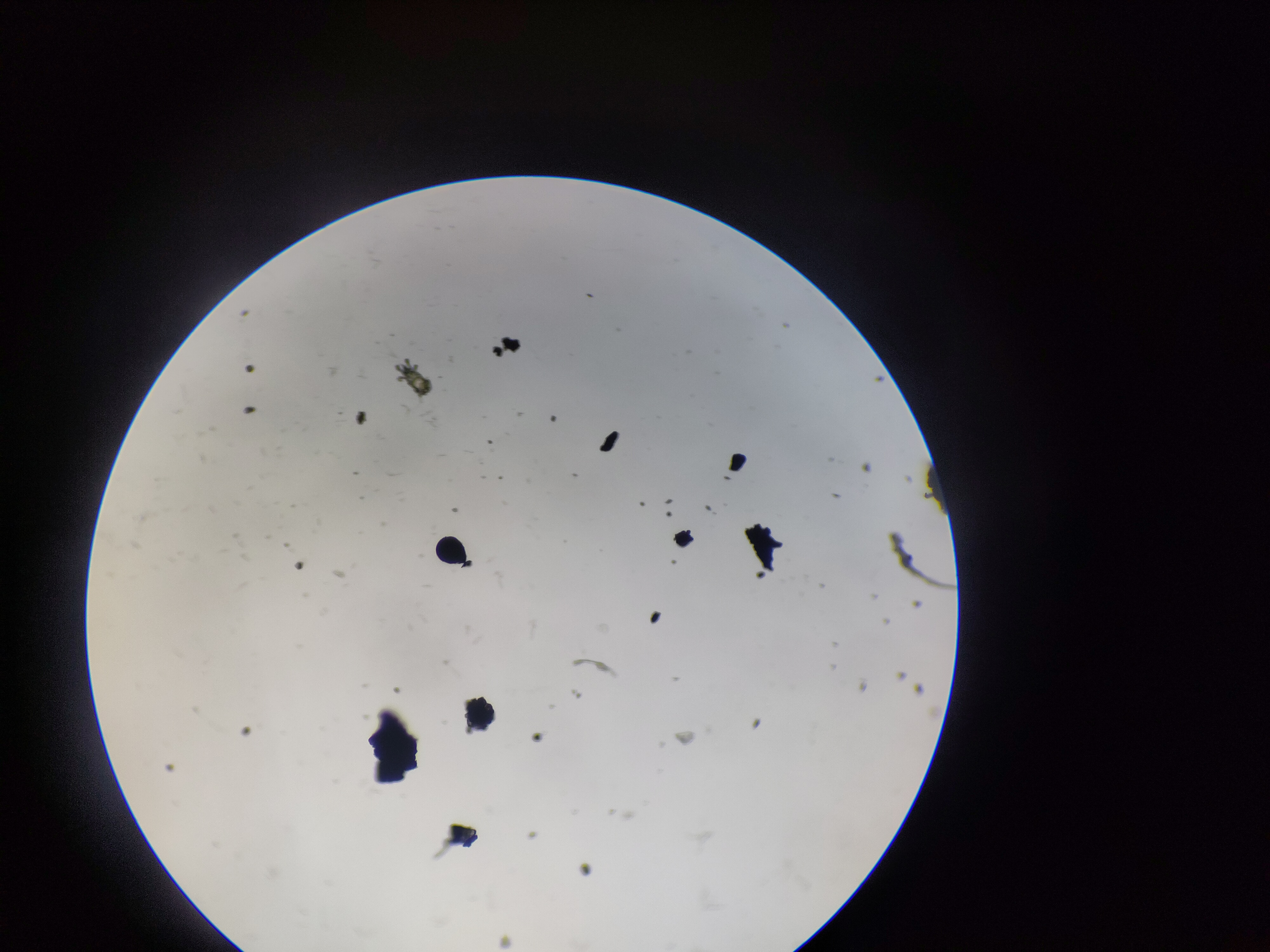
Citizen science: Microscope view of a metallic micrometeorite (pointed eggshape) including a dust mite, De WAR, 2024.

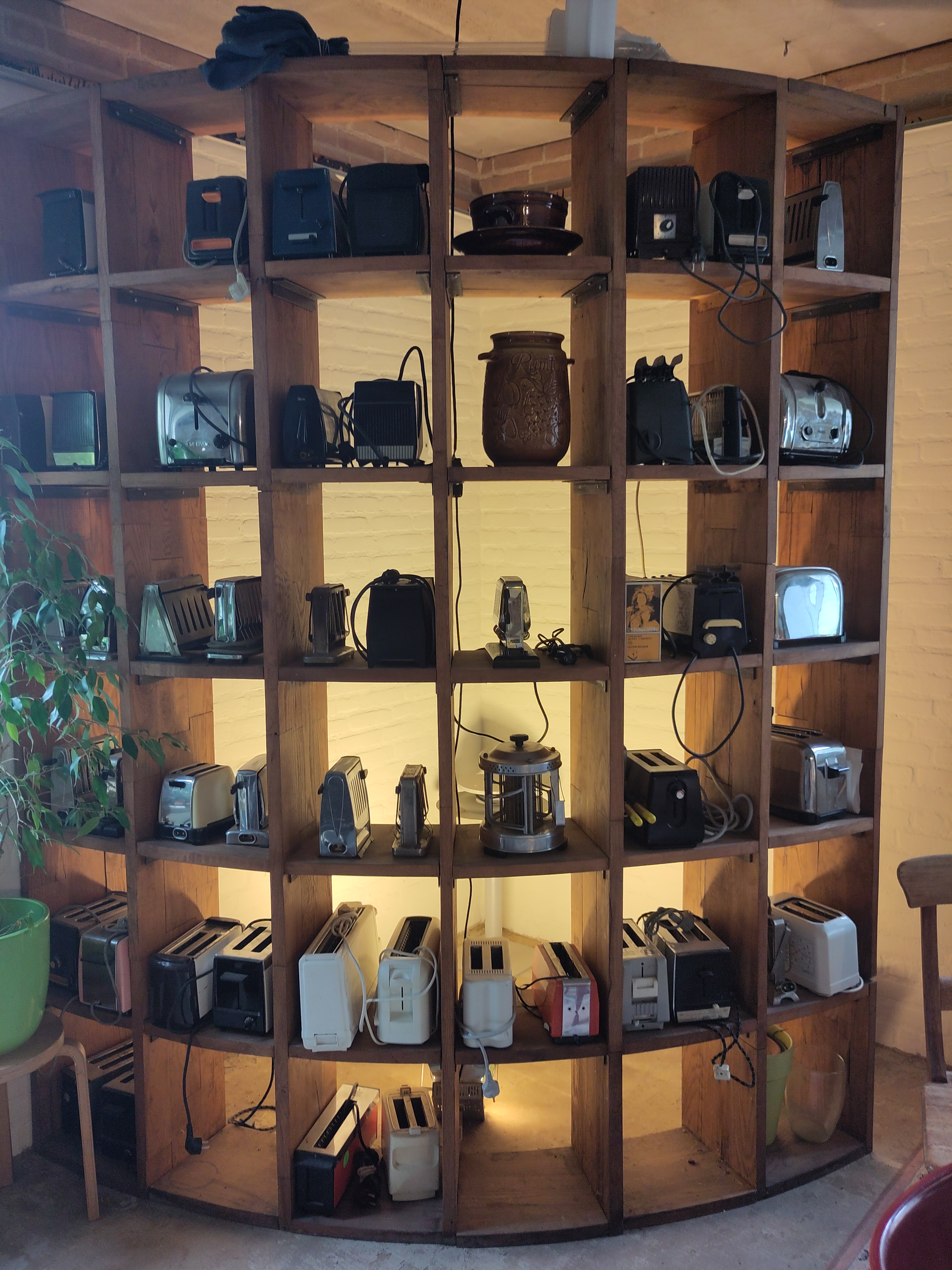
Showcase for discarded domestic electrical appliances (toasters) at De WAR, 2024.

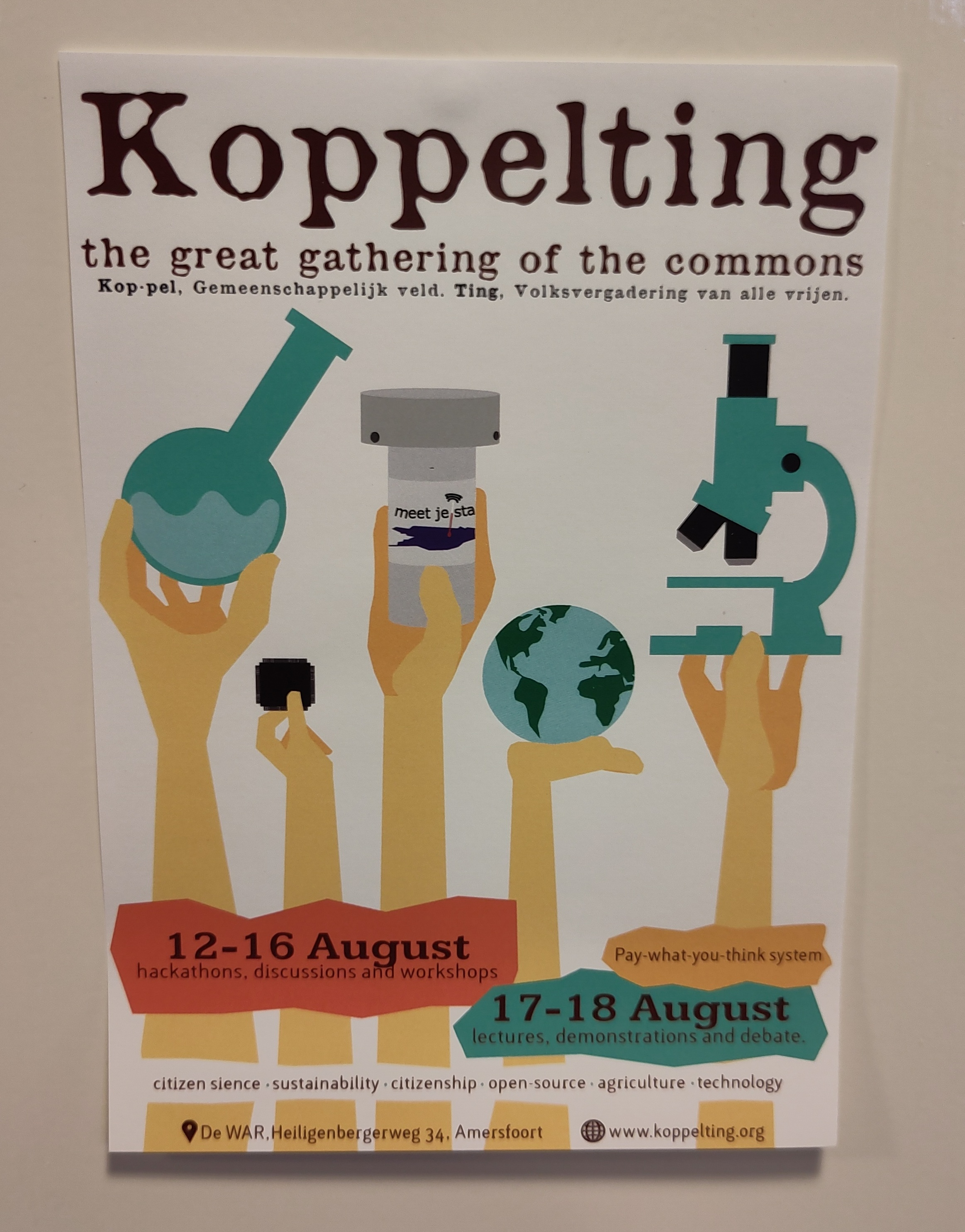
Poster for the Koppelting Citizen science conference, August 2024.

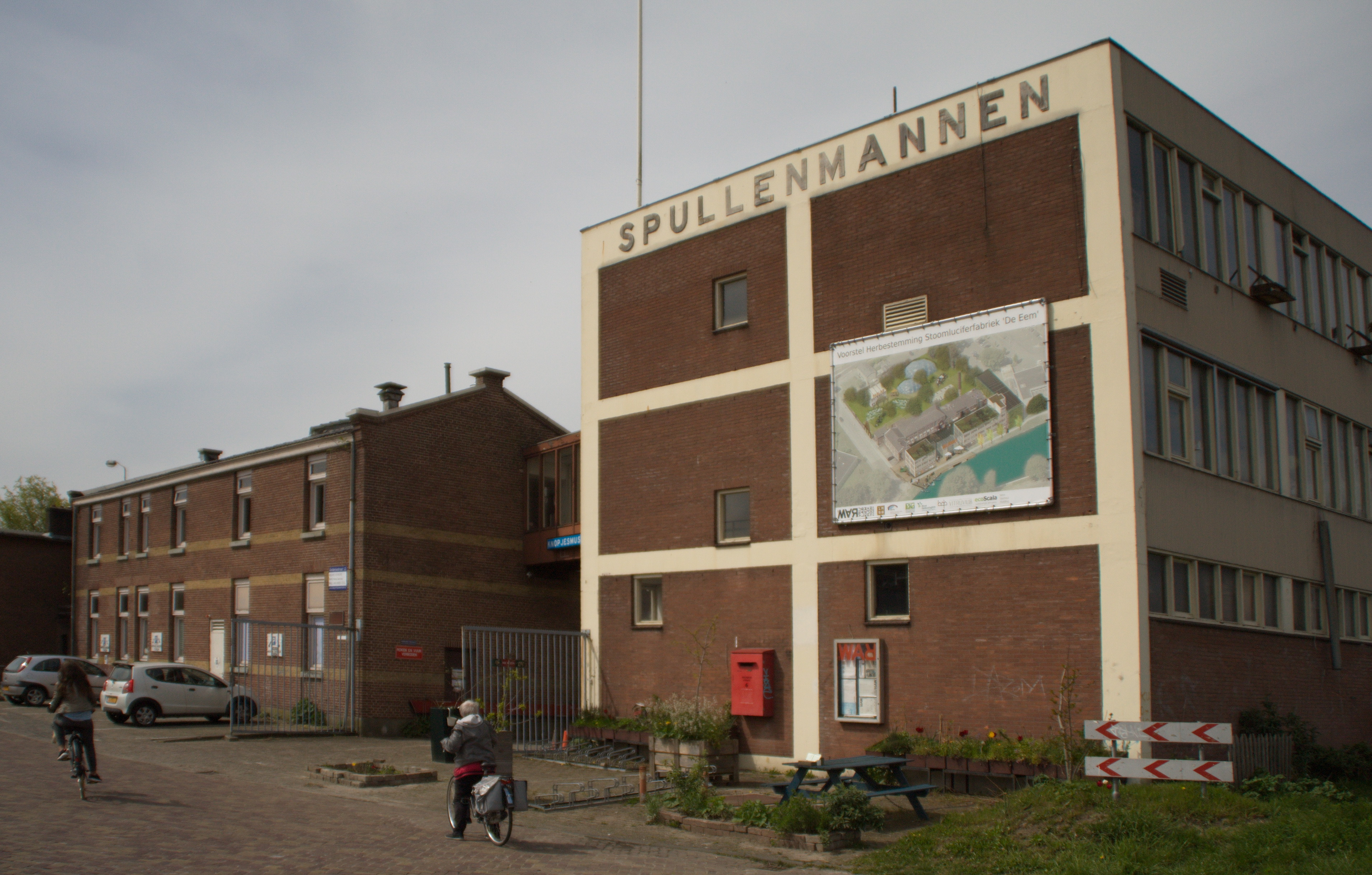
Former location of De WAR, former Steam Match Factory, Eem River, Amersfoort, the Netherlands, 2016.

== Literature ==
- Smith A, Fressoli M, Abrol D, Arond E, Ely A (2017). Grassroots innovation movements. Pathways to sustainability. Abingdon, Oxon: Routledge. pp. 113–115. ISBN 978-1-138-90122-3. OCLC 912378783. Full text download.
- Troxler, Peter (2014). "Fab Labs forked: A grassroots insurgency inside the next industrial revolution". Journal of Peer production. 5: 1–3.
- Wildschut, Diana (2017). "The need for citizen science in the transition to a sustainable peer-to-peer-society". Futures. 91: 46–52. doi:10.1016/j.futures.2016.11.010.
- Zijp, H. (2011). "The grass roots FabLab instructable or How to set up a Fab Lab in 7 days with 4 people and about EUR 5000" (PDF). Fab Lab Amersfoort, the Netherlands.
