= The Promised Land (radio program) =

- Genre: Environmental, Leadership
- Running time: 1 hour
- Country of origin: United States
- Language(s): English
- Home station: Minnesota Public Radio (KSJN)
- Syndicates: American Public Media
- Starring: Majora Carter
- Produced by: Marge Ostroushko
- Original release: 2009–2011 – present
- Website: www.thepromisedland.org
- Podcast

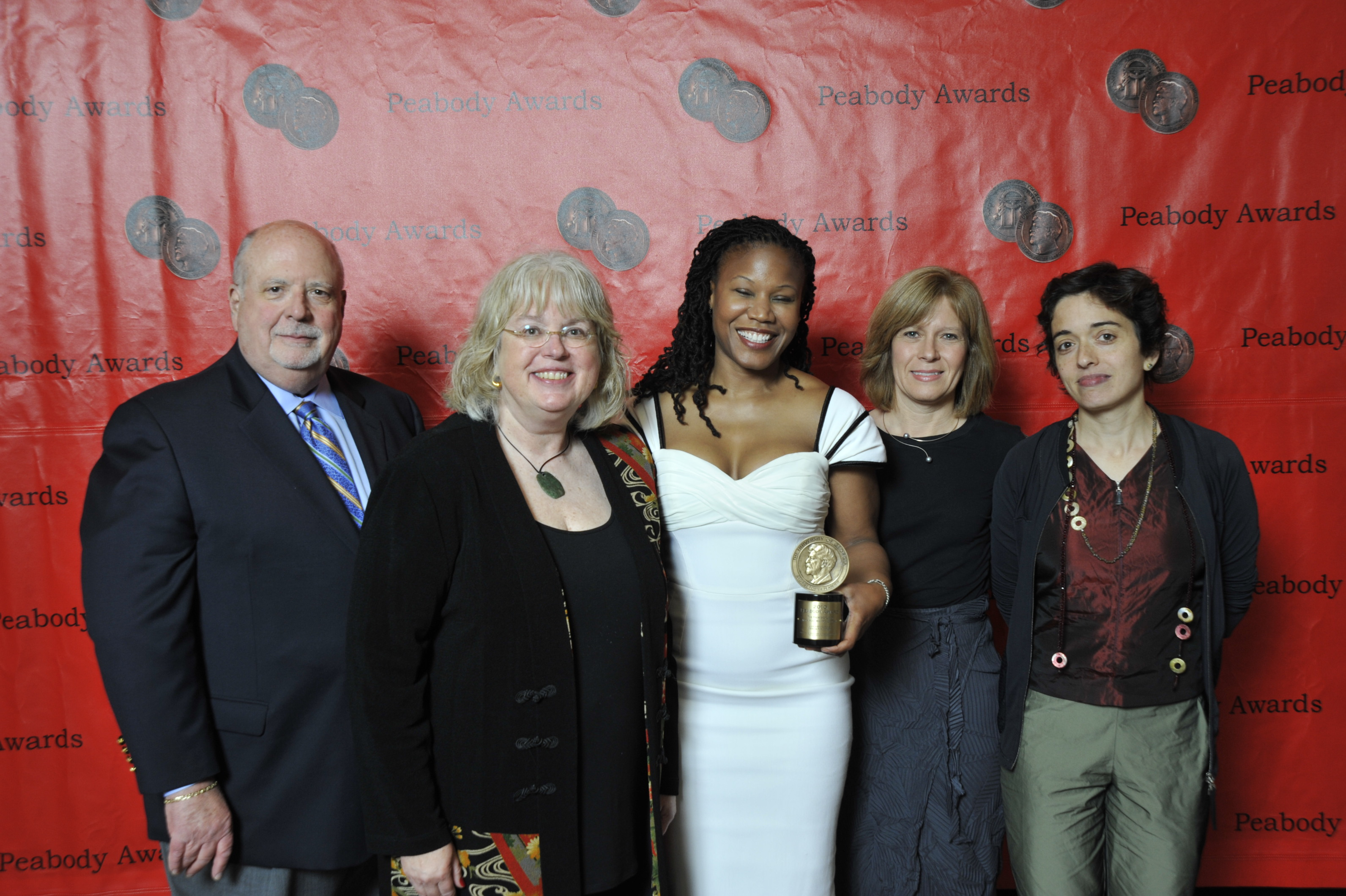
A Peabody Award for The Promised Land. L to R: Fred Young (juror), Marge Ostroushko, Majora Carter, Mary Beth Kircher and Emily Botein, 2011

The Promised Land was a public radio program created and hosted by Majora Carter. It was produced by Launch Productions and distributed by American Public Media, and was most often heard on public radio stations in the United States.

In 2008, Majora Carter and Marge Ostroushko co-produced the pilot episode of The Promised Land, which won a 3-way competition for a Corporation for Public Broadcasting Talent Quest <<link:0>>. The one-hour programs debuted on over 150 public radio stations across the US on January 19, 2009, and has since earned a 2010 Peabody Award.

== Guests have included ==
Season 1: Nalini Nadkarni, Audrey and Frank Peterman, Brenda Palms Barber, John Francis (environmentalist), Winona LaDuke.

Season 2: Kyshun Webster, Nat Turner, Wilma Subra, Vietnamese Fisherfolk, Sharon Hanshaw.
