= Institute for Advanced Architecture of Catalonia =

Institute for Advanced Architecture of Catalonia (IAAC)
- Institut d'Arquitectura Avançada de Catalunya
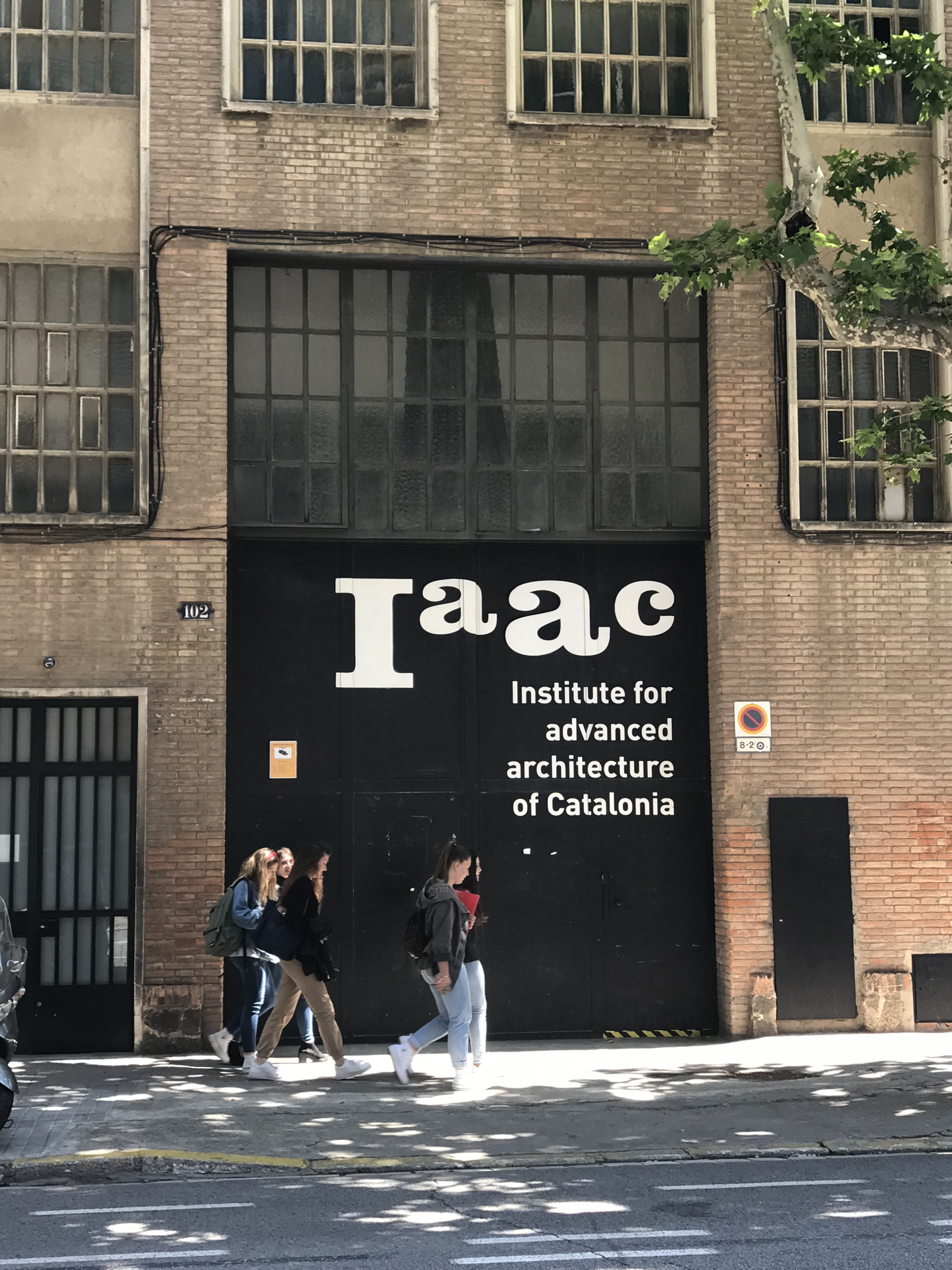
- Type: Public
- Location: Barcelona, Spain
- Website: Institute for Advanced Architecture of Catalonia

The Institute for Advanced Architecture of Catalonia (Catalan: Institut d'Arquitectura Avançada de Catalunya, IAAC; IPA: [instiˈtud dəɾkitəkˈtuɾə əβənˈsaðə ðə kətəˈluɲə]) also known as IAAC, is an educational and research centre.

Based in the 22@ district of Barcelona, one of the world’s capitals of architecture and urbanism, IAAC is a platform for the exchange of knowledge with faculty and students from over 40 countries, including United States, China, India, Poland, Italy, Norway, Mexico and Sudan. Students work simultaneously on multiple scales (city, building, manufacturing) and in different areas of expertise (ecology, energy, digital manufacturing, new technologies), pursuing their own lines of enquiry on the way to developing an integrated set of skills with which to act effectively in their home country or globally.

IAAC has carried out research projects in Brazil, Taiwan, Croatia and Romania. In 2008 it was chosen to take part in the official section of the Venice Biennale with the project Hyperhabitat and in 2010 it presented a 1:1 scale house at the Solar Decathlon Europe in Madrid where it won the Peoples Choice Award has the most advanced digital production laboratory of any educational institution in southern Europe, with laser cutters, 3D printers, milling machines and a platform for manufacturing chips. IAAC also designed the first 3D printed bridge in the world in collaboration with Acciona, which was built in Alcobendas (Spain) in 2016.

IAAC offers a wide range of educational programmes in the field of advanced architecture, ecological buildings, city and technology, robotics and advanced construction, and design for emergent futures which are accredited by the UPC Polytechnic University.

The Institute includes in its organization the research centre for self-sufficiency Valldaura Labs and the digital fabrication laboratory Fab Lab Barcelona, which is part of the global network of Fab Labs affiliated to MIT’s Center for Bit and Atoms.

== Objectives ==
The main objective of the Institute for Advanced Architecture of Catalonia is to stimulate, promote and develop research on the diverse areas of advanced architecture promoting the development of knowledge in architecture and its interaction with other disciplines.
