= Fab Lab Barcelona =

Fabrication workshop in Barcelona, Spain

Coordinates: 41°23′48.17″N 2°11′39.51″E

Fab Lab Barcelona (Fab Lab BCN) is a laboratory for digital fabrication and part of the global Fab Labs network. It was established in 2007 as the first Fab Lab in the European Union. The lab was founded by the Institute for Advanced Architecture of Catalonia (IAAC).

Located in the El Poblenou district of Barcelona, the facility occupies a former industrial building that has been adapted for research, education, and production activities. Fab Lab Barcelona is part of an international network of fabrication laboratories that share knowledge, tools, and practices related to digital fabrication and maker culture.

The lab has been involved in various projects integrating digital fabrication with education, community participation, and research. Notable initiatives associated with Fab Lab Barcelona include the Smart Citizen environmental sensing platform and the Distributed Design platform, which connects European designers and makers who work on alternatives to mass production.

== Prizes and awards ==
- The Remix El Barrio project won the STARTS Grand Prize by the European Commission for the most Innovative Collaboration in 2021.
- The Distributed Design platform led by Fab Lab Barcelona is an official member of the New European Bauhaus initiative in 2020.
- The Making Sense Toolkit co-developed as part of the [Making Sense] project received a STARTS Prize honourable mention in 2018.
- Recognized by the Financial Times, Google and leading European policymakers as one of 100 digital pioneers in Europe in 2017.
- The Smart Citizen project won Most Innovative Initiative prize at Smart City Expo World Congress 2013.

== See also ==
- Fab lab
- Urban manufacturing
