= Smart manufacturing =

Broad category of manufacturing

Smart manufacturing is a broad category of manufacturing that employs computer-integrated manufacturing, high levels of adaptability and rapid design changes, digital information technology, and more flexible technical workforce training. Other goals sometimes include fast changes in production levels based on demand, optimization of the supply chain, efficient production and recyclability. In this concept, a smart factory has interoperable systems, multi-scale dynamic modelling and simulation, intelligent automation, strong cyber security, and networked sensors.

The broad definition of smart manufacturing covers many different technologies. Some of the key technologies in the smart manufacturing movement include big data processing capabilities, industrial connectivity devices and services, and advanced robotics.

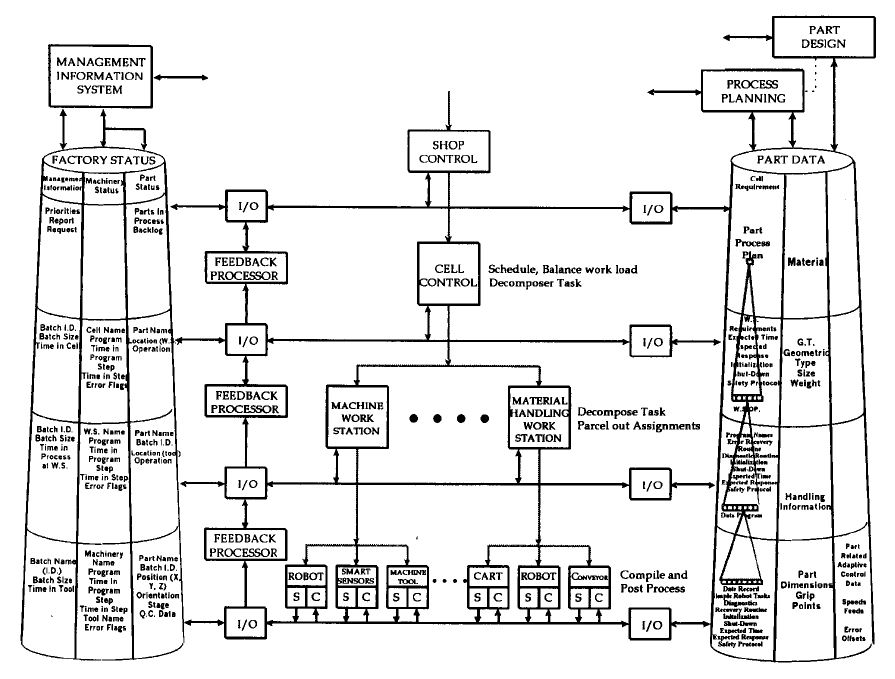
Graphic of a sample manufacturing control system showing the interconnectivity of data analysis, computing and automation. Graphic of a sample manufacturing control system showing the interconnectivity of data analysis, computing and automation

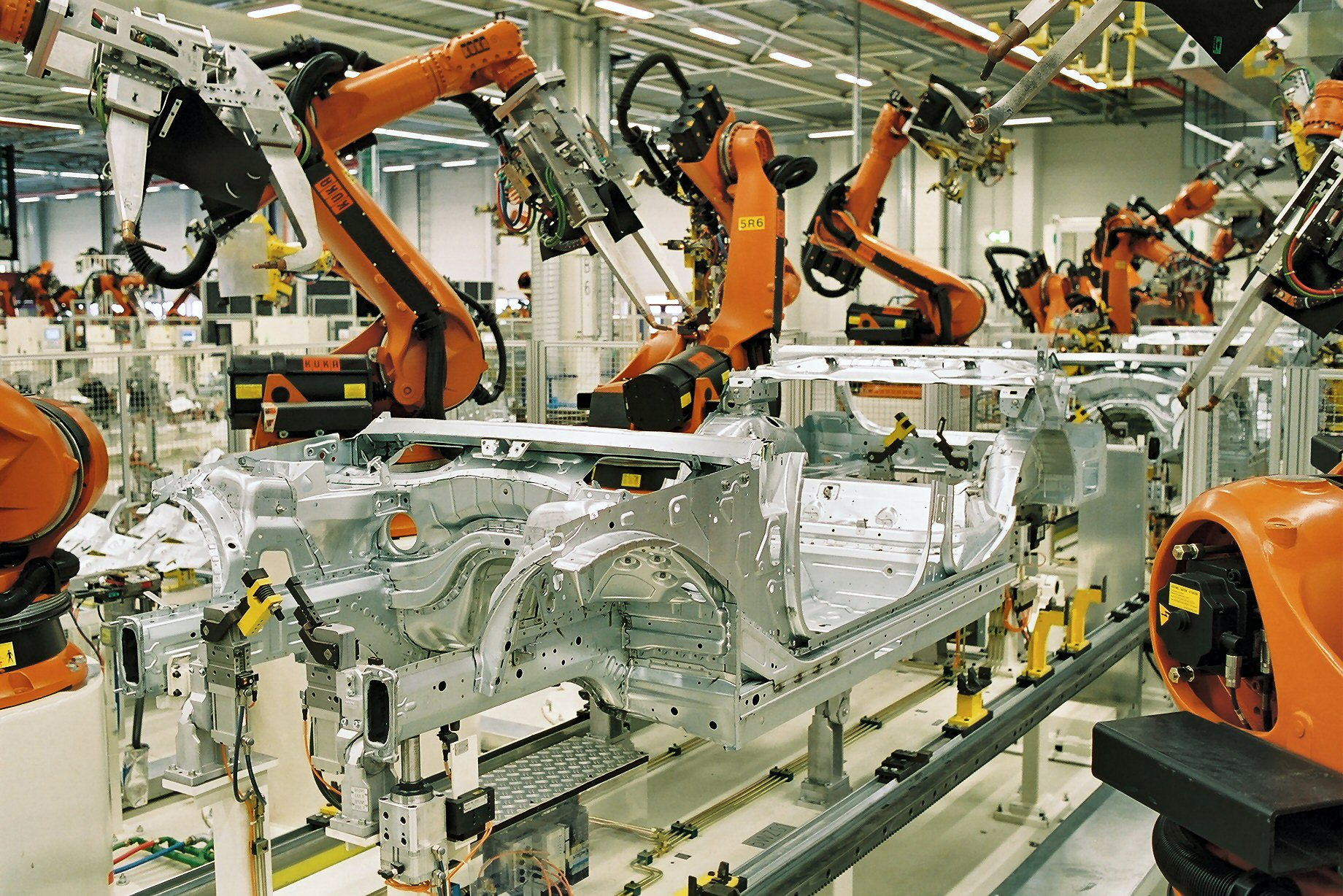
Advanced robotics used in automotive production

== Big data processing ==
Smart manufacturing leverages big data analytics to optimize complex production processes and enhance supply chain management. Big data analytics refers to a method for gathering and understanding large data sets in terms of what are known as the three V's, velocity, variety and volume. Velocity informs the frequency of data acquisition, which can be concurrent with the application of previous data. Variety describes the different types of data that may be handled. Volume represents the amount of data. Big data analytics allows an enterprise to use smart manufacturing to predict demand and the need for design changes rather than reacting to orders placed.

Some products have embedded sensors, which produce large amounts of data that can be used to understand consumer behavior and improve future versions of the product.

=== Supply Chain Autonomy ===
One projected valuable element of big data processing is the introduction of and the ongoing progression to full supply chain autonomy. Supply chain autonomy is an emerging concept in operations and logistics that describes supply chains capable of functioning independently, with minimal to no human input, by leveraging data. Autonomous supply chains (ASCs) may be defined as systems that can self-manage across various functions, including planning, coordination, and execution, and the degree and inclusion of autonomy across these vectors defines the progression towards full autonomy.

These systems rely on technologies such as digital twins, AI-driven agents, and real-time data to achieve three core capabilities: self-configuration (adjusting operations dynamically), self-optimisation (continuously improving performance), and self-healing (responding to disruptions without manual intervention). Conceptual frameworks exist that illustrate how these elements interact—through sensing, processing, decision-making, and learning loops—to enable end-to-end autonomy, which can provide a foundation for understanding how future supply chains can be made more resilient, efficient, and adaptive in complex and volatile environments.

Digital twins across multi-vendor networks increasingly rely on federated digital thread architectures to maintain end-to-end data traceability and consistency. Because participants in the supply chain operate on disparate software platforms, using a federated approach links design specifications and maintenance records via open standards without requiring full data centralization or exposing proprietary intellectual property. This continuous data flow supports functional safety and quality compliance standards, throughout an asset's operational lifespan.

== Advanced robotics ==
Advanced industrial robots, also known as smart machines, operate autonomously and can communicate directly with manufacturing systems. In some advanced manufacturing contexts, they can work with humans for co-assembly tasks. By evaluating sensory input and distinguishing between different product configurations, these machines are able to solve problems and make decisions independent of people. These robots are able to complete work beyond what they were initially programmed to do and have artificial intelligence that allows them to learn from experience. These machines have the flexibility to be reconfigured and re-purposed. This gives them the ability to respond rapidly to design changes and innovation, which is a competitive advantage over more traditional manufacturing processes. An area of concern surrounding advanced robotics is the safety and well-being of the human workers who interact with robotic systems. Traditionally, measures have been taken to segregate robots from the human workforce, but advances in robotic cognitive ability have opened up opportunities, such as cobots, for robots to work collaboratively with people.

Cloud computing allows large amounts of data storage or computational power to be rapidly applied to manufacturing, and allow a large amount of data on machine performance and output quality to be collected. This can improve machine configuration, predictive maintenance, and fault analysis. Better predictions can facilitate better strategies for ordering raw materials or scheduling production runs.

== 3D printing ==
As of 2019, 3D printing is mainly used in rapid prototyping, design iteration, and small-scale production. Improvements in speed, quality, and materials could make it useful in mass production and mass customization.

== Eliminating workplace inefficiencies and hazards ==
Smart manufacturing can also be attributed to surveying workplace inefficiencies and assisting in worker safety. Efficiency optimization is a huge focus for adopters of "smart" systems, which is done through data research and intelligent learning automation. For instance operators can be given personal access cards with inbuilt Wi-Fi and Bluetooth, which can connect to the machines and a Cloud platform to determine which operator is working on which machine in real time. An intelligent, interconnected 'smart' system can be established to set a performance target, determine if the target is obtainable, and identify inefficiencies through failed or delayed performance targets. In general, automation may alleviate inefficiencies due to human error. And in general, evolving AI eliminates the inefficiencies of its predecessors.

As robots take on more of the physical tasks of manufacturing, workers no longer need to be present and are exposed to fewer hazards.

== Impact of Industry 4.0 ==
Industry 4.0 is a project in the high-tech strategy of the German government that promotes the computerization of traditional industries such as manufacturing. The goal is the intelligent factory (Smart Factory) that is characterized by adaptability, resource efficiency, and ergonomics, as well as the integration of customers and business partners in business and value processes. Its technological foundation consists of cyber-physical systems and the Internet of Things.

This kind of "intelligent manufacturing" makes use of:

- Wireless connections, both during product assembly and long-distance interactions with them;
- Last generation sensors, distributed along the supply chain and the same products (Internet of things);
- Elaboration of a great amount of data to control all phases of construction, distribution and usage of a good.

European Roadmap "Factories of the Future" and German one "Industrie 4.0″ illustrate several of the action lines to undertake and the related benefits. Some examples are:

- Advanced manufacturing processes and rapid prototyping will make possible for each customer to order one-of-a-kind product without significant cost increase.
- Collaborative Virtual Factory (VF) platforms will drastically reduce cost and time associated to new product design and engineering of the production process, by exploiting complete simulation and virtual testing throughout the Product Lifecycle.
- Advanced Human-Machine interaction (HMI) and augmented reality (AR) devices will help increasing safety in production plants and reducing physical demand to workers (whose age has an increasing trend).
- Machine learning will be fundamental to optimize the production processes, both for reducing lead times and reducing the energy consumption.
- Cyber-physical systems and machine-to-machine (M2M) communication will allow to gather and share real-time data from the shop floor in order to reduce downtime and idle time by conducting extremely effective predictive maintenance.

== Statistics ==
The Ministry of Economy, Trade and Industry in South Korea announced on 10 March 2016 that it had aided the construction of smart factories in 1,240 small and medium enterprises, which it said resulted in an average 27.6% decrease in defective products, 7.1% faster production of prototypes, and 29.2% lower cost.

== See also ==
- Open manufacturing
- Fourth Industrial Revolution
- Urban manufacturing
