= Marge Ostroushko =

American radio producer

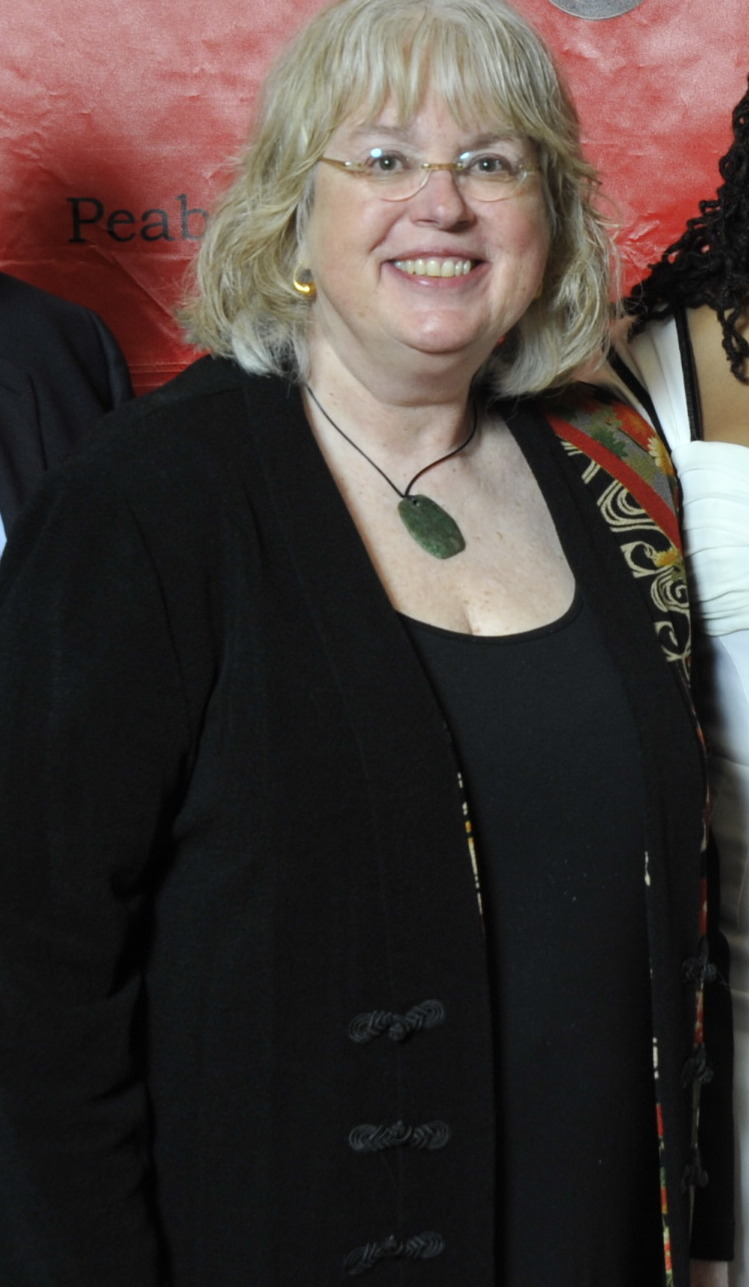

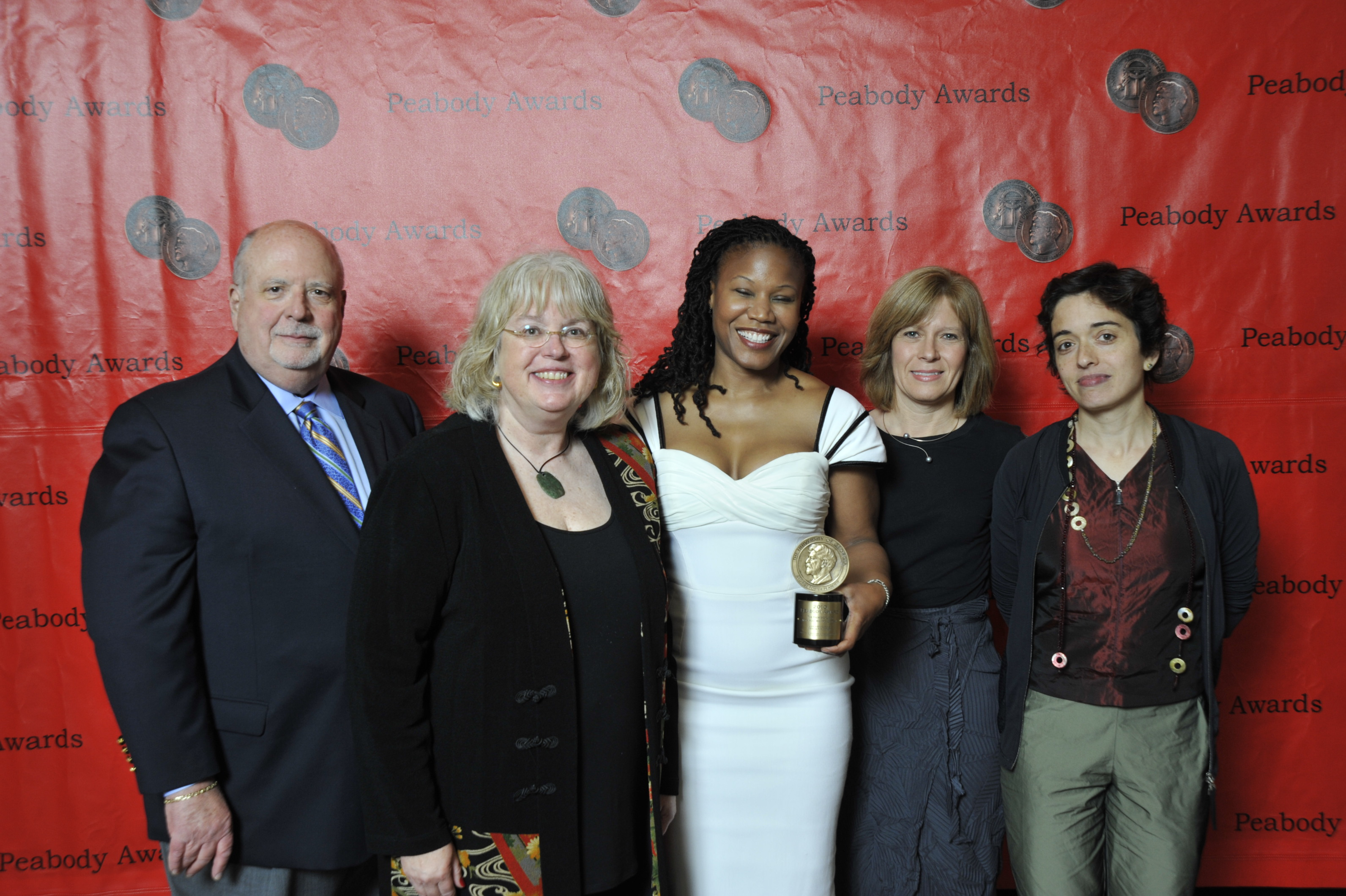
A Peabody Award for The Promised Land. L to R: Fred Young (juror), Marge Ostroushko, Majora Carter, Mary Beth Kircher and Emily Botein, 2011.

Marjorie "Marge" Ostroushko (born March 14, 1951) is a public radio producer.

== Early life ==
Ostroushko was born and raised in upstate New York. In 1973, she graduated from Wittenberg University with a Bachelor of Arts in East Asian Studies and Environmental Studies.

== Career ==
In 2001, Ostroushko co-created the public radio show Speaking of Faith. From 1977 to 1983, she was a producer at the public radio show A Prairie Home Companion hosted by Garrison Keillor. The show won a Peabody during her tenure. She has won two Peabody Awards as an executive producer, for Mississippi: River of Song and The Promised Land.

Ostroushko worked in new program development and marketing for Public Radio International for ten years. In 2008, she and Majora Carter co-produced the pilot episode of The Promised Land, which won a three-way competition for a Corporation for Public Broadcasting Talent Quest grant. The one-hour program debuted on over 150 public radio stations across the US on January 19, 2009, was renewed for the 2010/2011 season, and earned a 2010 Peabody Award.

Ostroushko is a partner of Launch Productions, a collaboration in national programming development.

== Personal life ==
Ostroushko was married to mandolin player Peter Ostroushko, who died in February 2021.
