= The Next Big Thing (radio series) =

Radio series

The Next Big Thing was a radio series produced at WNYC in New York City, and syndicated nationally in the U.S. by Public Radio International. It was offered nationally after the success of PRI's Chicago-based This American Life, which it somewhat resembles; one distinction is that TNBT is more likely to be given over to one documentary or radio drama segment per episode. This show is no longer airing on WNYC, where it began in 1999 and transmitted its last episode in January, 2006. Archives are still available on the WNYC website.
