= Fab lab =

Small-scale workshop for digital fabrication

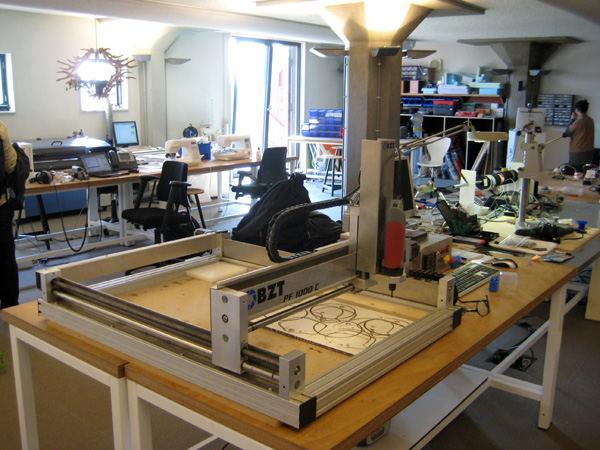
Amsterdam Fab Lab at The Waag Society, 2009.

A fab lab (fabrication laboratory) is a small-scale workshop offering (personal) digital fabrication.

A fab lab is typically equipped with an array of flexible computer-controlled tools that cover several different length scales and various materials, with the aim to make "almost anything". This includes prototyping and technology-enabled products generally perceived as limited to mass production.

While fab labs have yet to compete with mass production and its associated economies of scale in fabricating widely distributed products, they have already shown the potential to empower individuals to create smart devices for themselves. These devices can be tailored to local or personal needs in ways that are not practical or economical using mass production.

The fab lab movement is closely aligned with the DIY movement, open-source hardware, maker culture, and the free and open-source movement, and shares philosophy as well as technology with them.

== History ==
The fab lab program was initiated to broadly explore how the content of information relates to its physical representation and how an under-served community can be powered by technology at the grassroots level. The program began as a collaboration between the Grassroots Invention Group and the Center for Bits and Atoms at the MIT Media Lab in the Massachusetts Institute of Technology with a grant from the National Science Foundation (NSF, Washington, D.C.) in 2001.

Vigyan Ashram in India was the first fab lab to be set up outside MIT. It is established in 2002 and received capital equipment by NSF-USA and IIT Kanpur.

While the Grassroots Invention Group is no longer in the MIT Media Lab, The Center for Bits and Atoms consortium is still actively involved in continuing research in areas related to description and fabrication but does not operate or maintain any of the labs worldwide (with the excmobile fab lab). The fab lab concept also grew out of a popular class at MIT (MAS.863) named "How To Make (Almost) Anything". The class is still offered in the fall semesters.

== Popular equipment and projects ==
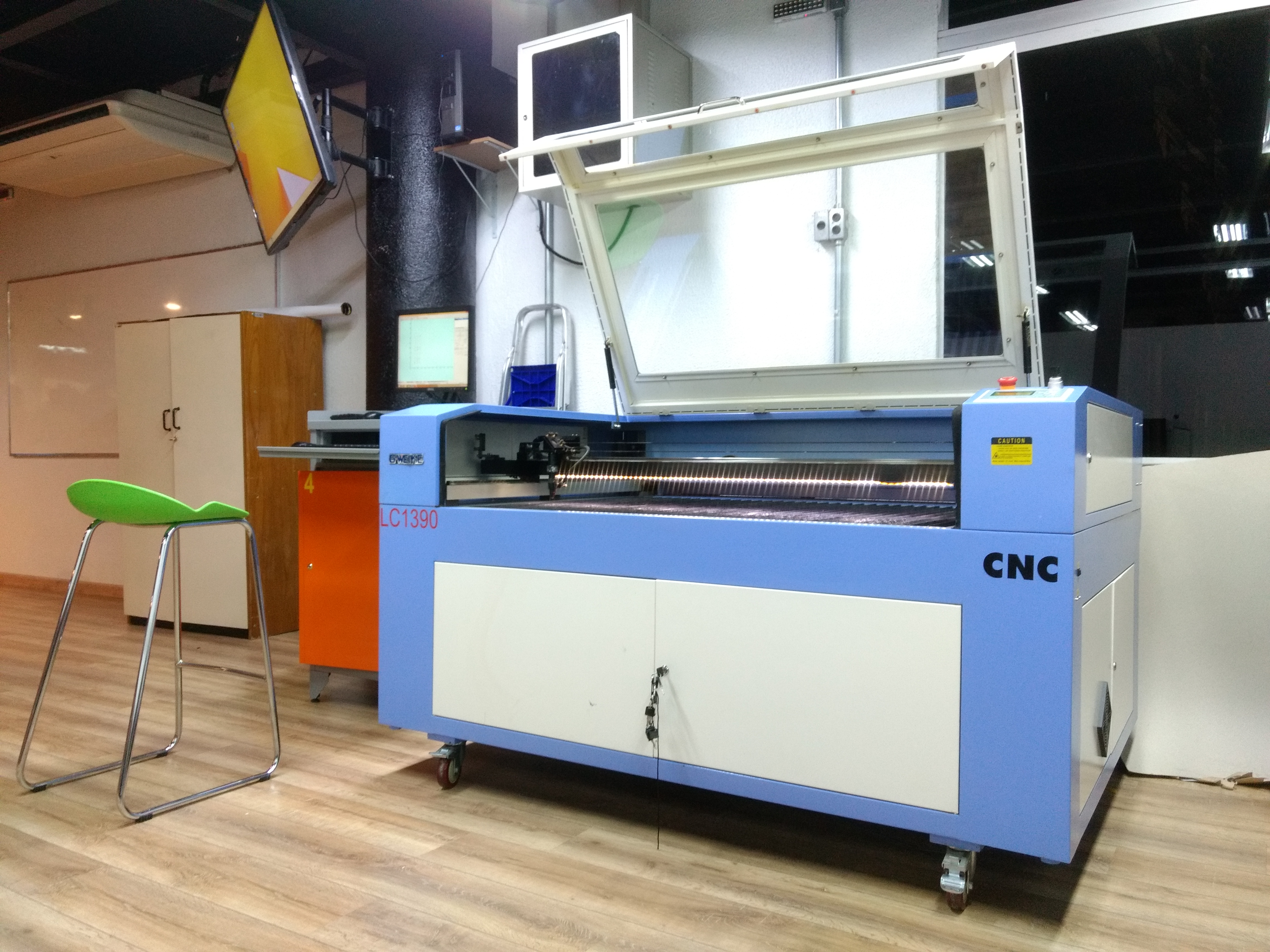
Laser cutter at a fab lab

Flexible manufacturing equipment within a fab lab can include:

- Mainly, a rapid prototyper: typically a 3D printer of plastic or plaster parts
- 3-axis CNC machines: 3 or more axes, computer-controlled subtractive milling or turning machines
- Printed circuit board milling or etching: two-dimensional, high precision milling to create circuit traces in pre-clad copper boards
- Microprocessor and digital electronics design, assembly, and test stations
- Cutters, for sheet material: laser cutter, plasma cutter, water jet cutter, knife cutter.

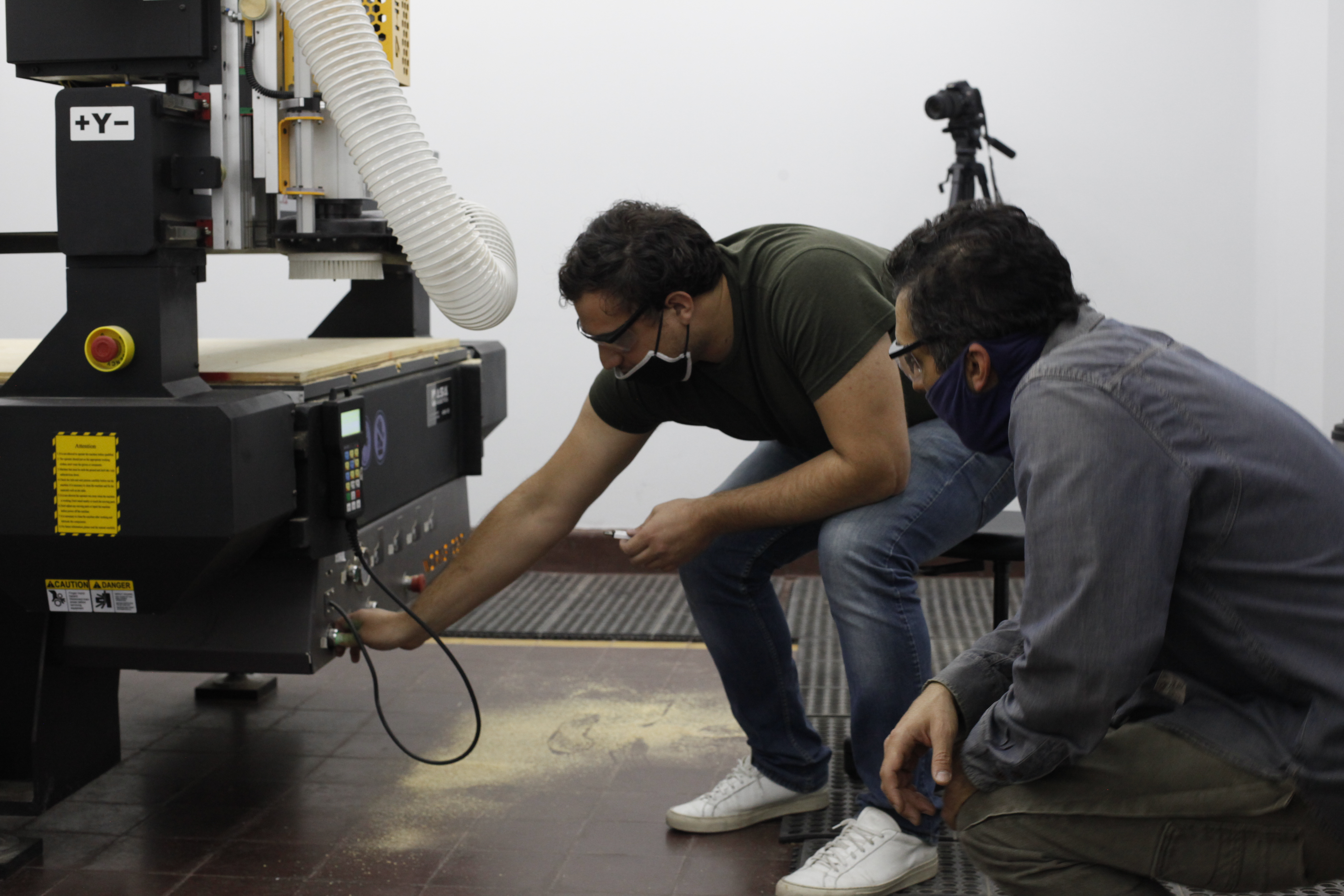
Material being processed in CNC machine, done in FabLAB located in LABNL Lab Cultural Ciudadano, Monterrey, N.L. (Nuevo León), Mexico, 2021.

== FabFi ==
One of the larger projects undertaken by fab labs include free community FabFi wireless networks (in Afghanistan, Kenya and US). The first city-scale FabFi network, set up in Afghanistan, has remained in place and active for three years under community supervision and with no special maintenance. The network in Kenya, (Based in the University of Nairobi (UoN)) building on that experience, started to experiment with controlling service quality and providing added services for a fee to make the network cost-neutral.

== Fab Academy ==
Fab Academy leverages the Fab Lab network to teach hands-on, digital fabrication skills. Students convene at Fab Lab "Supernodes" for the 19 week course to earn a diploma and build a portfolio. In some cases, the diploma is accredited or offers academic credit. The curriculum is based on MIT's rapid prototyping course MAS 863: How to Make (Almost) Anything. The course is estimated to cost US$5000, but varies with location and available scholarship opportunities. All course materials are publicly archived online here.

== Fab City ==
Fab City has been set up to explore innovative ways of creating the city of the future. It focuses on transforming and shaping the way how materials are sourced and used. This transformation should lead to a shift in the urban model from 'PITO to DIDO' that is, 'product-in, trash-out' to, data-in, data-out'. This can eventually transform cities into self-sufficient entities in 2054; in line with the pledge that Barcelona has made. The Fab City links to the fab lab movement, because they make use of the same human capital. The Fab cities make use of the innovative spirit of the users of the fab labs.

== Green Fab Labs ==
The Green Fab Lab Network, which started in Catalonia's Green Fablab, promotes environmental awareness through entrepreneurship. For example, they promote distributed recycling, where locals recycled their plastic waste turning locally sourced shredded plastic into items of value with fused particle fabrication/ fused granular fabrication (FPF/FGF) 3D printing, which not only is a good economic but also a good environmental option.

== List of labs ==
Listing of all official Fab Labs is maintained by the community through website fablabs.io. As of November 2019, there existed 1830 Fab Labs in the world in total. Currently there are Fab Labs on every continent except Antarctica.

== See also ==
- 3D printing – Additive process used to make a 3D object
- Hacker Culture – Book by Douglas Thomas
- Hackerspace – Community organization
- Makerspace – Community organization
- Open design – Movement for publicly shared designs
- Open hardware – Hardware whose design source files are made available
- Open Source Ecology – Ecology organisation
- RepRap – Self-replicating 3D printer initiative
- Technology education – Education in processes and use of technology
- TechShop – US chain of open-access workshops, 2006–2017
- Urban manufacturing – Production of goods within urban areas

=== Examples ===
- Apple Valley High School (Minnesota)
- Charlotte Latin School
- De WAR, Amersfoort, the Netherlands
- Fab Lab Barcelona
- Israel National Museum of Science, Technology, and Space
- John F. Kennedy High School (Richmond, California)
- Mobile fab lab
- Next Space Technologies for Exploration Partnerships
- Rigetti Computing
- Three Lakes High School (Wisconsin)
- Vigyan Ashram
- The Frisch School (New Jersey)
