= Sustainable South Bronx =

U.S. non-profit organization

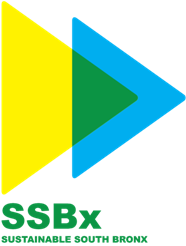
- Abbreviation: SSBx
- Named after: South Bronx
- Established: 2001; 25 years ago
- Founder: Majora Carter
- Founded at: Hunts Point, Bronx
- Type: Economic development corporation
- Legal status: 501(c)(3)
- Purpose: Environmental organization
- Headquarters: 1647 Macombs Rd. Bronx, NY 10453 US
- Parent organization: The HOPE Program
- Subsidiaries: SmartRoofs, LLC.
- Budget: $1,439,509 (2014)
- Website: www.ssbx.org

Sustainable South Bronx (SSBx) is a non-profit organization that promotes the concept of environmental justice. SSBx was founded by Majora Carter in 2001. Today, it is a division of the HOPE Program.

== See also ==
- New York Foundation
- Honor Award from the National Building Museum
