= Center for Bits and Atoms =

MIT research center

Coordinates: 42.3604°N 71.087°W

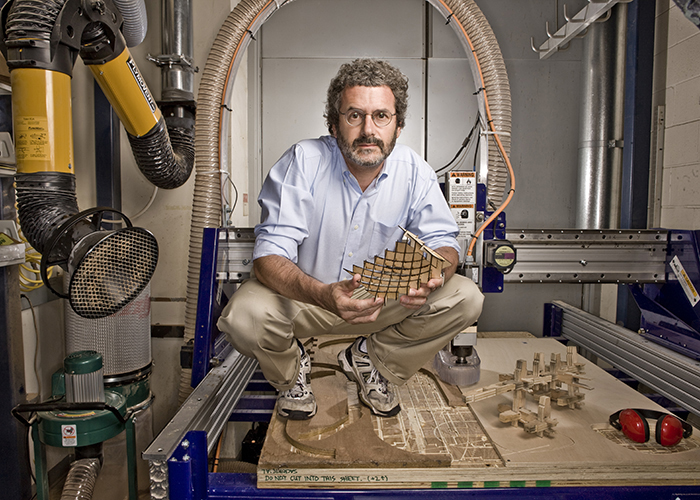
Neil Gershenfeld in 2008

The Center for Bits and Atoms (CBA) was established in 2001 in the MIT Media Lab at the Massachusetts Institute of Technology. It is currently run by Neil Gershenfeld. This cross-disciplinary center broadly looks at the intersection of information to its physical representation.

From the original NSF proposal:

MIT's Center for Bits and Atoms is an ambitious interdisciplinary initiative that is looking beyond the end of the Digital Revolution to ask how a functional description of a system can be embodied in, and abstracted from, a physical form. These simple, profound questions date back to the beginning of modern manufacturing and before that to the origins of natural science, but they have revolutionary new implications that follow from the recognition of the computational universality of physical systems. We can no longer afford to ignore nature's capabilities that have been neglected by conventional digital logic; it is at the boundary between the content of information and its physical representation that many of science's greatest technological, economic, and social opportunities and obstacles lie.

== Research ==
One of the early projects of the Center that has grown to become a global meme was the Fab lab—a model lab that could be set up quickly and inexpensively to provide basic fabrication capability for rapid prototyping of almost anything. The idea was that these labs would become easy enough to create that they could be set up almost anywhere in the world, and could be both self-sufficient and of use to the local community to support whatever engineering or fabrication projects they could imagine.

Since the first fab lab in 2001, a global community of supporters has grown up, including a FabFolk charitable organization. Roughly 100 groups calling themselves fab labs have grown up around the world, many supported at some stage by the CBA.

== Academics/classes ==
The Center for Bits and Atoms is not a degree-granting department but does offer MIT courses within the MAS department at the graduate level.

- MAS.863: How to Make (Almost) Anything
- MAS.961: How to Make Something That Makes (Almost) Anything
- MAS.864: The Nature of Mathematical Modeling
- MAS.862: The Physics of Information Technology
