= Edwin D. Mott =

American painter

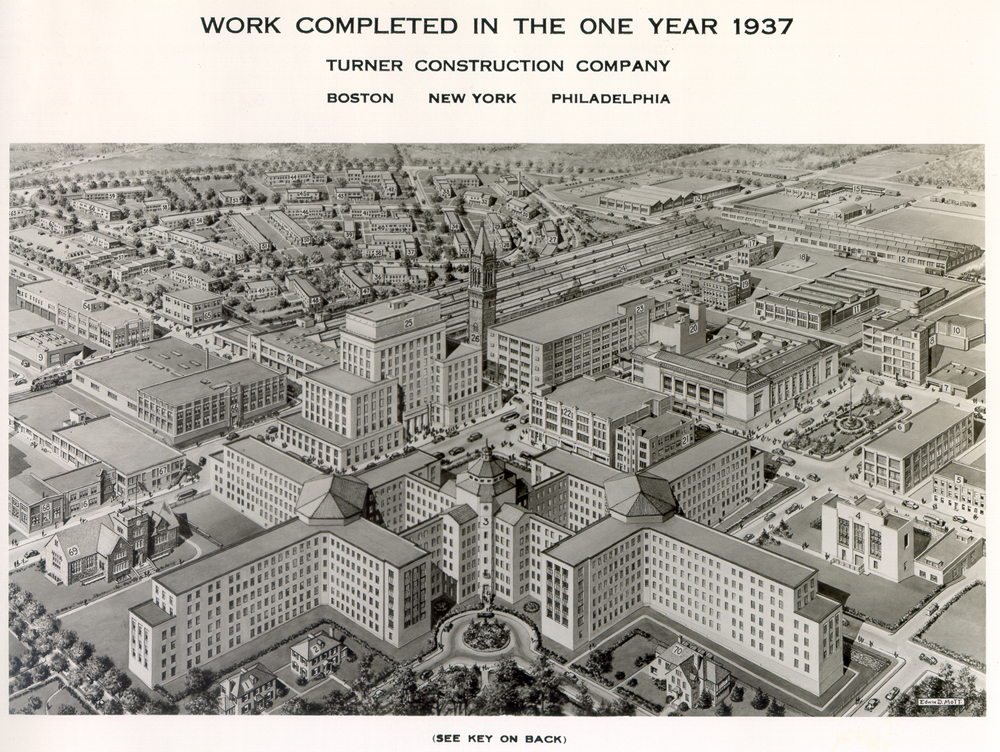
Turner City, 1937, by Edwin D. Mott

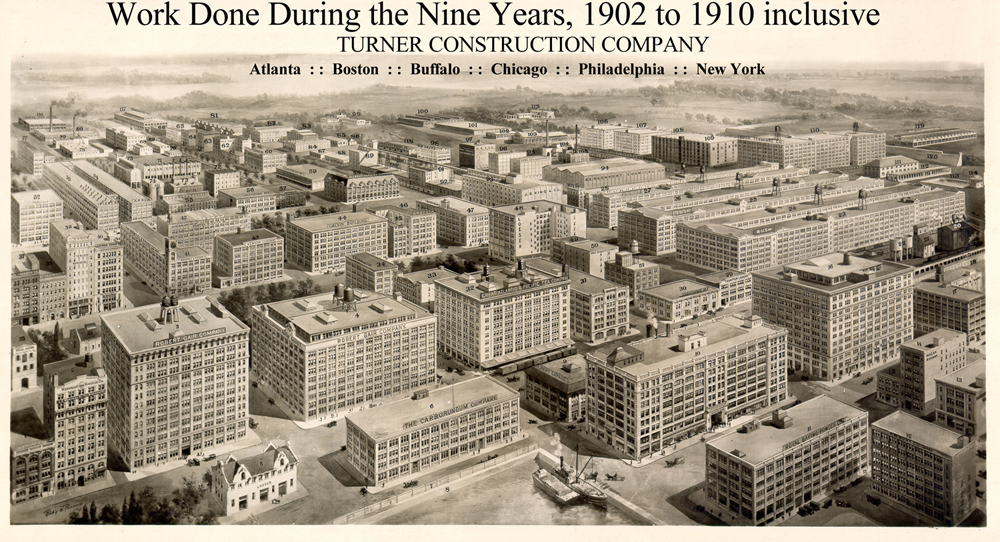
Turner City 1902–10, by Richard W. Rummell

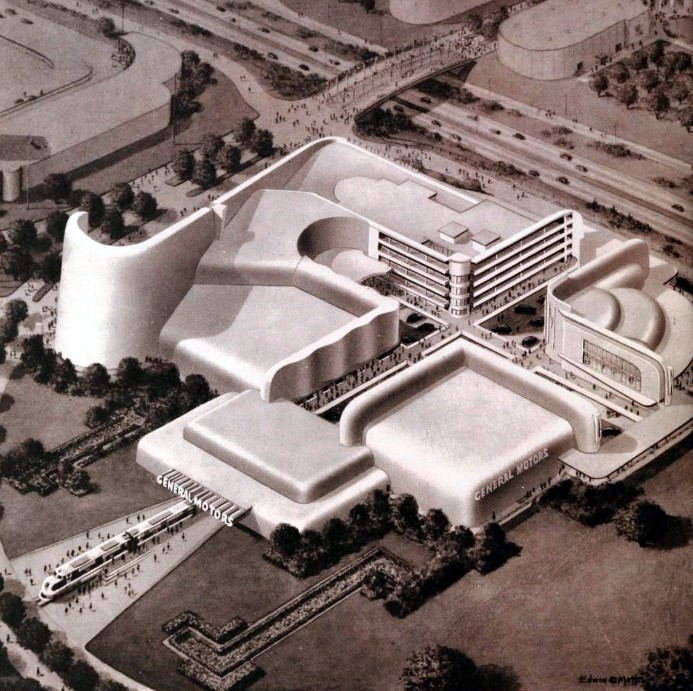
General Motors' Highways and Horizons building, 1939 New York World's Fair, by Edwin D. Mott

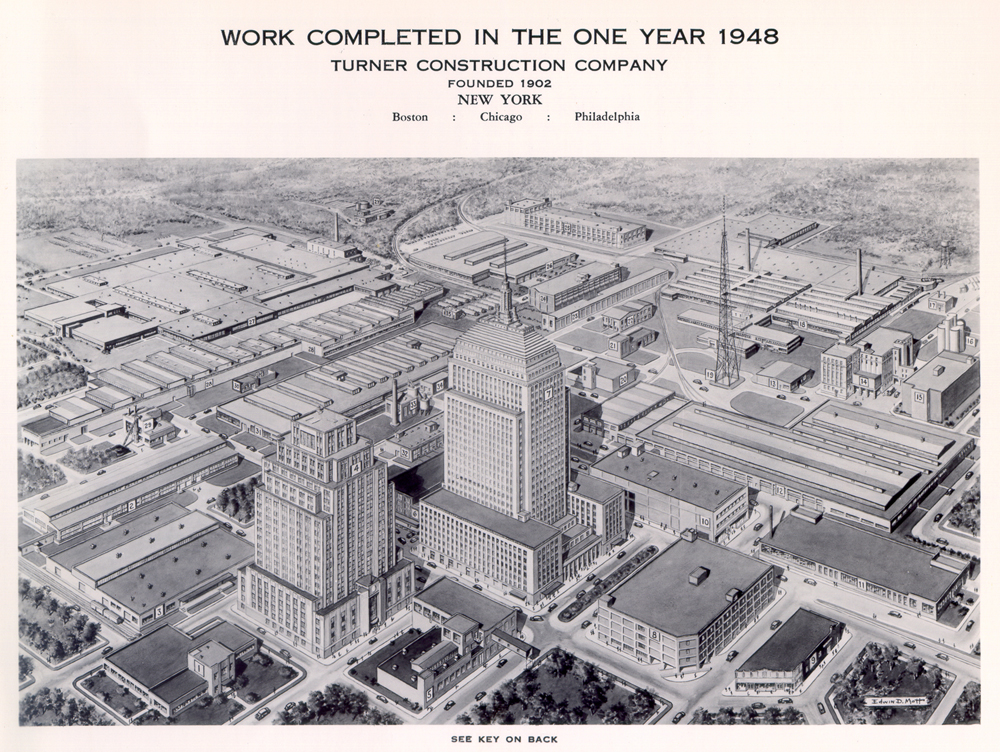
Turner City 1948, by Edwin D. Mott

Edwin Debaun Mott (17 April 1894 – 1962) was an American architectural and landscape artist who developed a specialism in highly detailed aerial views. He is known for his composite Turner City drawings for Turner Construction which he completed from 1929 to 1962. The drawings are now in the United States National Building Museum in Washington, D.C.

== Early life and family ==
Edwin Mott was born in Passaic, New Jersey, on 17 April 1894 to Zaidee L. Mott and the inventor Samuel Dimmick Mott (1852–1930) who held 36 patents, including one for a prototype of the helicopter propeller and who worked with Thomas Edison at his Menlo Park laboratories. Samuel's brother, and Edwin's uncle, Charles P. Mott (d. 1908) also worked for Edison. Edwin married Louise and had two daughters. His nephew was the commercial artist and cartoonist Herb Mott.

== Career ==
Mott had no formal education in art or architecture and only became an artist after becoming an apprentice to an architect and being told that his talent lay in art not architecture. He is best known for his work on the composite Turner City drawings for Turner Construction that have been produced annually since 1910.

He applied from exemption from the draft during the First World War on the basis that he had lost his sight in one eye.

He prepared the Turner City drawings for 1929 to 1962 in succession to Edward W. Spofford. It was a condition of the work that at least two sides of each building be shown and, ideally, with the entrance visible. Mott continued the aerial perspective method used by Richard W. Rummell, the first artist to prepare Turner City, receiving the blueprints months in advance and first making cardboard models of each building on a table to get the scale right. Then, in his studio in a converted garage, with the windows blacked-out, he would photograph the model from a step ladder and draw it in pencil, finishing with an ink wash. The street layout was from Mott's imagination but always different and he included a trademark train in each drawing. Each building was numbered and a key on the reverse gave their real location, apart from during the Second World War when that information was secret.

Around 1939, Mott's depiction of the General Motors' Highways and Horizons building for the 1939 New York World's Fair was shown in the company's publicity brochure for the exhibit. He was also a landscape painter and created an aerial view of Skytop Lodge, Pennsylvania, that adjusted the geography to include all the necessary features and was used for decades as the basis of maps used to orientate visitors to the lodge.

== Death and legacy ==
Mott died in 1962 from complications during surgery. In 1994, Turner Construction donated the Turner City drawings to the National Building Museum.
