= Dolores Hayden =

American historian, architect, and poet

- Spouse: Peter H. Marris
- Awards: Writer Magazine/Emily Dickinson Award; American Library Association Notable Book; Vincent Scully Prize

Academic background
- Education: Mount Holyoke College; Cambridge University; Harvard Graduate School of Design

Academic work
- Discipline: urban history architecture
- Institutions: Yale University; MIT; UC Berkeley; UCLA
- Main interests: social importance of urban space history of the built environment
- Notable works: Building Suburbia; The Power of Place; A Field Guide to Sprawl
- Website: https://doloreshayden.com

Dolores Hayden is an American professor emerita of architecture, urbanism, and American studies at Yale University. She is an urban historian, architect, author, and poet. Hayden has made innovative contributions to the understanding of the social importance of urban space and to the history of the built environment in the United States.

== Background ==
Hayden received her B.A. from Mount Holyoke College in 1966. She also studied at Cambridge University and the Harvard Graduate School of Design where she obtained her professional degree in architecture. She is the widow of sociologist and novelist, Peter H. Marris and is the mother of Laura Hayden Marris.

== Career ==
Since 1973, Hayden has held academic appointments at MIT, UC Berkeley, UCLA, and Yale. She has taught courses in architecture, urban landscapes, urban planning, and American studies.

She founded a Los Angeles-based non-profit arts and humanities group called The Power of Place which was active from 1984 to 1991. The goal of the organization was to, "celebrate the historic landscape of the center of the city and its ethnic diversity. Under her direction, collaborative projects on an African American midwife's homestead, a Latina garment workers' union headquarters, and Japanese-American flower fields engaged citizens, historians, artists, and designers in examining and commemorating the working lives of ordinary citizens." This is documented in the text, The Power of Place: Urban Landscapes as Public History.

== Awards ==
- American Library Association Notable Book
- Award for Excellence in Design Research from the National Endowment for the Arts
- Paul Davidoff Award for an outstanding book in Urban Planning from the ACSP
- Diana Donald Award for feminist scholarship from the American Planning Association
- Vincent Scully Prize, National Building Museum, 2022
- Matilde Ucelay Award, Spanish Ministry of Transport and Urban Agendas, 2022

== Selected bibliography ==
=== Books ===
- Exuberance: Poems, Red Hen Press, 2019.
- American Yard: Poems, 2004.
- A Field Guide to Sprawl (W. W. Norton, 2004) ISBN 9780393731255
- Building Suburbia: Green Fields and Urban Growth, 1820-2000 (Pantheon, 2004) ISBN 9780375727214
- Redesigning the American Dream: Gender, Housing, and Family Life, W W Norton, 1984, rev. ed. 2002. ISBN 9780393730944
- The Power of Place: Urban Landscapes as Public History, MIT Press, 1995.
- The Grand Domestic Revolution: A History of Feminist Designs for American Homes, Neighborhoods, and Cities, MIT Press, 1981.
  - 家事大革命―アメリカの住宅、近隣、都市におけるフェミニスト・デザインの歴史 ISBN 9784326600410
- Seven American Utopias: The Architecture of Communitarian Socialism, 1790-1975 (MIT Press, 1976) ISBN 9780262080828
- Nymph, Dun, and Spinner: Poems (David Robert Books, 2010) ISBN 9781936370061

=== Chapters ===
- 'Challenging the American Domestic Ideal', featured in Women in American Architecture: A Historic and Contemporary Perspective (1977)
- 'Catharine Beecher and the Politics of Housework', featured in Women in American Architecture: A Historic and Contemporary Perspective (1977)

=== Articles ===
- —— (1980). "What Would a Non-Sexist City Look Like? Speculations on Housing, Urban Design, and Human Work". 5 (3): S170–S187. JSTOR 3173814.
