= Charles Antone Horsky =

American lawyer

Charles Antone Horsky (March 22, 1910 – August 20, 1997) served as the Advisor on National Capital affairs under Presidents Kennedy and Johnson, and was a partner at the law firm of Covington & Burling for nearly forty years. In his role at the White House and thereafter, he helped pave the way for home rule of the District of Columbia at a time when much of the city’s governance was controlled by the U.S. Congress.

== Early life and education ==
Horsky was born in Helena, Montana, to Joseph T. Horsky and Margaret Bowden Horksy. His father was a state district judge in Montana. His mother was the daughter of English immigrants and died when he was 10 years old. Horsky grew up in Helena, and graduated from the University of Washington where he worked in a garage parking cars nearly every day. At the suggestion of his political science professor, he applied to Harvard Law School. Horsky said at the time that he didn't know where Harvard was on a map. He was accepted and later was elected President of the Law Review, and graduated in 1934.

== Career ==
Justice Felix Frankfurter, then a professor at Harvard and early mentor to Horsky, assigned him to clerk for Judge Augustus N. Hand on the 2nd Circuit in New York. Horsky worked with Judge Hand on various cases, several of which were patent cases. After a year, Judge Hand recommended that Horsky work for Stanley Reed, the new Solicitor General. Horsky went on to serve in the Solicitor General’s office from 1935-37 before moving to Covington, Burling, Rublee, Acheson & Shorb (currently Covington & Burling), a leading law firm in the District of Columbia where he rose to be a partner and worked on and off for nearly forty years.

Horsky's lectures to the Northwestern University School of Law in 1952 were collected in a book titled The Washington Lawyer.

== Notable cases ==
=== Korematsu v. United States (1944) ===
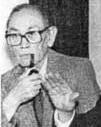
Fred Korematsu NPS

During World War II, Civilian Exclusion Order No. 34 of the U.S. Army required all Japanese Americans to report to internment camps for confinement. Fred Korematsu stayed in San Leandro, California, actively refusing to obey the order. He was arrested and convicted of violating the Order. The American Civil Liberties Union handled the appeal, and in 1944 Horsky, who founded the DC branch of the ACLU, argued the case before the United States Supreme Court alongside civil rights attorney Wayne M. Collins. He claimed that the Order was unconstitutional and that the DeWitt Report, which outlined reasons for the necessary removal of Japanese Americans, was false and misleading. The Supreme Court ruled in favor of the United States 6 to 3, upholding the constitutionality of the Order. In 1984, Mr. Korematsu had the previous case reexamined through a writ of coram nobis. The court ruled in his favor and overturned his previous conviction.

=== Nuremberg War Crimes Trials (1945-46) ===
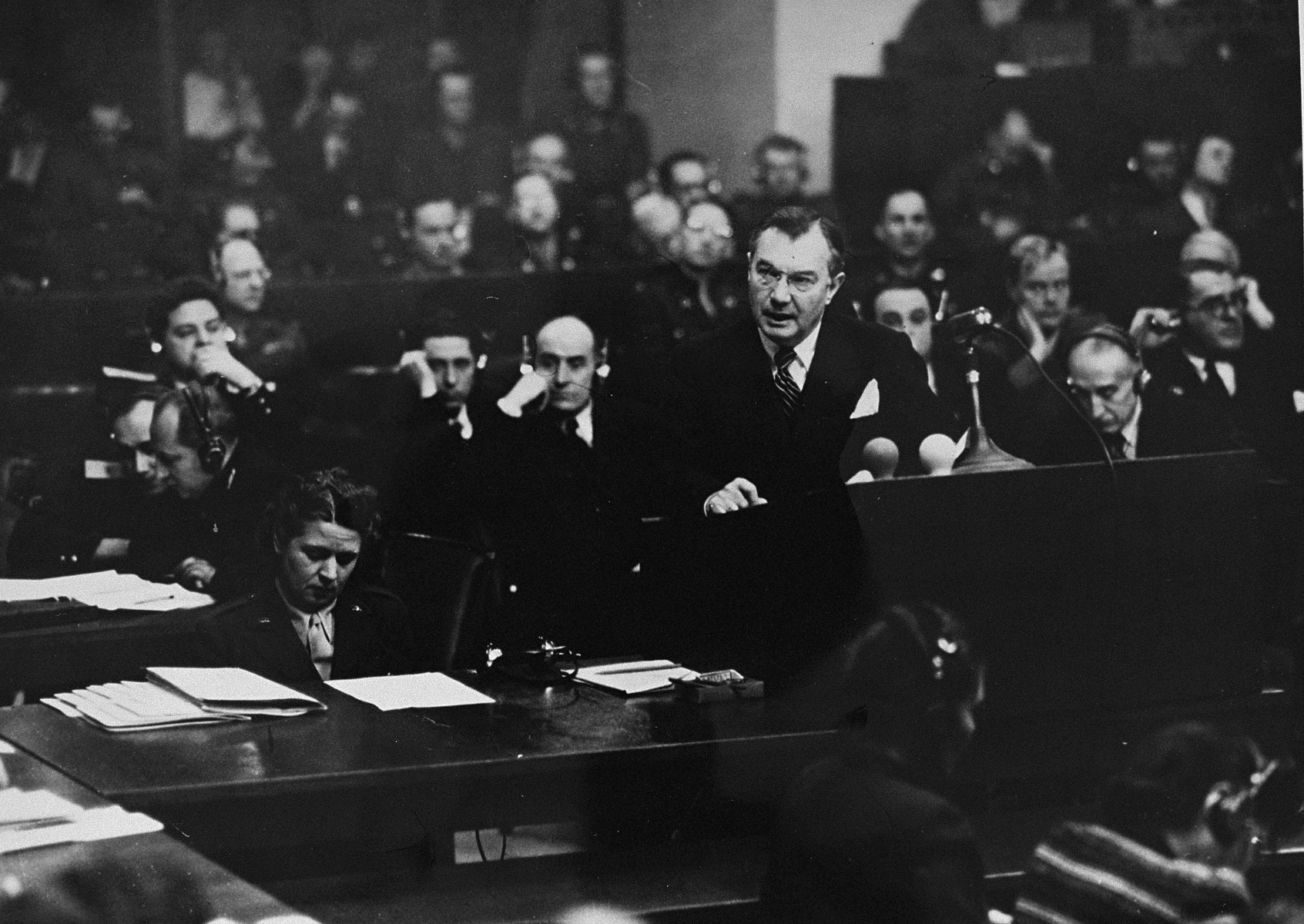
Prosecutor Robert Jackson at Nuremberg

In the wake of World War II, Horsky approached Robert Jackson, the chief prosecutor for the Nuremberg Trials, to collaborate on the cases. Jackson brought him on board, and Horsky was appointed to the temporary reserves of the Coast Guard so that he could have access to the confidential files pertinent to the case. Horsky helped manage the "state side" of the U.S. Government's prosecution in Germany, getting witnesses and affidavits while Jackson was abroad. Horsky went to Nuremberg for the sentencing phase and stayed there for several months helping to prosecute low-ranking Nazi officials.

=== Griffin v. Illinois (1955-56) ===
Judson Griffin and James Crenshaw had been charged and convicted of armed robbery, and sought to appeal. In 1955 in Illinois, to file an appeal one needed to purchase the transcript of proceedings at the trial court. Because they lacked sufficient funds to purchase a transcript, Griffin and Crenshaw filed a motion asking that they be provided with a transcript free of charge. The court denied the motion, but the defense then challenged the denial all the way to the United States Supreme Court, where Horsky argued the case in 1956. He won a 5–4 decision in favor of Griffin and Crenshaw.

=== Regional Rail Reorganization Act cases ===
While at Covington & Burling, Horsky oversaw several cases which transferred the control of rail lines from several older, typically bankrupt, railroad companies (Reading Company, The Central Railroad of New Jersey, and several others) to Conrail and Amtrak. This reorganization stabilized the railroad industry and gave birth to Conrail and Amtrak as large railroad companies.

== Public service ==
=== President of the Washington Planning and Housing Association (1960-62) ===
The Washington Planning and Housing Association (WPHA) worked to create affordable public housing for the impoverished in the District of Columbia. Horsky sent a donation to the WPHA, which had recently been refused funding from the Community Chest for its public housing projects. Though he thought it was a somewhat modest donation, it was one of the largest they had yet received. The WPHA elected him on to their board of directors, and, shortly afterward, he was elected as president of the board.

=== Advisor (to the President) on National Capital Affairs (1962-67) ===
After President Kennedy was elected, he sought to improve the condition of residents in the District of Columbia. Phillip Graham, the publisher of The Washington Post at the time, recommended Horsky to Kennedy as the man to help improve conditions in the District, and in 1962 Horsky was appointed as the first-ever Presidential Advisor on National Capital Affairs. On Horsky's recommendation, President Kennedy changed significantly the way the President presented the annual District budget to Congress. Instead of merely mentioning the DC budget in an appendix of the national budget, Horsky helped create a separate budget document including a statement from the President addressing current issues facing the District and proposing how to solve them. This structural change elevated the status and treatment of the District's annual budget by the Office of the President and played a key role in adjusting attitudes towards the District as an autonomous governmental unit, and not merely an appendage to the federal government.

As Advisor to the President on National Capital Affairs, Horsky helped bolster the need and funding for a subway system in DC. He helped negotiate early agreements between the three jurisdictions of DC, Maryland, and Virginia, and worked to assure congressional approval for the Metro project. In this regards, Horsky faced stark opposition from the cab, bus, highway, and street car companies and organizations.

Under President Johnson, Horsky drafted the first “home rule” bill, designed to establish a Mayor and City Council elected by the residents of the District of Columbia. Previously, many of the important city positions were assigned to individuals through federal appointments because Congress governed the District. Though this home rule bill failed to pass through the House of Representatives, President Johnson utilized his Executive authority to reorganize the District government, and Horsky was instrumental in recruiting Walter Washington, then head of the New York Housing Authority, to serve as the first appointed Mayor of the District. This reorganization laid the foundation for the current limited jurisdictional independence of the District.

=== The Horsky Report (1982) ===
While on the Board of Governors for the DC Bar, Horsky was appointed to lead a DC Court System Study Committee examining the status of the local court system ten years after a major Congressional reorganization of the DC courts. He was chosen for his legal and political expertise and for his reputation as a neutral party.

Horsky hired Samuel F. Harahan to serve as Executive Director of the DC Bar Board of Governors Court Study Committee. The Committee was split into nine subcommittees, each analyzing specific trial and appellate units such as civil, criminal, juvenile, probate and tax, the DC Court of Appeals, and others. Each subcommittee developed a lengthy written report describing the system prior to the reorganization, depicting the courts at the present, and where warranted recommending changes. The full Horsky Committee reviewed each of these individual draft reports before they were adopted by the full body.

The DC Bar's Horsky report was vast, spanning nearly a thousand pages, and was ultimately published as a US Senate document. Many of the suggestions for change were adopted by the DC Courts' administration or the US Congress through legislation in the following years.

=== The Council for Court Excellence ===
As the Horsky Report was nearly completion, Horsky and Sam Harahan and others were concerned about how best to assure the implementation of the many reform proposals found in the Horsky Report, and of the need for ongoing monitoring and support of the local and federal courts. Sam Harahan and Bill Slate met with Horsky and encouraged him to support and help lead a new, more permanent broadly-based nonpartisan court improvement organization. In January 1982, Horsky, Harahan, Slate and a number of other concerned citizens founded the Council for Court Excellence, a nonprofit nonpartisan organization whose mission is to bring lawyers, judges, and community members together to promote judicial reform, access to justice, and to promote public education about the judicial system. Since 1982, the organization has been successfully engaged in over forty separate major judicial reform and educational initiatives, and produced a wealth of literature educating the public about the judicial system.

== Other work ==
Horsky’s resume is diverse and expansive. Among many other roles, he served as Chairman of the National Bankruptcy Conference, Chairman of the DC Board of Education, President of the Eugene & Agnes E. Meyer Foundation, Chair of the Visitors' Services Center, and Director and President of the DC International Horse Show. He received the Pro Bono Award from the DC Bar in 1989.
In 1997, a month after his death, he was posthumously awarded the Honor Award from the National Building Museum as a community builder of Washington, D.C.

== Personal life ==
Horsky married Barbara Egleston Horsky (1937) and adopted two children, Margaret and Antone (Tony). Horsky took trips from the Washington, D.C., suburb of Silver Spring, Maryland, to his cabin in Lincoln, Montana, nearly every summer, where he often brought his friends for memorable pack trips in the Bob Marshall Wilderness. In Montana, he fly-fished, hiked, and drove around in his late father's vintage green Oldsmobile. Back in Washington, up until near the time of his death, Horsky was regularly observed driving his 1962 Ford Galaxie with the top down, in deep winter, with no overcoat.

He died on August 20, 1997, in Silver Spring, Maryland, due to kidney failure.
