= TEV =

TEV may refer to:

- Transient Earth voltage: a term for voltages appearing on the metal work of switchgear due to internal partial discharges
- TeV, or teraelectronvolt or trillion electron volt, a measure of energy
- Total enterprise value, a financial measure
- Total economic value, an economic measure
- Tracked Electric Vehicles, an open source electric vehicle system proposed by the TEV Project
- Transparent Election Verification Software, open source software for auditing elections
- Tobacco etch virus, a plant pathogenic virus of the family Potyviridae
  - Tobacco etch virus protease, an enzyme commonly used in biochemistry
- Today's English Version, a former name for the Good News Bible
- TEV, a ship prefix for Turbo-electric Vessel, usually with steam driven turbines.
- Thermal expansion valve, a refrigeration system component
- The IATA code designator for Teruel Airport
