= Elizabeth K. Meyer =

Landscape architect

Elizabeth K. Meyer is an American landscape architect. She is the Merrill D. Peterson Professor of Landscape Architecture at the University of Virginia.

== Education and career ==
Meyer has a B.S. from the University of Virginia (1978), an M.A. from Cornell University (1983), and a Master of Landscape Architecture from the University of Virginia (1982). She has taught at Cornell University, George Washington University, Harvard University, and the University of Virginia where she moved in 1993. In 2013 she was promoted to professor, and in 2014 she was named the Merrill D. Peterson Professor of Landscape Architecture.

She founded the UVA Center for Cultural Landscapes. The center was founded as a “collaborative hub for scholars and practitioners seeking to create new models for cultural landscape research, interpretation, preservation and adaptive use.”

She has collaborated with the Cultural Landscape Foundation on a two-day workshop on the urban cultural landscapes of Richmond, Virginia.

Also with the CLF, she worked on The Cultural Landscape Atlas of Virginia.

== Honors and awards ==
In 2003 she was named a fellow of the American Society of Landscape Architects, and in 2012 she became a fellow of the Council of Educators in Landscape Architecture. In 2018, the Journal of Landscape Architecture dedicated a volume to Meyer's work in the field of landscape architecture. In 2019, Meyers received the Vincent Scully Prize from the National Building Museum, and in 2021 the Society for College and University Planning awarded Meyers and her collaborators for their work on the campus plan for Wellesley College.

== Selected publications ==
- Meyer wrote the foreword for Jana VanderGoot's Architecture and the Forest Aesthetic: A New Look at Design and Resilient Urbanism (Routledge, 2018)
- Meyer, Elizabeth K. (2008-03-01). "Sustaining beauty. The performance of appearance". Journal of Landscape Architecture. 3 (1): 6–23. Bibcode:2008JLaAr...3a...6M. doi:10.1080/18626033.2008.9723392. ISSN 1862-6033. S2CID 142514457.
- Site matters : strategies for uncertainty through planning and design. Andrea Kahn, Carol Burns (Second ed.). Abingdon, Oxon. 2021. ISBN 978-0-429-20238-4. OCLC 1163934896.
- Meyer, Elizabeth K. (2008). "Recycling: Landscape Architecture's New Frontier". SiteLINES: A Journal of Place. 3 (2): 5–7. ISSN 2572-0457. JSTOR 24889303.
- Meyer, Elizabeth K. (2008). "From Urban Prospect to Retrospect: Lessons from the World War II Memorial Debates". Journal of Architectural Education. 61 (3): 57–63. doi:10.1111/j.1531-314X.2007.00170.x. ISSN 1046-4883. JSTOR 40480774. S2CID 109132134.
