= Futurama (New York World's Fair) =

1939 exhibit by General Motors

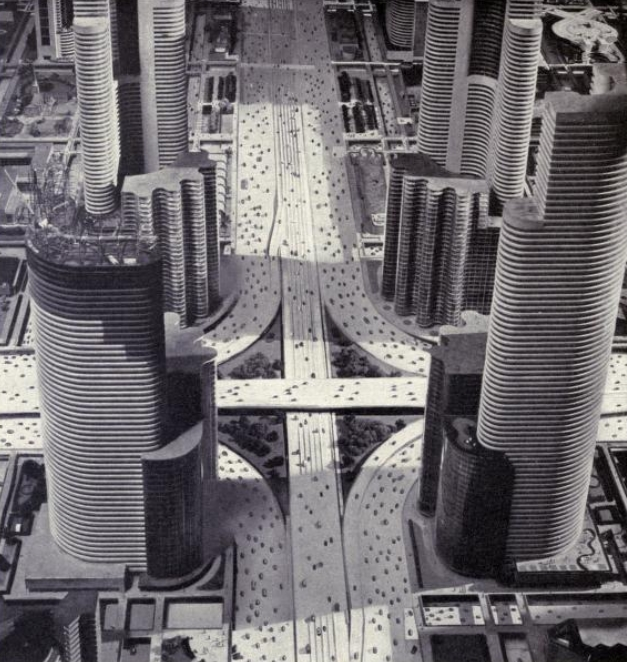
Detail of the Futurama diorama

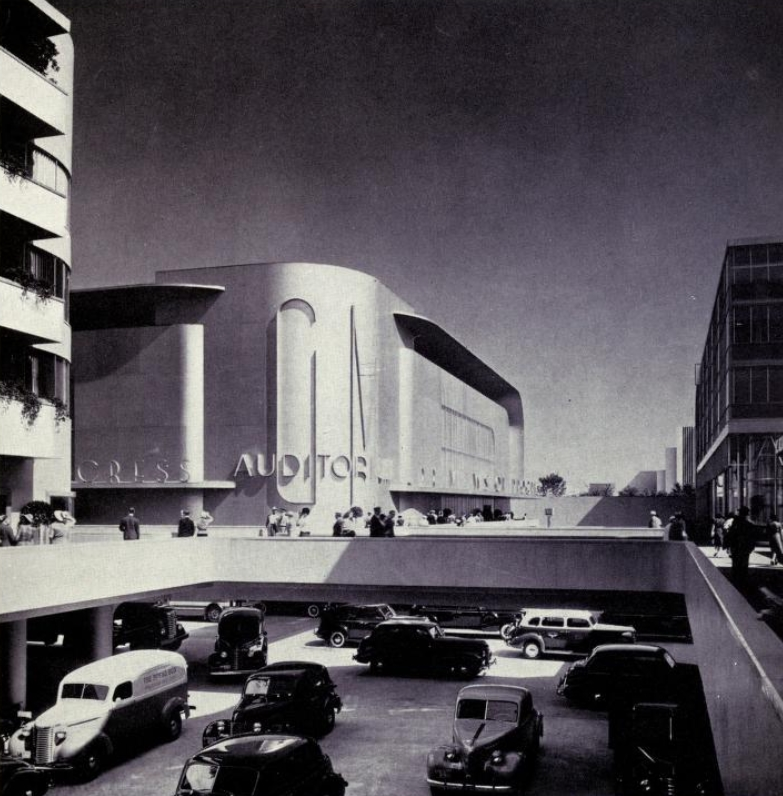
Full size Futurama street intersection, c. 1939

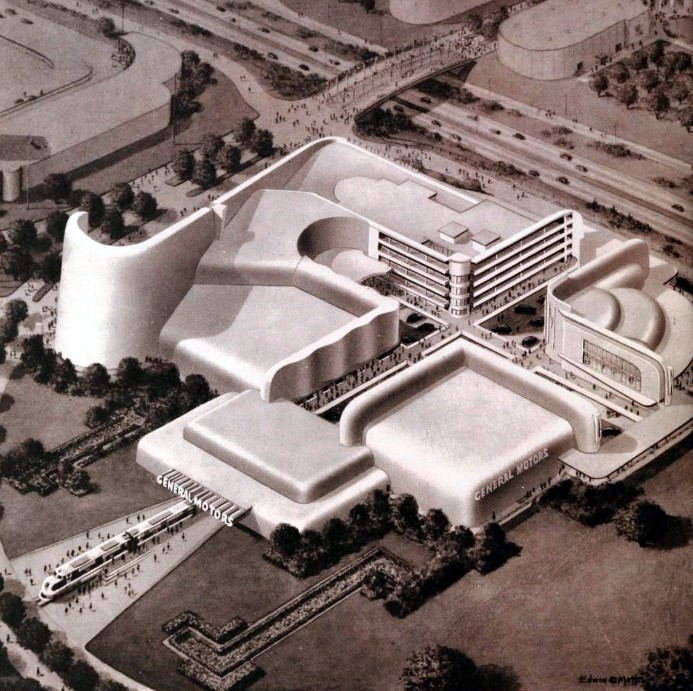
Illustration of the Highways and Horizons building by Edwin D. Mott, c. 1939

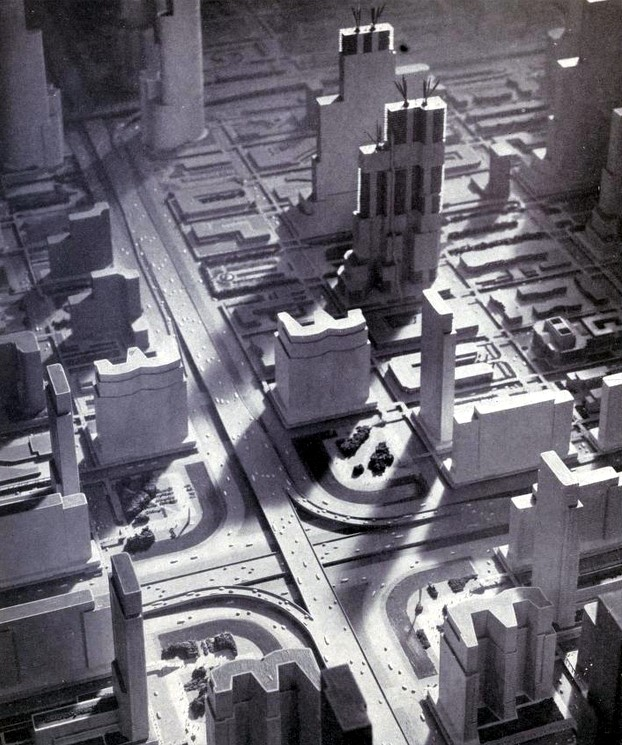
Shell Oil City of Tomorrow model, c. 1936/37

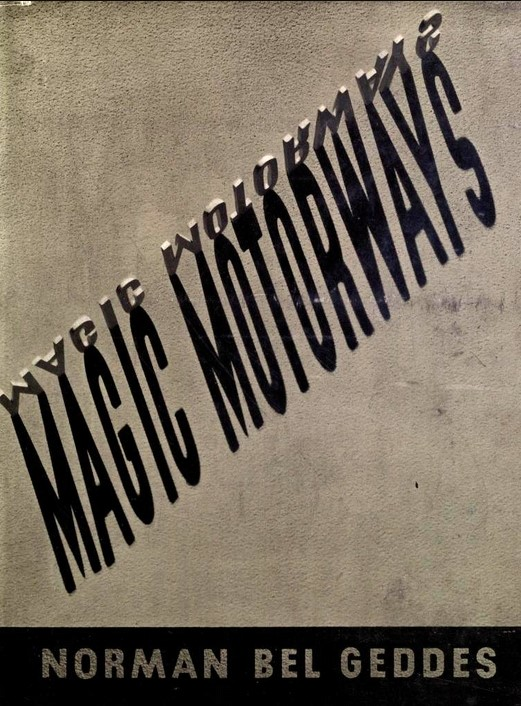
Cover of Magic Motorways by Norman Bel Geddes, Random House, New York, 1940

Futurama was an exhibit and ride at the 1939 New York World's Fair designed by Norman Bel Geddes, which presented a possible model of the world 20 years into the future (1959–1960). The installation was sponsored by the General Motors Corporation and was characterized by automated highways and vast suburbs.

== Background ==
Geddes had built a model city for a Shell Oil advertising campaign in 1937 that was described as the Shell Oil City of Tomorrow and was effectively a prototype for the much larger and more ambitious Futurama.

== Overview ==
Geddes' "vision of the future" was rather achievable; the most advanced technology posited was the automated highway system of which General Motors built a working prototype by 1960. Futurama is widely held to have first introduced the general American public to the concept of a network of expressways connecting the nation. It provided a direct connection between the streamlined style which was popular in America at the time, and the concept of steady-flow which appeared in street and highway design in the same period.

Geddes expounds upon his design in his book Magic Motorways:

Futurama is a large-scale model representing almost every type of terrain in America and illustrating how a motorway system may be laid down over the entire country—across mountains, over rivers and lakes, through cities and past towns—never deviating from a direct course and always adhering to the four basic principles of highway design: safety, comfort, speed, and economy.

The modeled highway construction emphasized hope for the future as it served as a proposed solution to traffic congestion of the day, and demonstrated the probable development of traffic in proportion to the automotive growth of the next 20 years. Bel Geddes assumed that the automobile would be the same type of carrier and still the most common means of transportation in 1960, albeit with increased vehicle use and traffic lanes also capable of much higher speeds.

Four general ideas for improvement were incorporated into the exhibition showcase to meet these assumptions.

- First, each section of road was designed to receive greater capacity of traffic.
- Second, traffic moving in one direction could be isolated from traffic moving in any other.
- Third, segregating traffic by subdividing towns and cities into certain units restricted traffic and allowed pedestrians to predominate.
- And fourth, traffic control included maximum and minimum speeds.

Through this, the exhibition was designed to inspire greater public enthusiasm and support for the constructive work and planning of streets and highways.

The popularity of the Futurama exhibit fit closely with the fair's overall theme of "The World of Tomorrow" in its emphasis on the future and its redesign of the American landscape. The highway system was supported within a 1 acre (0.40 ha) animated model of a projected America containing more than 500,000 individually designed buildings, a million trees of 13 different species, and approximately 50,000 cars, 10,000 of which traveled along a 14-lane multi-speed interstate highway. It prophesied an American utopia regulated by an assortment of cutting-edge technologies: multi-lane highways with remote-controlled semi-automated vehicles (according to Geddes' Magic Motorways, these vehicles are supposed to be equipped with lane centering and lane change/blind spot assist systems), power plants, farms for artificially produced crops, rooftop platforms for individual flying machines, and various gadgets, all intended to make an ideal built environment and ultimately to reform society.

Geddes' "future" was synonymous with technological progress in its simulated low-flying airplane journey through the exhibit. The aerial journey was simulated by an 18-minute ride on a conveyor system, carrying 552 seated spectators at a time, covering a 1/3 mi (0.5 km) winding path through the model, along with light, sound, and color effects. The ride moved at a rate of approximately 120 ft (37 m) per minute or 1.36 mph (2.19 km/h), allowing spectators to look down through a continuous curved pane of glass towards the model. The virtue of this elevated position allowed spectators to see multiple scales simultaneously, viewing city blocks in proportion to a highway system, as well as artificially controlled trees in glass domes. This scale was modeled off 408 topographical sections based on aerial photographs of different regions of the U.S. provided by Fairchild Aircraft Ltd.

== Reception ==
Before General Motors invited Bel Geddes to submit a proposal for the exhibit, they had planned to put in another production line as was featured at their exhibit in the Century of Progress Exposition of 1933 in Chicago. However, after they heard Bel Geddes outline his project all other plans were scrapped as they favored his design for its appeal to a broader audience. The Futurama exhibition was subsequently presented as one of the 1939 New York World Fair's main attractions, as it was the "number-one hit show". It was considered highly interesting by the public and critics alike, with journalists competing to find adequate words to convey Bel Geddes' "ingenuity", "daring", "showmanship" and "genius". One neutral survey of 1000 departing fairgoers awarded the General Motors exhibit 39.4 points to only 8.5 points for second place Ford as the most interesting exhibit. Business Week described the scene:

More than 30,000 persons daily, the show's capacity, inch along the sizzling pavement in long queues until they reach the chairs which transport them to a tourist's paradise. It unfolds a prophecy of cities, towns, and countrysides served by a comprehensive road system.

His ideas of the future were considered to have a remarkable degree of realism and immediacy, especially for an American audience slowly recovering from the Great Depression and that was longing for prosperity. Futurama's imaginary landscape of 1960 was, at the time, seen not just as a novel physical space, but as a glimpse of the future.

== Legacy ==
Multiple Federal-Aid Highway Act bills of legislation, which led to the Interstate Highway System, were influenced by massive attendance at Futurama that helped to popularize the concept of modern interstate highways.

The General Motors pavilion at the 1964 New York World's Fair included a ride, Futurama II, that was also known as "The New Futurama".

The 1964 version had a 110 foot tall front facade which was tilted toward the viewer as they approached the front of the building. Inside, moving theater seats took visitors on a multi-media ride into the future around the world, narrated by a description of all the future scenarios. After the 15 minute ride, visitors exited into a showroom of futuristic models and current General Motors products.

The October 1965 attendance statistics beat the old record from 1939 for the two-year period by about five million visitors, the largest ever attendance of any exhibit at any fair in the world.

It is the namesake of the show Futurama.

== See also ==
- Automotive city
- List of proposed future transport
- Transit desert
- World of Motion
- Automated highway system
- EPCOT
