= Honor Award =

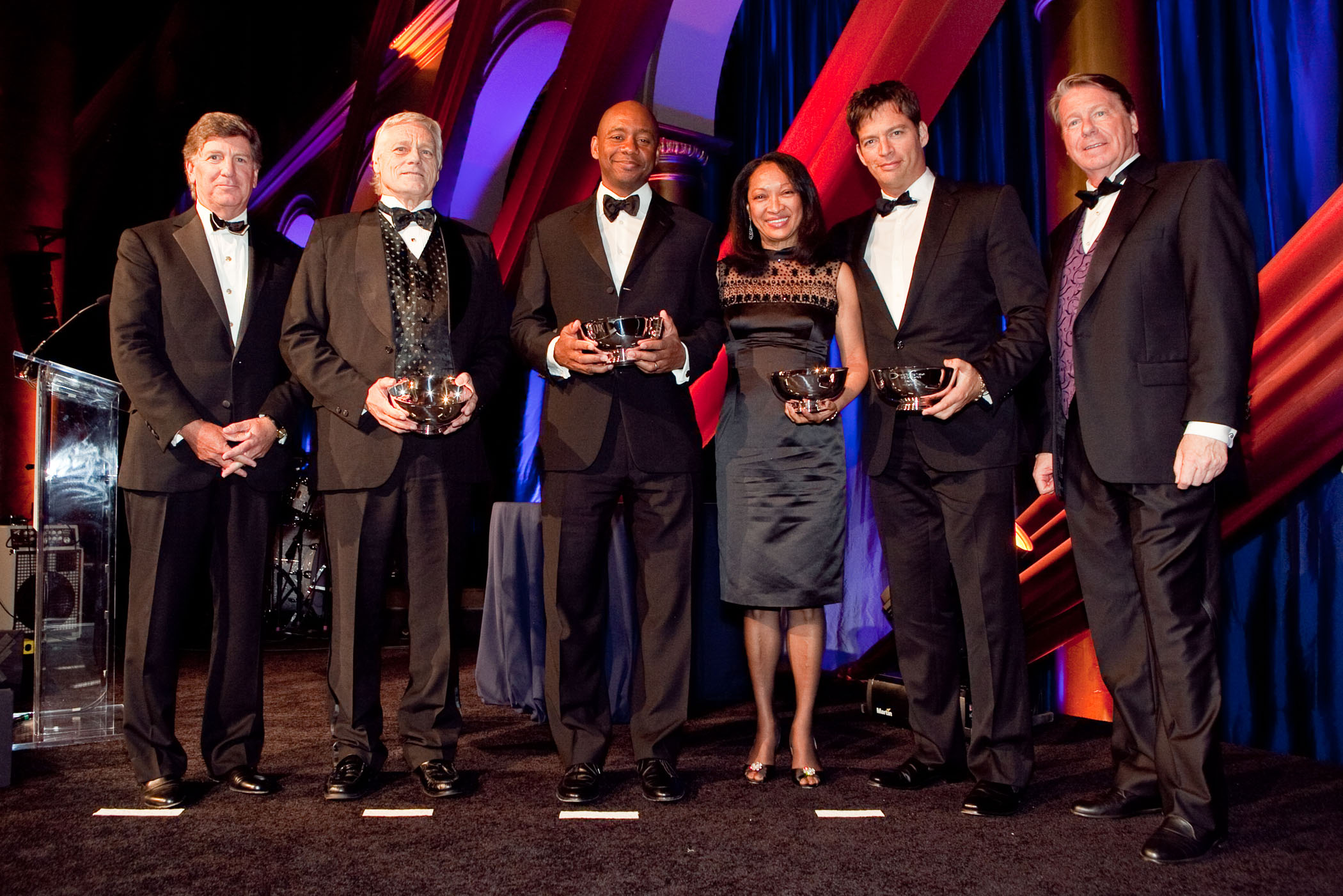
2010 Honor Award winners, founders of New Orleans Habitat Musicians’ Village, stand with National Building Museum chair Michael Glosserman (far L) and executive director Chase Rynd (far R); winners, from L to R: Jim Pate, Branford Marsalis, Ann Marie Wilkins, and Harry Connick, Jr.

The National Building Museum promotes excellence in architecture, engineering, construction, planning, and design. In furtherance of that mission, the Museum instituted an annual Honor Award in 1986 to recognize individuals and organizations that have made important contributions to the U.S.'s building heritage. Recipients are selected from a wide variety of backgrounds to call attention to the many factors that determine the form and quality of the built world.
Past recipients include ex-First Lady Lady Bird Johnson, who was honored in 1995 for her lifetime leadership in beautification and conservation campaigns. Michael Eisner and The Walt Disney Company were honored in 2001 in recognition of their commitment to architecture, commissioning postmodernist architects such as Michael Graves, Robert A.M. Stern, Frank Gehry, and Arata Isozaki. In 2010, Perkins and Will became the first architecture firm ever to receive the prize for "designing buildings that promote the health of occupants, conserve resources, and unify communities," in the words of Museum executive director Chase W. Rynd.
The National Building Museum also bestows two other major awards: the Vincent Scully Prize to recognize exemplary practice, scholarship, or criticism in architecture, historic preservation, and urban design and the Henry C. Turner Prize for Innovation in Construction Technology.

== List of Honor Award winners ==
Year	Recipients
2011	"Celebrating Our Past, Building Our Future: 25 Years of the Honor Award"
2010	"A Salute to Civic Innovators": Perkins + Will, the founders of New Orleans Habitat Musicians' Village, The U.S. Department of Energy Solar Decathlon
2009	"A Salute to Visionaries in Sustainability": S. Richard Fedrizzi and the U.S. Green Building Council; Richard M. Daley and the City of Chicago; Majora Carter, founder of Sustainable South Bronx; Louis R. Chênevert and United Technologies Corporation
2008	Associated General Contractors of America
2007	Related
2006	Clark Construction Group, LLC
2005	Forest City Enterprises
2004	General Services Administration
2003	Major League Baseball and the National Football League
2002	DuPont
2001	Michael Eisner and The Walt Disney Company
2000	Gerald D. Hines
1999	Harold McGraw, Jr., Harold McGraw III, and the McGraw-Hill Companies
1998	Stephen Bechtel, Jr., Riley P. Bechtel, and The Bechtel Group
1997	Community Builders of Washington, D.C.: Morris Cafritz, Charles E. Smith, Oliver T. Carr, jr., and Charles A. Horsky
1996	Cindy and Jay Pritzker
1995	Lady Bird Johnson
1994	James A. Johnson and Fannie Mae
1993	J. Carter Brown
1992	Civic Leadership of Greater Pittsburgh
1991	The Rockefeller Family
1990	IBM
1989	Senator Daniel Patrick Moynihan
1988	James Rouse
1986	J. Irwin Miller
