= List of proposed future transport =

Transport today is mostly powered by fossil fuel. The reason for this is the ease of use and the existence of mature technologies harnessing this fuel source. Fossil fuels represent a concentrated, relatively compact source of energy. The drawbacks are that they are heavily polluting and rely on limited natural resources. There are many proposals to harness renewable forms of energy, to use fossil fuel more efficiently, or to use human power, or some hybrid of these, to move people and things.

The list below contains some forms of transport not in general use, but considered as possibilities in the future.

== Proposed future transport ==
- Air-propelled train (abandoned in 19th century)
  - Bounce tube pneumatic travel (Proposed by Robert A. Heinlein in 1956)
  - Vactrain also known as ET3
- BiModal Glideway (Dual Mode Transportation System) travel (Proposed by William D. Davis, Jr. in 1967)
- TEV Project (proposed by Will Jones in Summer 2012)
- Dual-mode vehicle
- Hovercar
- Hyperloop
- Intelligent Transportation System
- Jet pack
- Backpack helicopter
- Personal air vehicle (Flying car)
- Personal rapid transit
  - Shweeb
- Rolling road (proposed by Robert A. Heinlein in 1940)
  - Slidewalk (proposed by Robert A. Heinlein in 1948)
- Teleportation
- SkyTran
- Spacecraft propulsion or Space transport
  - Launch loop
  - Orbital ring
  - Light sail (proposed by Jack Vance in 1962)
  - Space elevator (proposed by Russian scientist Konstantin Tsiolkovsky in 1895)
- Ringway Transportation System
