= Vincent Scully Prize =

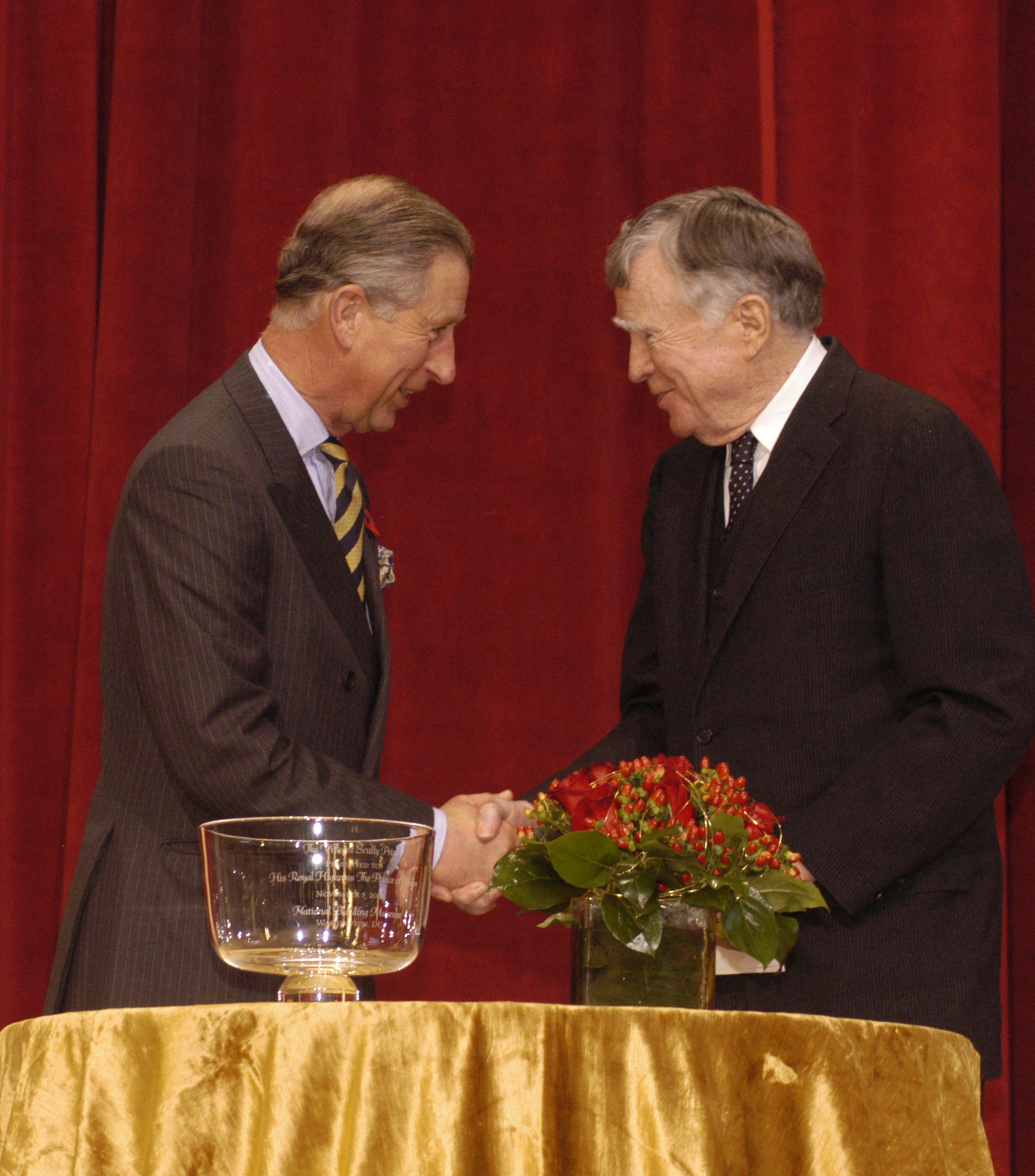
Charles III accepts the 2005 Scully Prize from Professor Vincent Scully at the National Building Museum.

The Vincent Scully Prize was established in 1999 to recognize exemplary practice, scholarship or criticism in architecture, historic preservation and urban design. Created by the National Building Museum in Washington, D.C., the award first honored the distinguished Yale professor and namesake of the award, author and educator, Vincent Scully.

The Museum’s website states that the Prize is awarded annually, however no award was made in 2003, 2004, 2015 or 2016. These omissions are not explained on the website.

The 2014 Prize was presented to former talk show host Charlie Rose. The Museum website no longer lists Rose as a winner of the Prize.

The National Building Museum awards two other annual prizes: the Honor Award for individuals and organizations who have made important contributions to the U.S.'s building heritage, and the Henry C. Turner Prize for Innovation in Construction Technology.

== Recipients ==
Number	Year	Recipient
I.	1999	Vincent Scully
II.	2000	Jane Jacobs
III.	2001	Andres Duany and Elizabeth Plater-Zyberk
IV.	2002	Robert Venturi and Denise Scott Brown
V.	2005	His Highness the Aga Khan established The Aga Khan Award for Architecture in 1977
VI.	2005	His Royal Highness The Prince of Wales (now Charles III), for long-standing interest in the built environment and commitment to creating urban areas with human scale
VII.	2006	Phyllis Lambert, architect, educator, activist, philanthropist and founder of the Canadian Centre for Architecture and planning director for the Seagram Building
VIII.	2007	Witold Rybczynski, architecture critic, author and professor
IX.	2007	Richard Moe, president of the National Trust for Historic Preservation
X.	2008	Robert A. M. Stern, Dean of the Yale University School of Architecture
XI.	2009	Christopher Alexander, architect, architecture theorist, author and professor
XII.	2010	Adele Chatfield-Taylor, president of the American Academy in Rome
XIII.	2011	William K. Reilly, former administrator of the Environmental Protection Agency
XIV.	2012	Paul Goldberger, architecture critic
XV.	2013	Joshua David and Robert Hammond, the co-founders of the Friends of the High Line in New York City
XVI.	2014	Charlie Rose, executive producer, executive editor, and host of Charlie Rose
XVII.	2017	Laurie Olin, landscape architect
XVIII.	2018	Inga Saffron, architecture critic, and Robert Campbell, FAIA, architecture critic
XIX.	2019	Elizabeth K. Meyer, professor of landscape architecture at the University of Virginia
XX.	2021	Mabel O. Wilson, architect
XXI.	2022	Dolores Hayden, professor emerita of architecture, urbanism and American studies at Yale University
XXII.	2023	Theaster Gates, installation artist and professor
XXIII.	2024	Walter J. Hood, designer, artist, academic administrator, and educator
