= Wayne M. Collins =

American civil rights lawyer (1899–1974)

- Born: November 23, 1899; Sacramento, California
- Died: July 16, 1974 (aged 74)
- Occupation: Civil Rights Attorney

Wayne Mortimer Collins (November 23, 1899 – July 16, 1974) was a civil rights lawyer who worked on cases related to the Japanese American evacuation and internment.

== Biography ==
=== Personal life ===
Collins was born in Sacramento, California, to Irish American parents, and was raised and educated in San Francisco. In 1907, Collins' father died from tuberculosis and his mother was unable to retain custody of her two sons. As a result, Collins spent much of his youth in an institutional home affiliated with the Swedenborgian Church in San Francisco's Potrero Hill area. While living there, he attended what became Lick-Wilmerding High School from which he received a diploma.

Collins enlisted in the Navy towards the end of World War I. He earned his law degree from San Francisco Law School in 1927 and opened a law office in the Mills Building complex of San Francisco's Financial District in the following year. In 1930, he was reunited with his mother and younger brother, to whom he provided financial support.

In 1933, Collins married Thelma Garrison, with whom he had two children. The family lived in an apartment in the Nob Hill neighborhood of San Francisco for a number of years, and later moved to a home on Presidio Avenue in 1950. Thelma died of cancer in 1953, and Collins did not remarry.

=== Legal career ===
In 1934, Collins helped to establish the Northern California branch of the ACLU in response to anti-worker and anti-union campaigns of employers against protesting workers in rural California and against striking maritime workers in California. Collins' first major case for the branch was on behalf of a nine-year old Jehovah's Witness who had been suspended from school for refusing to cite the Pledge of Allegiance based on religious grounds. He later became a leader in the legal fight against persecution of Japanese Americans, both during and after World War II.

==== Korematsu ====
With Ernest Besig of the Northern California ACLU, Collins led Fred Korematsu's constitutional challenge to the Internment of Japanese Americans beginning in 1942, and culminating in his defense of Korematsu (alongside the ACLU's Charles Horskey) before the U.S. Supreme Court in 1944. In a 6–3 decision, the U.S. Supreme Court upheld Korematsu's conviction in Korematsu v. United States in December of that year. Nearly four decades later, in November 1983, the U.S. District Court in San Francisco formally granted the writ of coram nobis and vacated the conviction.

==== Tule Lake and the Renunciants ====
In the spring of 1944, Ernest Besig became aware of a hastily constructed stockade at California's Tule Lake Segregation Center, in which Japanese American internees were routinely being brutalized and held for months without due process. Besig was forbidden by the national ACLU to intervene on behalf of the stockade prisoners or even to visit the Tule Lake camp without prior written approval from the ACLU's Roger Baldwin. Unable to help directly, Besig turned to Wayne Collins for assistance. Collins, using the threat of habeas corpus suits, managed to have the stockade closed down. A year later, after learning that the stockade had been reestablished, he returned to the camp and had it closed down for good.

In August 1945, Collins began advising Japanese American internees at Tule Lake who had been deceived or coerced into renouncing their American citizenship under the Renunciation Act of 1944 of their legal rights. On November 13, 1945, Collins filed two mass class equity suits (Abo v. Clark, No. 25294 and Furuya v. Clark, No. 25295) and two mass class habeas corpus proceedings (Abo v. Williams, No. 25296 and Furuya v. Williams, No. 25297) in the U.S. District Court of San Francisco. These cases sought to determine nationality, prevent removal to Japan, end internment, and cancel renunciation. Adopting Collins' arguments, Federal Judge Louis E. Goodman found the mass renunciations unconstitutional, stating: "It is shocking to the conscience that an American citizen be confined without authority and while so under duress and restraint for this government to accept from him a surrender of his constitutional heritage." "Not even the hysterics and exigencies of war", Goodman had warned in his opinion, "excused the government for the egregious constitutional wrongs it had committed by imprisoning citizens not charged with a crime".

When the federal appeals court ruled that each renunciant's case had to be individually decided, Collins embarked on a 23-year campaign, filing thousands of court cases to successfully recover the renunciants' citizenships. Collins said that he viewed the renunciations as an expression of their "opposition to injustice."

==== Japanese Latin American internees ====
Collins represented some 3,000 Japanese Latin Americans kidnapped by the U.S. during the war to be bartered for American prisoners of war. While most were deported after the war as "undesirable aliens", Collins successfully enabled hundreds to remain and make their homes in America.

==== Iva Toguri ====
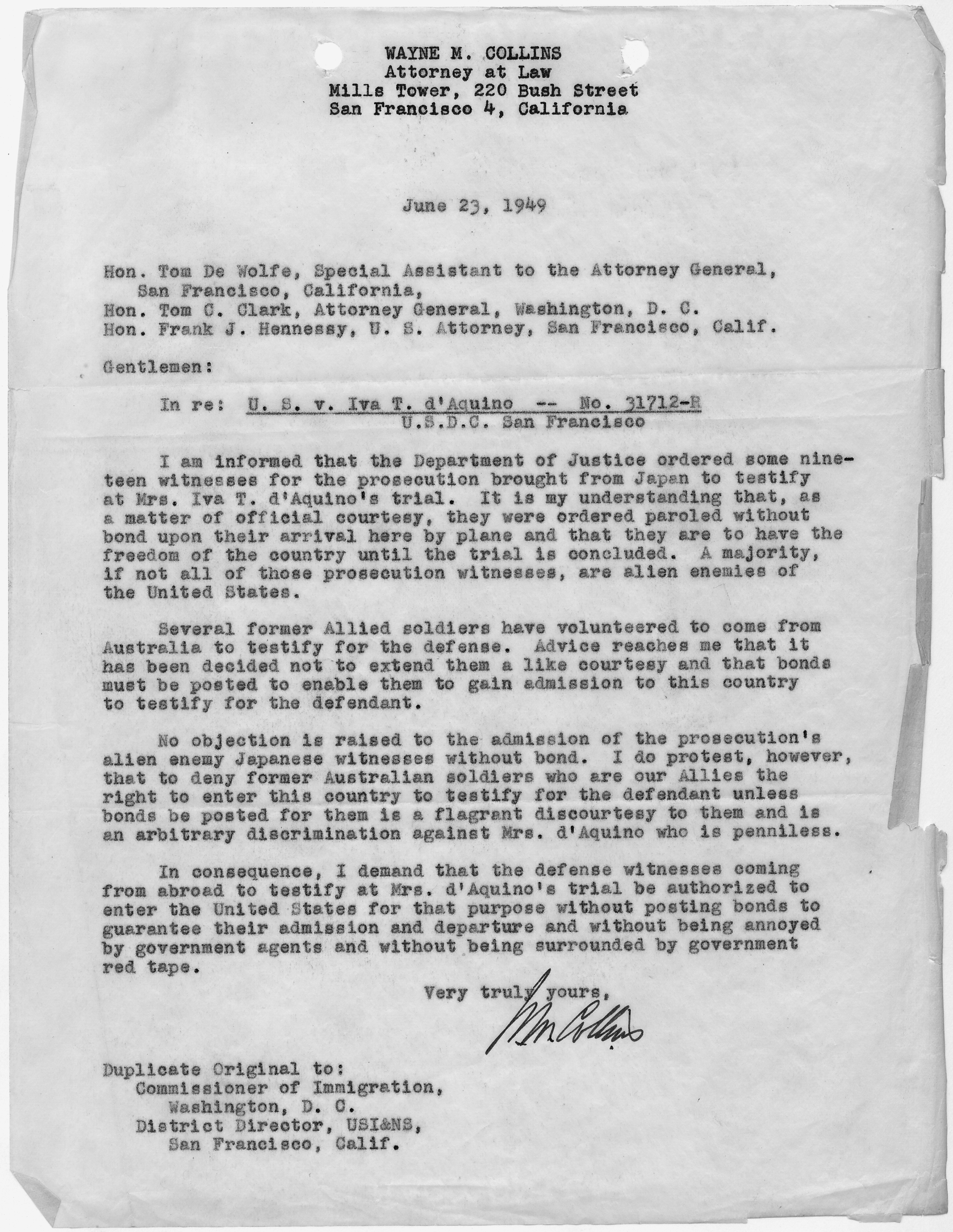
Letter from Wayne M. Collins requesting that equal privileges be extended to Australian witnesses for the defense in the trial of Iva Toguri D'Aquino.

In 1949 Collins, with Besig and Theodore Tamba, defended Iva Toguri D'Aquino against charges of treason. Through the use of perjured testimony and falsified evidence, she was convicted of being "Tokyo Rose" in the most expensive trial in American history as of that time. Following her release from prison in 1956, Collins continued his efforts to have her name cleared.

==== Other legal activities ====
In addition to his case work on behalf of Japanese Americans, Collins performed other legal activities during the 1950s and 1960s. This included legal work on behalf of the Swedenborgian Church, the defense of some East Indian immigrants against deportation, the representation of several educators who had refused to sign California's loyalty oath, and the defense of several Berkeley Free Speech Movement leaders.

=== Death ===
Collins suffered a heart attack on a plane and died on July 16, 1974, while returning home from a business trip to Hong Kong. Collins' son, Wayne Merrill Collins, subsequently took on some of the cases his father was actively working on at the time of his death. This included the filing of a presidential pardon petition for Iva Toguri D'Aquino, which President Gerald R. Ford granted during his final days in office.

== Recognition ==
Although largely unknown to the general public, Collins' relentless efforts on behalf of the Japanese Americans have been recognized in various posthumous honors and dedications. For example, the poet Hiroshi Kashiwagi dedicated his book Swimming in the American: a Memoir and Selected Writings to Collins, saying that he "rescued me as an American and restored my faith in America". In the dedication for her influential book Years of Infamy: The Untold Story of America's Concentration Camps, former internee Michi Nishiura Weglyn wrote that Collins "... did more to correct a democracy's mistake than any other one person". Collins also appears in George Takei's 2019 autobiographical graphic novel, They Called Us Enemy.
