= Henry C. Turner Prize for Innovation in Construction Technology =

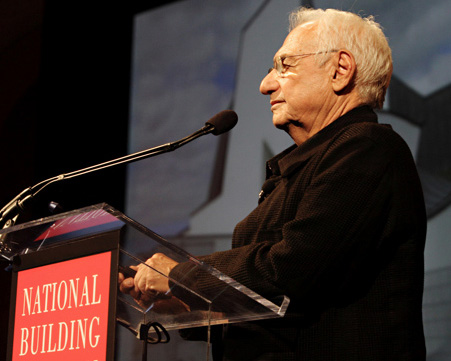
At the 2007 Turner Prize ceremony at the National Building Museum, Frank Gehry gives a presentation on the work of Gehry Partners and Gehry Technologies driving construction innovation.

The Henry C. Turner Prize for Innovation in Construction Technology is awarded annually by the National Building Museum to recognize outstanding leadership and innovation in the field of construction methods and processes, including engineering design and construction techniques and practices. Created in 2002 by an endowment established by the Turner Construction Company and named after the company's founder, the prize carries a cash award of $25,000.
Past honorees include individuals and organizations such as architect I. M. Pei, for encouraging construction and engineering innovation with his designs; Stanford University civil engineering professor Paul Teicholz, for his work in paving the way for Building Information Modeling; and Engineers Without Borders–USA for efforts in creating sustainable infrastructure in poverty-stricken world communities and for "instilling a sense of global responsibility in the next generation of engineers," according to the award jury. When Frank Gehry accepted the prize on behalf of Gehry Partners in 2007, he stated, "I've gotten a lot of awards from the artsy side of the profession, but this one's from the meat-and-potatoes side, and that's pretty special."
In addition to the Turner Prize, the National Building Museum also awards the Vincent Scully Prize, which honors exemplary practice, scholarship, or criticism in architecture, historic preservation, and urban design, and the Honor Award for individuals and organizations who have made important contributions to the U.S.'s building heritage.

== List of Turner Prize winners ==
Year	Recipient
2014	Department of Architectural Engineering of the Pennsylvania State University
2011	Caterpillar, Inc.
2010	Engineers Without Borders–USA
2008	Charles H. Thornton, co-founder of Thornton Tomasetti
2007	Gehry Partners and Gehry Technologies
2007	Dr. Paul Teicholz
2005	U.S. Green Building Council
2004	Charles A. DeBenedittis, senior managing director of design and construction, Tishman Speyer Properties
2003	I. M. Pei
2002	Leslie E. Robertson
