= TEV Project =

Company which creates hypothetical highway designs

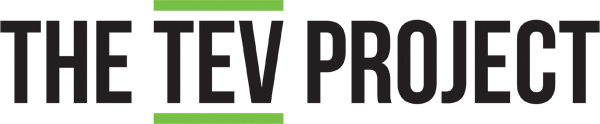
The TEV Project logo

The TEV Project (Tracked Electric Vehicle Project) is a company which creates hypothetical highway designs. TEV's design is a dual-mode, electrified infrastructure that would continually power conventional, rubber tire electric vehicles such as cars, taxis, vans and minibuses and allow them to operate under software control. The company was founded by father and son Will Jones and Caroline Jones Carrick and was incorporated in 2014.
