= Last Day on Earth =

Last Day on Earth may refer to:

== Music ==
- Last Day on Earth (album), a 1994 album by John Cale & Bob Neuwirth
- "Last Day on Earth", a song by Duran Duran from the album Pop Trash
- "The Last Day on Earth", a 2009 song by Kate Miller-Heidke
- "The Last Day on Earth", a song by Marilyn Manson from the album Mechanical Animals

== Films ==
- 4:44 Last Day on Earth, a 2011 drama
- Last Day on Earth (film), a 2012 film starring Bellamy Young

== Television ==
- Last Days on Earth, a 20/20 special which aired in 2006
- "Last Day on Earth" (The Walking Dead), an episode of The Walking Dead television series

== See also ==
- Last days (disambiguation)
- Last Night on Earth (disambiguation)
