= Lady T =

"Lady T" can refer to:

- Margaret Thatcher, British politician
- Teena Marie, American singer
- Thalía, Mexican singer
- Trijntje Oosterhuis, Dutch singer
- Lady T (album), a 1980 album by Teena Marie
- "Lady T", a single by Crazy P, from their 2005 album A Night on Earth
- the women's sports teams at Dakota State University
