= The End Is Near =

The End Is Near is a doomsday prophecy sometimes seen written on signs. The phrase may refer to:

- The End Is Near (Five Iron Frenzy album), 2003
- The End Is Near (The New Year album), 2004

== See also ==
- End time (disambiguation)
- "I Know the End", song by Phoebe Bridgers, 2020
