= Thundercats episodes =

ThunderCats episodes may refer to:

- List of ThunderCats (1985 TV series) episodes
- List of ThunderCats (2011 TV series) episodes
