= End of days =

End of days may refer to:

== Arts, entertainment, and media ==
=== Films ===
- End of Days (film), a 1999 supernatural film
- Carnival: At the End of Days, an upcoming fantasy film

=== Music ===
- The End of Days, a 2010 album by Abney Park
- End of Days (soundtrack), a soundtrack album from the 1999 film
- "End of Days", a song by Bullet for My Valentine from Scream Aim Fire
- "End of Days", a song by Strife from Witness a Rebirth
- End of Days (Discharge album), a 2016 album by English hardcore punk band Discharge

=== Television ===
- End of Days (Big Love), an episode of the American TV series Big Love
- "End of Days" (Buffy the Vampire Slayer), a 2003 television episode
- "End of Days" (Torchwood), a 2007 television episode
- "End of Days", a 2001 episode of Queen of Swords
- "End of Days", an episode of Hart of Dixie

=== Other uses in arts, entertainment, and media ===
- Daredevil: End of Days, an American comic book series
- End of Days, a 2008 novel by Sylvia Browne
- End of Days, a 2012 novel by Eric Walters
- The End of Days, a 2015 novel by Jenny Erpenbeck
- End of Days, a 2026 history of the Ruby Ridge standoff by Chris Jennings

== Religion ==
- Eschatology, a religious concept also known as the end of days

== See also ==
- End of All Days, album by Rage
- End of day, the end of the trading day in a financial market
- EOD (disambiguation)
- End time (disambiguation)
