= Joshua Pearce =

American engineer

Joshua M. Pearce
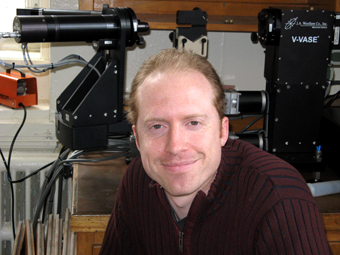
- Education: The Pennsylvania State University
- Known for: solar photovoltaics, open source hardware, distributed recycling and additive manufacturing, resilient food
- Scientific career
- Fields: photovoltaics, open-source-appropriate technology, materials engineering, protocrystallinity, open-source hardware, electrical engineering
- Workplaces: University of Western Ontario, Michigan Tech, Queen's University
- Doctoral advisor: Christopher R. Wronski
- Website: Appropedia User Page

Joshua M. Pearce is an academic engineer at Western University and a fellow of the Canadian Academy of Engineering. He is known for his work on protocrystallinity, photovoltaic technology, agrivoltaics, open-source-appropriate technology, and open-source hardware including RepRap 3D printers and recyclebots.

== Career ==
Pearce received his Ph.D. at Pennsylvania State University, where his work on protocrystallinity helped develop low-cost amorphous silicon solar photovoltaic technology. His solar research and outreach continues. For example, his research group published a levelized cost of electricity study on solar energy showed solar electricity was economically competitive with fossil fuels over wide geographic regions. and showed the value of solar (VOS) often exceeds the net metering rate. This makes solar attractive especially over underutilized areas like parking lots as pointed out by Vox. He showed 1% of Canada's agricultural land converted to agrivoltaics would rid the national grid if carbon emissions while increasing food. This can be done with animals as he showed even shepherds could make a good living taking care of 'solar sheep'. The CBC has quoted him discussing this large potential of agrivoltaics to provide lower cost electricity while increasing food supplies. His research into bidirectional reflectance distribution function modeling of reflectors showed potential solar systems output increases of 30%. His research supports solar canopies for parking lots, floatovoltaics and aquavoltaics. In addition he promotes the DIY and maker movements, with the release of To Catch the Sun as open access.

He is also a vocal advocate of an open-source approach to technical development. For his work related to open-source nanotechnology, Ars Technica compared him to American software freedom activist Richard Stallman. He applied open-source 3-D printing and electronics to scientific equipment design, where he has claimed both superior innovation and lower costs. Reviewing his book Open-Source Lab, 3-D Printing Industry wrote, "This is a manual that every scientist should read and it holds a message so powerful and disruptive that the Anarchist Cookbook is a fairy tale in comparison." This work has extended to making frugal biomedical equipment and aids. For example, the Globe and Mail highlighted an open source 3D printable walker as well as a CTV story on an open source surgical fracture table developed in his lab.

His research has shown that printing household items with a RepRap is less costly and better for the environment than purchasing conventionally manufactured goods. Similarly, his group developed the recyclebot, a waste plastic extruder, which drops the cost of 3D printing filament from $35/kg to ten cents per kg while making recycling even more environmentally beneficial. He also helped develop the concept of fused granular fabrication (FGF) where shredded waste plastic is directly converted to products with the company re:3D.

In 2013 his group released an open-source 3D printer capable of printing in steel, which cost less than US$1,200. in order to encourage more rapid technological development according to Scientific American. This cost reduction was significant as The New York Times reported commercial metal printers at the time cost over US$500,000.

He further developed inexpensive methods such as SODIS to disinfect drinking water in the developing world, using sunlight, water bottles, and salt. He has called for corporate death penalties for industries that kill more people than they employ. The MIT Sloan Management Review reported that Dr. Pearce has combined many of his research areas developing solar powered 3-D printers to drive sustainable development.

Since his 2015 book with David Denkberger Feeding Everyone No Matter What: Managing Food Security After Global Catastrophe, he has worked on alternative food/ resilient food sources. For example, the New York Times commented on his work to feed astronauts through a complex process of converting asteroids to food. Similarly, the Toronto Star ran a story on his work to recycle waste plastic into protein bars as well as the use of an agrovoltaic agrotunnel to grow net zero energy food indoors year round. They quoted his graduate student: "“He is not content with merely advancing scientific knowledge; he is driven by a deep-seated desire to use that knowledge and push the boundaries to improve the lives of people everywhere,” she said. “He embodies the spirit of turning impossible dreams into reality, into feasible solutions.”

== Bibliography ==
- Open-Source Lab (book):How to Build Your Own Hardware and Reduce Research Costs. Elsevier (2014).
- David Denkenberger and Joshua Pearce, Feeding Everyone No Matter What: Managing Food Security After Global Catastrophe, Academic Press (2015).
- Create, Share, and Save Money Using Open-Source Projects. McGraw-Hill Education TAB (2020).
- Lonny Grafman and Joshua Pearce. To Catch the Sun, Cal Poly Humboldt University Press. (2021).
  - Capter Le Solei
  - Atrapando El Sol
