= Endzeit =

Endzeit may refer to:

- End time (disambiguation)
- Endzeit Bunkertracks
