= Crazy P =

English electronic music group

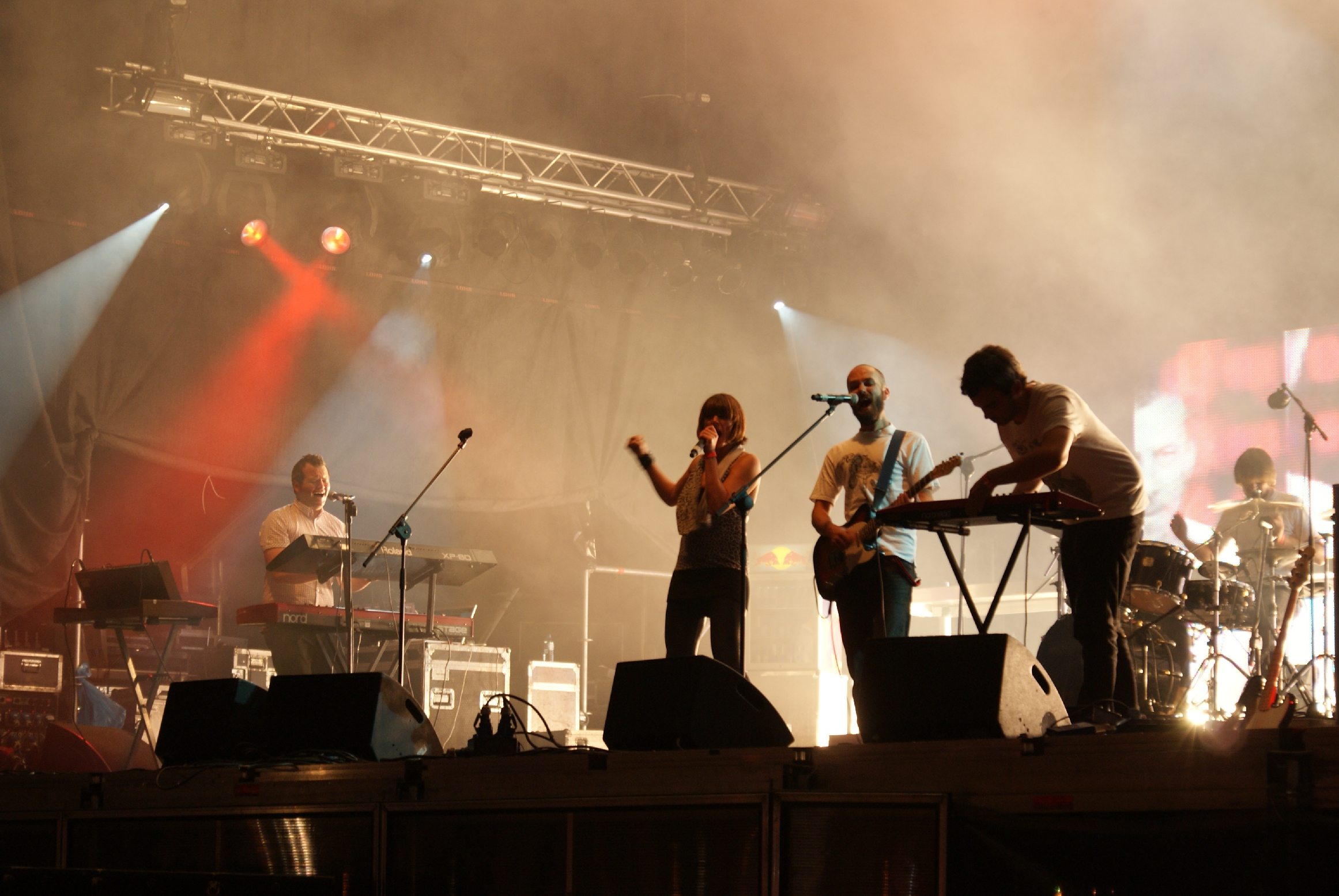
- Audioriver Festival 2009, Płock, Poland

Background information
- Also known as: Crazy Penis
- Origin: Nottingham, United Kingdom
- Genres: Disco, deep house, funk, downtempo
- Years active: 1995–present
- Labels: 2020 Vision, Paper Recordings, Shiva Records, !K7
- Members: Chris Todd (Hot Toddy); James Baron (Ron Basejam); Tim Davies; Matt Klose
- Past members: Mav Kendricks; Danielle Moore (deceased)
- Website: https://crazy-p.com/

Crazy P (formerly known as Crazy Penis) is an English electronic music group, formed around 1995 by Chris Todd and Jim Baron.

== History ==
Todd and Baron formed the band after meeting at the University of Nottingham. The band's sound incorporates soul music, disco and house music. By 2002 the band expanded to include bassist Tim Davies, percussionist Mav Kendricks, and vocalist Danielle Moore. Todd explained the origin of the band name: "A flat mate of mine had a record called 'loco pinga' which roughly translates to Crazy Penis, we were going to call ourselves loco pinga but once we told people that, they liked crazy penis better for the shock value."

They were signed by Manchester label Paper Recordings and have since released six albums and several singles, starting with "Digging Deeper" in 1996. They built up a strong fanbase in Australia where they have toured several times.

Their track "There's a Better Place" samples the song "Pure Imagination" from the movie Willy Wonka & the Chocolate Factory.

Their track "Stop Space Return" was released as iTunes UK's single of the week on 28 October 2008.

The band began using 'Crazy P' exclusively in 2008 with Moore explaining "We wanted to grow, and keep growing, so there was no point in cutting our nose off to spite our face by keeping the original name."

The band's last album, Age of the Ego, was recorded in 2019. For the album, Moore wrote political themed lyrics which railed against the worship of high-profile politicians and celebrities, and also advocated for grassroots, community work, investment in the public sector and taxing billionaires and "people who have ravaged this country".

Moore, who still served as the group's frontwoman and who also wrote lyrics for some of Crazy P's songs, died on 30 August 2024, at the age of 52. The cause was suicide. She had been suffering from mental ill-health exacerbated by perimenopause

== Discography ==
=== Studio albums ===
- A Nice Hot Bath With... (1998)
- The Wicked is Music (2002)
- 24 Hour Psychedelic Freakout (2003)
- A Night on Earth (2005)
- Stop Space Return / Love on the Line (in Australia) (2008)
- When We On (2011)
- Walk Dance Talk Sing (2015)
- Age of the Ego (2019)
- Any Signs of Love (2024)

=== Live albums ===
- When We Live (2012)

=== Remix albums ===
- A Nice Hot Edit With..... (2011)
- Remixed (2013)

=== Remixes ===
Hot Toddy remixes

Year	Artist	Track	Title
2000	Easy Tiger	"Easy"	Hot Toddy Mix
2005	Crazy P	"Lady T"	
2005	Crazy P	"Sun Science"	
2006	Crazy P	"Can't Get Down"	Hot Toddy Mix
2008	Crazy P	"Lie Lost"	Hot Toddy Dub; Hot Toddy Remix
2008	Crazy P	"Never Gonna Reach Me"	
2008	Crazy P	"Stop Space Return"	Hot Toddy Mix
2008	Estelle featuring Kanye West	"American Boy"	Splice of Life Hot Toddy Dub
2008	Levi 5Star featuring Michelle Martinez	"Another You"	Hot Toddy Dub; Hot Toddy Remix
2008	NUfrequency featuring Snax	"Passage Of Time"	Hot Toddy Dub; Hot Toddy Remix
2010	D-Pulse	"Velocity of Love"	
2010	Fred Everything featuring N'Dea Davenport	"Don't Nobody"	Hot Toddy Remix; Hot Toddy Instrumental
2010	Joey Negro presents Kola Kube	"Why"	Hot Toddy Boogiefield Mix; Hot Toddy Club Mix; Hot Toddy Special Dub
2010	Lovebirds featuring Stee Downes	"Want You In My Soul"	
2010	Ron Basejam	"Spirit"	Hot Toddy Disco Dub; Hot Toddy Remix
2010	Smoke & Mirrors	"Set It Off"	Hot Toddy Instrumental; Hot Toddy Remix
2011	Alain Ho	"Into a Deep"	
2011	Black Dogs featuring Chantelle	"Love Underground"	
2011	Crazy P	"Open for Service"	
2011	J Boogie's Dubtronic Science featuring The Pimps of Joytime	"Go to Work"	
2012	Black Strobe	"Boogie in Zero Gravity"	
2012	Crazy P	"Changes"	
2012	Flash Atkins featuring Sally Garozzo	"Did You Forget to Shine?"	Hot Toddy Mix
2012	Mousse T.	"Brother on the Run"	
2012	Novika	"Miss Mood"	
2013	Dean Tyler featuring Dos Santos	"Ordinary Things"	
2013	Joey Negro and The Sunburst Band	"Taste the Groove"	
2013	Lonely Boy	"When I Think About"	
2013	Rhythm Plate featuring Frank H. Carter III	"Not Like That"	
2013	The Right Now	"Call Girl"	Hot Toddy Dub; Hot Toddy Mix
2014	Kraak & Smaak featuring John Turrell	"Back Again"	Hot Toddy Dub; Hot Toddy Remix
2014	Sugardaddy featuring Ronica	"Don't Look Any Further"	Hot Toddy Dub Remix; Hot Toddy Vocal Remix
2015	Crazy P	"Cruel Mistress"	Hot Toddy Retro Mix
2015	Crazy P	"Something More"	Hot Toddy Disco Redux; Hot Toddy Percky Dub
2015	Ilija Rudman	"Future Times"	
2015	Oh Yeah	"Nothing But the Beat"	Hot Toddy Dub Mix; Hot Toddy Vocal Mix
2015	Situation featuring Andre Espeut	"Get to Know Me"	Hot Toddy Dub Remix; Hot Toddy Vocal Remix
2017	Charles Schillings featuring Kuku	"Whatever Makes You Happy?"	Hot Toddy Remix
2017	Crazy P	"In My Hands"	Hot Toddy Remix
2017	Dutchican Soul featuring Andrea Love	"We Can Change the World"	Hot Toddy Psychedelic Dub; Hot Toddy Come Together Dub
2017	Izo FitzRoy	"Hope You Can Wait"	Hot Toddy Dub; Hot Toddy Remix
2017	Joey Negro	"Stomp Your Feet"	Hot Toddy Remix; Hot Toddy Underwater Dub
2017	Soul Clap featuring Nona Hendryx	"Shine (This Is It)"	Hot Toddy Marimba Message Dub Mix; Hot Toddy Marimba Message Vocal Mix
2018	Seamus Haji	"Last Night a DJ Saved My Life"	Hot Toddy Remix
