= The Wicked Is Music =

The Wicked is Music

Studio album by Crazy Penis
- Released: 2002
- Genre: Electronic, Downtempo, Deep House
- Label: Paper Recordings
- Producer: Crazy Penis

Crazy Penis chronology
A Nice Hot Bath With... (1999)	The Wicked is Music (2002)	24 Hour Psychedelic Freakout (2004)

The Wicked is Music is an album by Crazy Penis released in 2002. Cover photography was by Simon King.

== Track listing ==
1. "There's A Better Place!"
2. "You Started Something"
3. "Soulmutation"
4. "Keep On"
5. "Give It Up"
6. "You Are We"
7. "Change"
8. "Beautiful People"
9. "Bad Dismount"
10. "Mind Wide Open"
