= Chris Jennings =

Chris Jennings may refer to:

- Chris Jennings (gridiron football) (born 1983), gridiron football running back
- Chris Jennings (journalist), author of the books Paradise Now and End of Days
- Chris Jennings (musician) (born 1978), Canadian jazz double bassist, composer, arranger and educator
