= A Nice Hot Bath With... =

Studio album by Crazy Penis
- Released: 1999
- Recorded: 1998
- Genre: Electronic, Downtempo, Deep House
- Label: Paper Recordings
- Producer: Chris Todd, James Baron, Tim Davies

Crazy Penis chronology
A Nice Hot Bath With... (1999)	The Wicked is Music (2002)

A Nice Hot Bath With... is the name of a Crazy Penis album produced in 1999.

== Track listing ==
1. "Starwar" – 9:00
2. "Do It Good" – 8:56
3. "3 Play It Cool" – 6:25
4. "Omega Man" – 9:57
5. "Smoothin' Groovin'" – 9:01
6. "I Am Love" – 5:31
7. "Mambo" – 8:31
8. "A Little Something" – 5:26
9. "Drop Your Weapon" – 8:14
