= Alliance to Feed the Earth in Disasters =

NGO focused on resilient food sources

Alliance to Feed the Earth in Disasters (ALLFED)
- Formation: 2017
- Founder: David Denkenberger and Ray Taylor
- Website: https://allfed.info/

The Alliance to Feed the Earth in Disasters (ALLFED) is a nonprofit organization focused on to identifying, piloting, and preparing resilient food solutions to minimize the damage of a global catastrophe on the global food system. It also focuses on helping governments and communities implementing these solutions through the implementation of policies, preparedness plans, and investments.

ALLFED was co-founded in 2017 by David Denkenberger, co-author of Feeding Everyone No Matter What and Ray Taylor. It researches resilient food solutions such as fungi, seaweed, single-cell proteins, and leaf protein concentrate.

== History ==
As of Spring 2025, ALLFED faced a “major funding gap” according to GivingWhatWeCan.
