= Night on Earth (disambiguation) =

Night on Earth is a 1991 film directed by Jim Jarmusch.

Night on Earth may also refer to:

- Night on Earth (TV series), a British nature documentary
- Night on Earth (soundtrack), the soundtrack album from the Jarmusch film, written by Tom Waits
- Night on Earth (Dawn of Relic album), 2005
- Night on Earth (Rialto album), 2001
- A Night on Earth, an album by Crazy Penis

== See also ==
- Last Night on Earth (disambiguation)
