= EOD =

EOD, EoD, or Eod may refer to:

- Earth Overshoot Day, in humanity's consumption of resources
- Electric organ discharge, by electric fish
- End of data, a control character in telecommunications
- End of day, in business
- End of days (disambiguation)
- Esoteric Order of Dagon, a fictional cult in the Cthulhu mythos of H. P. Lovecraft
- Eves of Destruction, a Canadian roller derby team
- Evolution of Dance, dance performance video by Judson Laipply
- Explosive ordnance disposal, bomb disposal etc. by the military
