= Open-Source Lab (book) =

Book on development of open source laboratory hardware by Joshua Pearce

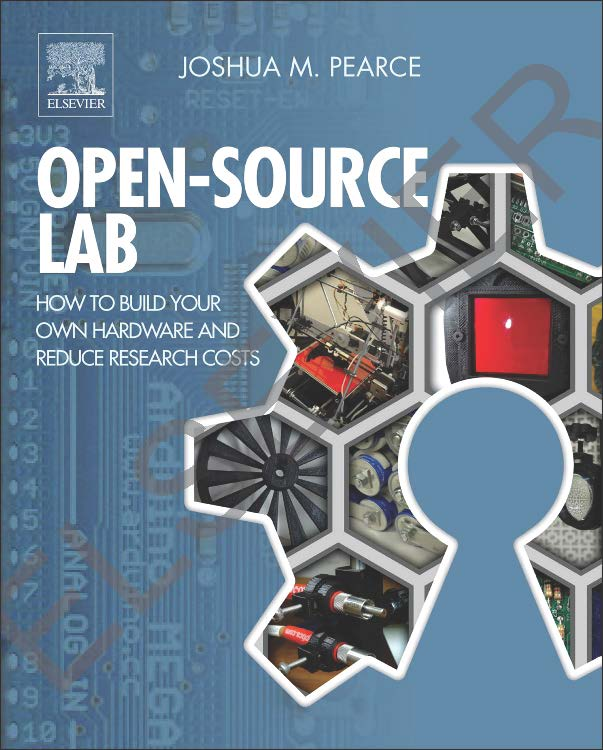
- Author: Joshua M. Pearce
- Language: English
- Subject: Do it yourself; Open-source hardware; Research
- Publisher: Elsevier
- Publication date: November 7, 2013
- Publication place: United States
- Media type: Print
- Pages: 271
- ISBN: 978-0124104624 (hardcover)
- OCLC: 880668233
- Dewey Decimal: 681/.750285
- LC Class: Q185 .P43 2014

The Open-Source Lab: How to Build Your Own Hardware and Reduce Research Costs by Joshua M. Pearce was published in 2014 by Elsevier.

The academic book is a guide, which details the development of free and open-source hardware primarily for scientists and university faculty. It provides step-by-step instructions on building laboratory hardware and scientific instruments. It also provides instructions on digital design sharing, Arduino microcontrollers, RepRap 3D Printers for scientific use and how to use open-source hardware licenses. The Guardian discusses how ideas in the Open-Source Lab could enable 3D printing to offer developing-world scientists savings on replica lab kits. The Open-Source Lab book has been covered extensively by the media. It was one of the top books chosen by Shareable for "New Books About Sharing, Cities and Happiness".

The book itself is not open source and is sold under copyright by Elsevier.

== Claims ==
The author claims the method enables researchers in every discipline to develop research tools at low costs following his previous research in open-source hardware published in Science. These claims have been generally supported by others using the techniques, such as those in the DIYbio community. While discussing the book in an interview with 3-D Printing Industry, Pearce has claimed to save thousands of dollars in his own lab, and his various studies on the economics of printing lab equipment, such as a PLOS ONE article on open-source optics have generally found over 90% savings. A study on the use of 3D printing in this context cited this book as also being good for the environment.

== Chapters ==
1. Introduction to Open-Source Hardware for Science
2. The Benefits of Sharing—Nice Guys and Girls do Finish First
3. Open Licensing—Advanced Sharing
4. Open-Source Microcontrollers for Science: How to Use, Design Automated Equipment With and Troubleshoot
5. RepRap for Science—How to Use, Design, and Troubleshoot the Self-Replicating 3-D Printer
6. Digital Designs and Scientific Hardware
7. The Future of Open-Source Hardware and Science

== Uptake ==
Copies of Open-Source Lab were a prize in an Instructables "Build My Lab" Contest sponsored by Tekla Labs.

== See also ==
- List of open-source hardware projects
- Open-notebook science, an open science technique
