= Stop Space Return =

Studio album by Crazy P
- Released: 2008
- Genre: Electronic, house, downtempo
- Label: 2020Vision
- Producer: Crazy P

Crazy P chronology
A Night on Earth (2005)	Stop Space Return (2008)	When We On (2011)

Stop Space Return is a Crazy P album produced in 2008. It is an update of the Australia-only album Love on the Line (see below), with four new tracks.

== Track listing ==
1. "Stop Space Return"
2. "Lie Lost"
3. "Caught Up"
4. "Never Gonna Reach Me"
5. "In & Out"
6. "Love on the Line"
7. "Give a Little"
8. "Wishing For"
9. "Too Far"
10. "Fascination"
11. "Over to You"
12. "Say Goodbye"

The cover design was done by Richard Robinson.

== Love on the Line ==
Love on the Line is the name of a Crazy Penis album produced in 2008, released only in Australia.

=== Track listing ===
1. "Too Far"
2. "Love on the Line"
3. "Fascination"
4. "Never Gonna Reach Me"
5. "Look Me Up"
6. "Give a Little"
7. "Is It Ever Enough?"
8. "Caught Up"
9. "Lie Lost"
10. "Say Goodbye"
