= When We On =

Studio album by Crazy P
- Released: 2011
- Genre: Electronic, house, downtempo
- Length: 1:09:58
- Label: 2020 Vision
- Producer: Crazy P

Crazy P chronology
Stop Space Return (2008)	When We On (2011)

When We On is a Crazy P album produced in 2011.

== Track listing ==
1. "Open For Service" - 6:47
2. "Changes" - 5:37
3. "Beatbox" - 7:59
4. "The Unbearable Lightness of Being" - 4:28
5. "Heartbreaker" - 5:27
6. "Twisted" - 9:12
7. "Sonar" - 6:09
8. "Your Dark Energy" - 6:02
9. "Eruption" - 6:05
10. "Wecanonlybewhoweare" - 6:12
11. "Future Beat" - 5:55
