= Last days (disambiguation) =

Last days is the time period described by the eschatology of various religions.

Last Day or Last Days may also refer to:

== Books ==
- The Last Days (Rosenberg novel), a 2003 novel by Joel C. Rosenberg
- The Last Days (Westerfeld novel), a 2006 novel by Scott Westerfeld
- The Last Days (Masterson novel), a 1998 novel by Andrew Masterson
- Last Days (Evenson novel), a 2009 novel by Brian Evenson
- Last Days (Nevill novel), a 2012 novel by Adam Nevill
- Latter Days (comics), a graphic novel by Dave Sim, and the last in the Cerebus collection series, whose second half is called The Last Day
- The Last Day, a 2008 novel by John Ramsay Miller
- The Last Day, a 2020 novel by Andrew Hunter Murray
- The Last Day (novel) (Y Dydd Olaf), a 1968 science fiction novel by Owain Owain

== Film ==
- Last Day (film), a 1952 Spanish crime film directed by Antonio Román
- The Last Day (1972 film), a 1972 Soviet drama film
- The Last Day (1975) a film produced by A. C. Lyles
- The Last Days, a 1998 documentary film directed by James Moll
- The Last Day (2004 film), a French film directed by Rodolphe Marconi
- Last Days (2005 film), a 2005 film directed by Gus Van Sant
- The Last Days (2013 film), the English title of Los Últimos Días, a 2013 Spanish post-apocalyptic film
- Last Days (2014 film), a 2014 short film directed by Kathryn Bigelow
- Last Days (2025 film), a 2025 American biographical drama film about John Allen Chau
- The Last Day (2026 film), a 2026 American drama film

== Television ==
- "Last Days" (Sliders), a 1995 episode
- "Lastday", the last day of a person's life in the film Logan's Run
- "The Last Day" (Red Dwarf), a 1989 episode of sci-fi sitcom Red Dwarf
- "The Last Day" (Doctor Who), a 2013 mini-episode of sci-fi series Doctor Who
- "The Last Day" (Arthur), a 2016 episode
- "The Last Day" (The Vampire Diaries), a 2011 episode
- "The Last Day" (Brooklyn Nine-Nine), the 2021 two-part finale
- "The Last Day" (Agents of S.H.I.E.L.D.), a 2018 episode
- "The Last Day" (ThunderCats), a 1988 episode

== Music ==
- "Lastday", a song by Star One from Victims of the Modern Age
- "Last Day" (song), a 2009 song by Editors
- "Last Day", a song by Silver Sun from the 1997 album Silver Sun
- "Last Day" (featuring The Lox), a song by The Notorious B.I.G. from Life After Death
- "Der letzte Tag" (Tokio Hotel song) (The Last Day), a 2006 song by Tokio Hotel

== See also ==
- End of the world (disambiguation)
- End time (disambiguation)
