= Agrifood systems =

Systems of types of food production

Agrifood systems encompass the primary production of food and non-food agricultural products, as well as in food storage, aggregation, post-harvest handling, transportation, processing, distribution, marketing, disposal and consumption. Within agrifood systems, food systems comprise all food products that originate from crop and livestock production, forestry, fisheries and aquaculture, and from other sources such as synthetic biology, and that are intended for human consumption. Agrifood systems include all the activities and sectors linked to food and non-food agricultural commodities from production to disposal.

A conceptual framework for agrifood systems, from The State of Food and Agriculture 2021. Making agrifood systems more resilient to shocks and stresses, In brief

Agrifood systems have three main components:

1. primary production, which includes food from agricultural and non-agricultural origins, as well as non-food agricultural products that serve as inputs to other industries;
2. food distribution that links production to consumption through food supply chains and domestic food transport networks. Food supply chains include all actors and activities involved in post-harvest handling, storage, aggregation, transport, processing, distribution and marketing of food; and
3. household consumption, which is the downstream outcome of functioning agrifood systems, subject to varying degrees of demand shocks, such as loss of income, depending on the proportion of vulnerable groups in the population. The higher this proportion, the more difficult it is to protect food security and nutrition from shocks.

Employment in agrifood systems by region

The world's agrifood systems comprise a gargantuan global enterprise that each year produces approximately 11 billion tonnes of food and a multitude of non-food products, including 32 million tonnes of natural fibres and 4 billion m^{3} of wood. The estimated gross value of agricultural output in 2018 was US$3.5 trillion.

Agrifood systems employment represented 39.1% of global employment in 2022, down from 52.2% in 2000. In 2021 primary production alone provides about one-quarter of all employment globally, more than half in sub-Saharan Africa and almost 60 percent in low-income countries. Including middle and downstream segments – from food storage and processing to transportation, retailing and consumption – agrifood systems are the backbone of many economies. Even in the European Union, the food and beverage industry employs more people than any other manufacturing sector.FAO approximates that 1.23 billion people are employed globally in agrifood systems, amounting to about one-third of the global labor force.

Share of agrifood systems employment in total employment by region

The 2024 edition of the FAO report The State of Food and Agriculture 2024 adopts an agrifood systems typology with six categories – protracted crisis, traditional, expanding, diversifying, formalizing and industrial – to reveal that different systems face unique challenges and require targeted interventions. The typology uses a set of four variables, comprising agricultural value added per worker, number of supermarkets per capita, diet diversity, and urbanization. It is based on the food systems typology developed by Marshall et al. (2021) with the aim to offer a distinct classification of countries based on various aspects of their national agrifood systems, serving as a valuable addition to context-specific studies. The FAO typology adds the category for protracted crises to address the major disruptions caused by prolonged conflicts and vulnerabilities in agrifood systems, following the designation made in the "Global Report on Food Crises."

== Challenges ==
=== Hunger and malnutrition ===
Hunger is increasing, and more so in countries affected by conflict, climate extremes and economic downturns, and with high income inequality. The magnitude and severity of food crises also worsened in 2020 as protracted conflict, the economic fallout of the COVID-19 pandemic and weather extremes exacerbated pre-existing fragilities. Economic downturns in 2020, including those resulting from COVID-19 restrictions, delivered the hardest blow in decades to those suffering from hunger, increasing the number of undernourished people by 118 million in 2020 alone and illustrating the devastating impact of a shock that occurs alongside existing vulnerabilities. According to Béné et al. (2020), there is little evidence of reduced food supply (beyond initial disruptions due to panic buying), which may be attributable to government exemptions for the agrifood sector. However, lockdowns and other mobility restrictions drastically reduced the movement of people and goods, which impacted livelihoods. Loss of income and purchasing power sharply reduced the food security and nutrition of billions of people, particularly in low-income and middle-income countries. Families were forced to shift consumption to cheaper, less nutritious foods at a time when they needed to protect and strengthen their immune system. Reduced access to nutritious food and a shift to low-quality and energy-dense diets triggered by the economic impacts of the COVID-19 pandemic, also risk increasing the levels of overweight and obesity in almost all regions of the world. Adult obesity is on the rise with no reversal in the trend at global or regional level for more than 15 years, increasing the non-communicable diseases associated with those forms of malnutrition.

=== Demographic and environmental pressures ===
Greenhouse gas emissions from agrifood systems (2023)

To feed a world population forecast to reach 9.7 billion in 2050, FAO estimates that agriculture may need to produce 40–54 percent more food, feed and biofuel feedstock than in 2012, depending on the scenario. Urbanization and greater affluence are shifting diets in many low-income and middle-income countries towards increased consumption of more resource-intensive animal source and processed food. If those trends continue, by 2030, diet-related health costs linked to non-communicable diseases will exceed US$1.3 trillion a year, while the annual cost of associated greenhouse gas (GHG) emissions will exceed US$1.7 trillion.

World greenhouse gas emissions from agrifood systems

This increased food demand is compounded by shocks and stresses, including more frequent and intense extreme and slow-onset events due to climate change, which threaten both agricultural production – crops, livestock, aquaculture, fisheries and forestry – and the middle and downstream stages of agrifood systems. But as agrifood systems are affected by climate shocks and stresses, they are themselves a major driver of climate change.

=== Hidden costs ===
Recent studies aimed at measuring and valuing the hidden costs of agrifood systems have used True Cost Accounting (TCA), an accounting approach that measures and values the hidden impacts of economic activities on the environment, society and health. These impacts are regarded as hidden because they are not reflected in the market prices of products and services, i.e. not included in the operational profit and loss accounts.

Quantified hidden costs of agrifood systems by cost category (left) and subcategory (right), 2020

The scope of these studies differs depending on the research question being addressed, the geographical coverage and the hidden impacts to be included in the analysis. There are many hidden impacts and some are difficult to measure or quantify. For example, environmental externalities such GHG emissions are easy to include in any TCA analysis due to a wide availability of relevant data. However, the hidden impacts related to human and social capitals might be more difficult to find. Examples include impacts on working conditions (human capital) and cultural identity (social capital).

In 2019, a study by the World Bank estimated the hidden costs of foodborne diseases (from unsafe food) in low and middle-income countries and found these to amount to USD 95.2 billion.

Diets low in whole grains and fruits and high in sodium are the leading dietary risks contributing to global health hidden costs

Three other studies have attempted to estimate the hidden costs of global agrifood systems. FOLU (2019) estimated them at USD 12 trillion, while Hendricks et al (2023) estimated them at USD 19 trillion. However, the latter, acknowledges the uncertainly in the estimate and concludes that the value would be between USD 7.2 trillion and USD 51.8 trillion. The third estimate in the 2023 edition of the FAO report: The State of Food and Agriculture estimates global hidden costs from agrifood systems to be USD 12.7 trillion. This study also acknowledges the uncertainty in the estimate. The FAO report shows the global value of the hidden costs has a 95 percent chance of being at least USD 10.8 trillion and a 5 percent chance of being at least USD 16 trillion. Differently from the other two studies, the FAO report assesses hidden costs of agrifood systems at the national level for 154 countries. It states these national numbers are consistent and comparable covering the major dimensions (i.e. environmental, health and social) of agrifood system hidden costs, allowing not only comparison across countries, but also across the different dimensions.

Following up on the 2023 edition of the FAO report – The State of Food and Agriculture – the subsequent edition provides a detailed breakdown of the hidden costs associated with unhealthy dietary patterns that lead to non-communicable diseases for 156 countries. The report finds that in 2020, global health hidden costs amounted 8.1 trillion 2020 PPP dollars, 70 percent of all of the hidden costs of agrifood systems. Diets low in whole grains are the leading concern (18 percent of global quantified health hidden costs), alongside diets high in sodium and low in fruits (16 percent each), although there is significant variation across countries.

== Resilience of agrifood systems ==
The resilience of agrifood systems refers to the capacity over time of agrifood systems, in the face of any disruption, to sustainably ensure availability of and access to sufficient, safe and nutritious food for all, and sustain the livelihoods of agrifood systems' actors. According to FAO, truly resilient agrifood systems must have a robust capacity to prevent, anticipate, absorb, adapt and transform in the face of any disruption, with the functional goal of ensuring food security and nutrition for all and decent livelihoods and incomes for agrifood systems' actors. Such resilience addresses all dimensions of food security, but focuses specifically on stability of access and sustainability, which ensure food security in both the short and the long term.

=== Defining agrifood systems resilience ===
The resilience of agrifood systems builds on the concept of resilience, which originated in the study of ecosystems and evolved over 50 years into an object of study across an array of disciplines, including engineering, agriculture, economics and psychology. Although there is little agreement today as to a precise definition across disciplines, broadly speaking, resilience can be defined as the dynamic capacity to continue to achieve goals despite disturbances.

In a call for cross-sectoral collaboration to prevent, anticipate, absorb, adapt and transform in the face of shocks and stresses across all sectors of society, the United Nations has developed and adopted the UN Common Guidance on Helping Build Resilient Societies. Since there is a wide variety of risks relating to understanding resilience, the UN offers the following definition: "the ability of individuals, households, communities, cities, institutions, systems and societies to prevent, anticipate, absorb, adapt, and transform positively, efficiently and effectively when faced with a wide range of risks, while maintaining an acceptable level of functioning and without compromising long-term prospects for sustainable development, peace and security, human rights and well-being for all." Resilience building is a system-wide multi-risk, multi-actor and multisectoral effort.

In 2021, FAO released the first definition of agrifood systems and agrifood systems' resilience in The State of Food and Agriculture 2021 – Making agrifood systems more resilient to shocks and stresses. The definition of agrifood systems' resilience is adapted from Tendall et al.'s definition of food system resilience, which is "capacity over time of a food system and its units at multiple levels, to provide sufficient, appropriate and accessible food to all, in the face of various and even unforeseen disturbances". Agrifood systems are broader than food systems, as these encompass the entire range of actors and their interlinked value-adding activities in the primary production of food and non-food agricultural products, as well as in food storage, aggregation, post-harvest handling, transportation, processing, distribution, marketing, disposal and consumption.

=== Disruptions to agrifood systems ===
Agrifood systems are exposed to shocks and stresses of various types that differ in nature and intensity, including those impair agrifood systems by disrupting the operations of related institutions, supply chains and actors. Agrifood markets are operating in an era marked by recurrent, increasingly severe and overlapping shocks, including extreme weather events, conflicts, pandemics, financial crises, disease outbreaks, and sharp increases in energy and agricultural input prices. These shocks have disrupted production, trade flows and markets, exposing vulnerabilities across food supply chains. In a highly interconnected global economy, disruptions originating in one region can rapidly propagate across borders, affecting food availability, affordability and accessibility far beyond the location of the initial shock.

==== Shocks ====
Shocks are short-term deviations from long-term trends that have substantial negative effects on a system, people's state of well-being, assets, livelihoods, safety and ability to withstand future shocks. Shocks impacting on agrifood systems may be covariate (an event that directly affects groups of households, communities, regions or even entire countries) or idiosyncratic (an event that affects individuals or households) and include disasters, extreme climate events, biological and technological events, surges in plant and animal diseases and pests, socio-economic crises and conflicts.

==== Stresses ====
Stresses are long-term trends or pressures that undermine the stability of a system and increase vulnerability within it. Stresses can result from natural resource degradation, urbanization, demographic pressure, climate variability, political instability or economic decline.

==== How shocks and stresses affect agrifood systems ====
The same shock or stress may have different impacts across the different components of agrifood systems, depending on their characteristics, risk environments, and inherent vulnerabilities and capacities. For example, given its reliance on natural processes, the agriculture sector is disproportionately exposed and vulnerable to adverse climate-related events, especially droughts, floods and storms. Over half of all shocks to crop production are the result of extreme weather events, reinforcing concern about the vulnerability of arable systems to climatic and meteorological volatility. In aquatic systems, there are well-established linkages between harvesting of fish, ocean productivity and global meteorology. Global climate plays a major role in fluctuating fishery productivity.

Because agrifood systems are dependent on agricultural and natural ecosystems and encompass numerous actors along several interlinked components – from production to consumption – a shock or stress, impacting on any component, will not only affect the actors in it but will spread throughout systems upstream or downstream, eventually impacting on many if not all other actors and components.

Coping mechanisms and resilience to shocks and stressors are shaped by gender inequalities, and shocks and crises have a greater negative impact on women's livelihoods in agrifood systems than they do on men's. During the COVID-19 pandemic, women's food insecurity rose faster than men's, and job losses in both primary agricultural production and off-farm segments of the agrifood systems were much more pronounced for women than for men. Women were called on to draw down their more limited assets and savings more quickly than were men.

=== Elements for resilience ===
Resilience-building involves a mix of prevention, anticipation, and the capacity to absorb, adapt, and transform following a disruption. Policies and investments that reduce poverty, generate decent employment and expand access to education and basic services, as well as social protection programmes when needed, are essential building blocks of resilience.

==== Diverse food sourcing ====
Diverse sourcing of food, such as through international trade, is a key strategy for building agrifood systems' resilience because it buffers the food supply against shocks and stresses. The volume of agrifood trade more than doubled between 2000 and 2024. Although international trade buffers against domestic shocks, it increases exposure to external shocks and can itself become a channel of shock transmission, therefore having diverse international trade partners is key. Enhancing diversity in terms of commodities is also essential for ensuring the supply of food necessary for healthy diets. However, evidence on the diversity of food supply in terms of domestic production, imports and stocks reveal that the potential of international trade is not equally well exploited in all countries. Low-income countries, such as in sub-Saharan Africa, are among those with the lowest diversity of imports as the food supply is mostly determined by what is produced for the domestic market.

==== Diverse food supply chain types ====
A mix of traditional, transitional and modern food supply chains can help buffer shocks and stresses of different types because the vulnerabilities and resilience capacities of food supply chains are shaped largely by their structural characteristics and product attributes:

- traditional chains are spatially short, involve a small number of local intermediaries, but lack product diversification, quality and safety standards, and economies of scale;
- transitional supply chains are spatially longer, with many small and medium agrifood enterprises (SMAEs) handling midstream processing and distribution;
- modern chains, which supply large urban populations mainly with horticultural and animal products, are dominated by multinationals in their midstream and downstream segments.

The limited resources available to small-scale producers and small and medium agrifood enterprises (SMAEs) often make recovery following a disruption more difficult. SMAEs tend to be labour-intensive with limited capacity to manage risks associated with product perishability and seasonality. Being heavily interdependent, disruption anywhere in the supply chain can produce a harmful cascading effect. FAO suggests that facilitating access to credit and information can create synergies between efficiency and resilience that accelerate recovery. Governments can also support better coordination and organization of SMAEs within food supply chains. One approach is to form consortia, which increase the scale, visibility and influence of small businesses and facilitate access to private and government funding. Nurturing inter-organizational relationships in networks or strategic alliances can generate relational, structural and cognitive capital, promote more robust and effective risk management through resource pooling, and improve access to modern technologies and know-how. Territorial development tools such as clusters can also ease credit constraints, facilitate human development programmes and the diffusion of digital technologies.

==== Robust transport networks ====
According to FAO, robust transport networks can prevent or limit increases in travel time – and consequent impacts on food costs – when an adverse event limits or prevents access to critical network links. For example, flooding, whether from flash floods or from longer-term stagnant flooding, reduces the connectivity of any transport network, impacting the movement of people, goods and societal functioning in general. Damage from flooding can indirectly affect larger areas for a longer period of time, such as when there are traffic delays and congestion on alternative routes, increased journey distances/durations, increased fuel consumption and associated greenhouse gas (GHG) emissions. Due to climate change, transport networks are increasingly being exposed to extreme weather events. A study on the transport networks of 90 countries finds that where food is transported more locally and where the network is denser – such as in high-income countries and densely populated countries like China, India, Nigeria and Pakistan –, systematic disturbances have a much lower impact. Conversely, low-income countries have much lower levels of transport network resilience, although some exceptions exist. The study further simulates the effect of potential disruptions – namely floods – to food transport networks which illustrate that the loss of network connectivity that results when links become impassable potentially affects millions of people.

==== Affordable healthy diets ====
Despite disruptions, a 2021 study by FAO highlights that agrifood systems need to continuously guarantee access to food for all. In addition to the nearly 3 billion people in 2019 who could not afford a healthy diet that protects against malnutrition in all its forms, an additional 1 billion people (mostly on lower- and upper-middle-income countries) are at risk of not affording a healthy diet if a shock were to reduce their income by a third. FAO suggests that low-income countries in dire need of improving the affordability of healthy diets should focus on adopting long-term approaches that improve income levels and lower the cost of nutritious foods. In middle-income countries with many at risk, building resilience through the stabilization of incomes and diversification of agrifood systems should be the focus instead. Social protection programmes can also be effective policy tools during times of crisis but should be designed with the key challenges in mind.

Reyes et al. (2021) reviewed 12 global nutrition initiatives and found significant overlap in recommendations for a healthier food system. Their thematic analysis identified the following 13 different action themes, which are not necessarily mutually exclusive:

1. Prioritize agricultural production of a diverse range of nutrient-rich foods;
2. Protect nutrient-rich wild foods and species-rich ecosystems on land and in oceans;
3. Support connectivity of smallholders and Small and Medium Sized Enterprises (SMEs) across food value chains;
4. Redesign safety net/social protection programs towards improved nutritional outcome;
5. Reduce food loss and food waste;
6. Improve food quality and safety;
7. Strengthen regulations for advertising and marketing;
8. Improve transparency in food labeling;
9. Encourage healthier eating through subsidies and promotions of healthy foods and taxes on unhealthy foods;
10. Create consumer demand for healthy foods (nutrition education & civic engagement);
11. Improve acceptability of healthy foods;
12. Promote traditional foods and methods that impart nutritional benefits;
13. Invest in metrics, research, and access to inform policy development.

==== Anticipatory action ====
Anticipatory action is a growing area of disaster management that relies on data analysis to predict where crises might strike and act ahead of time to protect the assets and agency of farmers, fishers and herders to prepare them for widely different circumstances and contexts. An anticipatory action system involves crisis timelines, early warning systems, anticipatory actions, flexible financing and evidence. Risk-informed and shock-responsive social protection systems to provide support not only to routine beneficiaries, but also at-risk and crisis-prone populations. They can expand the provision of benefits according to the emerging needs of potential beneficiaries and enable them to invest and engage in productive activities. There is a growing body of evidence pointing towards the positive impact of anticipatory action, yet it is often fragmented, incomplete in scope, and in need of methodological improvements.

==== Improved basic and primary services ====
Improved education, non-farm employment and cash transfers will be key in building capacities to absorb, adapt and transform by rural low-income households, in particular small-scale producers whose livelihoods are increasingly vulnerable to climate shocks and depletion of natural resources. For rural households, FAO's resilience index measurement and analysis (RIMA) model finds that in 23 countries indicate that education, income diversification and cash transfers mainly drove gradual improvements in resilience capacity. Analysis of another 12 countries showed that in more than half of cases, the most important pillar of resilience was access to productive and non-productive assets. Also important to household resilience was adaptive capacity, which depended critically on education and human capacity development within the household. Access to basic services, such as improved sanitation and safe drinking water, and primary services, especially schools, hospitals and agricultural markets, provided important support to household resilience, particularly in very arid zones and in pastoralist households.

==== Sustainable agriculture and food production ====
Adopting more sustainable production practices is another important resilience-enhancing strategy. Moving towards more sustainable agriculture and food production involves protecting nature; restoring and rehabilitating natural environments; and sustainably managing food production systems. Agroecology is one approach that can help producers adapt to and mitigate climate change and there is increasing evidence of its benefits for the environment, biodiversity, farmers' incomes, adaptation to climate change, and resilience to multiple shocks and stresses. Climate-smart agriculture (CSA) is another resilience-enhancing approach, which aims to promote food security, resilient livelihoods and climate-resilient agriculture. It is an integrated approach to managing landscapes – cropland, livestock, forests and fisheries – that address the interlinked challenges of food security and climate change. Additionally, significant reductions in food loss and waste, better resource-use efficiency and trade have an important role, as imports may be needed to fill domestic deficits where there are natural resource constraints.

== Sources ==
This article incorporates text from a free content work. Licensed under CC BY 4.0 (license statement/permission). Text taken from The State of Agricultural Commodity Markets 2026, Food and Agriculture Organization of the United Nations.

This article incorporates text from a free content work. Licensed under CC BY-SA 3.0 (license statement/permission). Text taken from The status of women in agrifood systems – Overview, FAO.

This article incorporates text from a free content work. Licensed under CC BY-SA 3.0 (license statement/permission). Text taken from The State of Food and Agriculture 2021. Making agrifood systems more resilient to shocks and stresses, In brief, FAO.

This article incorporates text from a free content work. Licensed under CC BY-SA 3.0 (license statement/permission). Text taken from Robust transport networks support agrifood systems' resilience, FAO, FAO.

This article incorporates text from a free content work. Licensed under CC BY-SA 3.0 (license statement/permission). Text taken from Ensuring economic access to healthy diets during times of crisis, FAO, FAO.

This article incorporates text from a free content work. Licensed under CC BY-SA 3.0 (license statement/permission). Text taken from International trade and the resilience of national agrifood systems, FAO, FAO.

This article incorporates text from a free content work. Licensed under CC BY-SA 3.0 (license statement/permission). Text taken from The State of Food Security and Nutrition in the World 2021. Transforming food systems for food security, improved nutrition and affordable healthy diets for all, In brief, FAO, IFAD, UNICEF, WFP and WHO, FAO.

This article incorporates text from a free content work. Licensed under CC BY 4.0 (license statement/permission). Text taken from In Brief to The State of Food and Agriculture 2024, FAO, FAO.

This article incorporates text from a free content work. Licensed under CC BY 4.0 (license statement/permission). Text taken from World Food and Agriculture – Statistical Yearbook 2025, Food and Agriculture Organization of the United Nations.

== See also ==
- Agriculture
- Food security
- Food industry
- Food system
- Supply chain resilience
- Ecological resilience
- Climate resilience
- Soil resilience
