= End Times (book) =

2019 book by Bryan Walsh

- First edition
- Author: Bryan Walsh
- Language: English
- Subject: Science; Human extinction
- Genre: Non-fiction
- Publisher: Hachette Books
- Publication date: 27 August 2019
- Publication place: United States
- Pages: 416
- ISBN: 9780316449601

End Times: A Brief Guide to the End of the World is a 2019 non-fiction book by journalist Bryan Walsh. The book discusses various risks of human extinction, including asteroids, volcanoes, nuclear war, global warming, pathogens, biotech, AI, and extraterrestrial intelligence. The book includes interviews with astronomers, anthropologists, biologists, climatologists, geologists, and other scholars. The book advocates strongly for greater action.

== Ideas ==
Walsh opens with the Derek Parfit argument that there is an "unimaginably enormous" moral interest in safeguarding the countless potential future generations against existential risk. Walsh discusses how the Shoemaker-Levy 9 comet's widely followed collision with Jupiter motivated increased government action on tracking near-earth objects, and strikes a hopeful tone that other risks can similarly be effectively addressed. On nuclear war, Walsh states "I'm much more scared of nuclear war than I am of global warming because nuclear war can be instant climate change". In the aftermath of a hypothetical nuclear winter, farming might be impossible; Walsh discusses a "mushroom cultivation" solution which he credits to David Denkenberger's 2014 Feeding Everyone No Matter What. Mushrooms can convert indigestible cellulose into edible food, as can rat farming. Walsh calculates a 36-by-4-inch (90-by-10-cm) log could yield two pounds of mushroom in four years; if the post-disaster global population were sufficiently small anyway, Walsh judges such farming might be feasible while waiting for the sunlight to eventually return. In addition, ground-up leaves could provide vitamin C. Walsh also notes that cannibalism would not provide a sustainable food source.

Walsh also argues that cognitive biases prevent people from giving sufficient attention to existential risks.

== Reception ==
Reviewing the book in Science, Seth Baum of the Global Catastrophic Risk Institute stated "Among the crowded collection of books on threats to humanity, End Times offers an excellent general-purpose introduction". Kirkus Reviews called the book "fascinating and frightening" and said it contained "compelling" solutions. In contrast, Publishers Weekly judges that the book contains "very few clear answers".

The book was included in Nature among "five of the week's best science picks", and also made the August 2019 "Best Books" list by Time magazine.

== See also ==
- Why The Future Doesn't Need Us (2000)
- Our Final Hour (2003)
- The Precipice: Existential Risk and the Future of Humanity (2019)
