= Last Night on Earth =

Last Night on Earth may refer to:

- "Last Night on Earth" (song), a single by U2 from their 1997 album Pop
- "Last Night on Earth", a song by Delta Goodrem from her 2004 album Mistaken Identity
- "Last Night on Earth", a song by Green Day from their 2009 album 21st Century Breakdown
- Last Night on Earth: Live in Tokyo, a 2009 live EP by Green Day
- "Last Night on Earth", a song by Lemaitre from their 2016 EP Afterglow
- "Last Night On Earth", a song by Ava Max from her 2023 album Diamonds & Dancefloors
- Last Night on Earth (Noah and the Whale album), 2011
- Last Night on Earth (Lee Ranaldo album), 2013
- Last Night on Earth (Finger Eleven album), 2025
- Last Night on Earth (Finger Eleven song) a single by Finger Eleven from their 2025 of the same name
- Last Night on Earth: The Zombie Game, a survival horror board game
- "Last Night on Earth", a song by Powerman 5000 from their album Korea Tour EP

== See also ==
- Batman: Last Knight on Earth, a DC Black Label comic book limited series
- Night on Earth (disambiguation)
