= End time =

End time, End times, or Endtime may refer to:

== Religion ==
- Eschatology, beliefs concerning the final events of history or the destiny of humanity
- Endtime Ministries, a Christian organization

== Music ==
- End Time (Freakwater album), 1999
- End Time (Brutal Truth album), 2011
- End Times (album), a 2010 album by the Eels
- "Endtime", a song by Katatonia from the album Brave Murder Day
- "End Times", song by the Eels from End Times
- "End Times", song by Ghostpoet from Dark Days + Canapés

== Other works ==
- End Times (book), a 2019 exploration of human extinction risk by Bryan Walsh
- "End Times" (Breaking Bad), a 2011 television episode
- End Times, a photographic series by Jill Greenberg
- End Times: Elites, Counter-Elites, and the Path of Political Disintegration, a 2023 book by Peter Turchin

== See also ==
- End of days (disambiguation)
- End of the world (disambiguation)
- Last days (disambiguation)
