= Charles Schillings =

Belgian House DJ, based in France

- Origin: Belgium
- Genres: house
- Labels: Pschent Music
- Website: MySpace

Charles Schillings is a Belgian House DJ, based in France. He has worked with Pschent Music since 1996.

== Biography ==
Charles Schillings is known for mixing eclectic and melodic House with Rock, Electro-Funk, Soul, Groove and Jazz. He has played at Rex and the Queen (Paris), Le Café d'Anvers (Belgium), Lotus (New York) and Jet Set (Moscow).

His resume includes sound design for Karl Lagerfeld and French brand CELINE since 2006 along with spinning for special events for Calvin Klein, Louis Vuitton, Chopard and Armani.

Since signing with Pschent in 1996, he has mixed the six Overground House compilations, as well Club Pride and Elite Model's Attitude with Felix and Hugo Boss. Besides his DJ and compilation work, Charles Schillings is also a composer, recording and producing his own music.

His first album called, "It's About…", released in 2002, includes the single "Tengo Nada" with Clémentine Célarié. In 2004, Charles Schillings released his second album, "Not Correct", with singles "SPIN IT RIGHT" and "Not Correct".

Schillings's third album project is currently in production together with Villablack, which will be available in the course of the year.

== Discography ==
Compilations :

- Overground House vol. 1 à 6
- Trip Do Brasil
- Sérialement Vôtre
- Groove Lift – Couleur 3
- Groove from the underground – Aqua Recordings
- Club Pride
- Elite Model's Attitude (avec Felix)

Albums :

- « It's About… » – 2002
- « Not Correct » – 2004
- « Like A Radio » – 2010

Maxi :

- King Of My Castle – Wamdue Project – Strictly Rhythm
- Spin it Right – Pschent Music
- Mulele – Pschent Music
- Be gone – Pschent Music
- Tengo Nada – Pschent Music
- It’s about time – Pschent Music
