= Feeding Everyone No Matter What =

2014 book by David Denkenberger and Joshua M. Pearce

Feeding Everyone No Matter What: Managing Food Security After Global Catastrophe.
- Authors: David Denkenberger, Joshua M. Pearce
- Language: English
- Publisher: Academic Press
- Publication date: December 2014
- Publication place: United States
- ISBN: 978-0-12-802150-7

Feeding Everyone No Matter What: Managing Food Security After Global Catastrophe is a 2014 book by David Denkenberger and Joshua M. Pearce and published by Elsevier under their Academic Press.

The book analyzed five crop-destroying catastrophes (sudden climate change, super-weeds, super-bacteria, super-pests and super-pathogens) and three sunlight-extinguishing events (supervolcano eruption, asteroid or comet impact, and nuclear winter).

The book proposes more than 10 solutions for providing the global food supply, according to Discovery News.

The study that is the foundation of the book involves interdisciplinarity and gives instructions for the survivalism movement. Feeding Everyone No Matter What has been covered extensively by the international media. Io9 writes that it takes into account potential realistic scenarios, such as crop blights and nuclear winter. Seeker covered some of the foods recommended for a catastrophe. Michigan Tech News interviewed author Joshua Pearce on the solutions presented in the book.

Feeding Everyone No Matter What is also known by organizations working on the prevention of global catastrophic risks. The Future of Life Institute published an article by author Dave Denkenberger and the Centre for the Study of Existential Risk published his lecture on the book. The book was used as a resource in the Global Challenges Foundation Annual Report on Global Risks.

Feeding Everyone No Matter What proposes a fall-back plan for the worst catastrophes such as a supervolcano erupting. It outlines the cost-effectiveness of alternative foods for disaster preparedness. Science goes over the book's plan for feeding everyone in the case of the sun being blocked. Alternative foods can be developed to respond to agriculturally damaging catastrophes all over the world. The Global Catastrophic Risk Institute sees this as one piece of the assessing and preparing for global catastrophic risks.

== Claims ==
The authors, David Denkenberger and Joshua Pearce, claim alternate food sources could feed everyone even if the sun is blocked by a catastrophe such as nuclear winter, supervolcano eruption, or large asteroid/comet impact. The book focuses on what is technically possible and assumes global cooperation. The solutions also address crises including abrupt climate change, super weeds, super crop pests (animals, e.g. insects), super bacteria (e.g. disrupts beneficial bacteria) and super crop pathogens. Ruminants and other grazers can digest dietary fiber, but do not have enough offspring to feed everyone within five years.

As a backup plan, it is even possible that humans could eat predigested biomass. In a sun-obscuring crisis, stored food would last the human population less than one year. The book shows how many of these solutions can be ramped up in less than one year.

This book also addresses other issues, including energy supply, water supply, forest products, human nutrition, and preserving endangered species. Furthermore, the book gives instructions for the prepper movement.

== Criticisms ==
The authors themselves admitted a potential moral hazard with publishing the solutions, as for example Mikhail Gorbachev would explicitly state that a motivating factor for reducing the nuclear arsenal of the USSR was the concept of nuclear winter.

However, despite the popularity of the concept of "nuclear winter", there is a clear and present threat of anthropogenic abrupt climate change and the results of efforts to prevent global climate change have been ineffective. In their analysis, Denkenberger and Pearce argue that the benefits of a food solution backup plan would reduce overall harm to humanity in the global catastrophes over which control is possible and could reduce the damages associated with catastrophes over which humanity has very little or no control (e.g. supervolcanoes).

== See also ==
- Famine
- Food security
- Food systems
- Global catastrophic risk
- Survivalism
- Alliance to Feed the Earth in Disasters
