= A Night on Earth =

Studio album by Crazy Penis
- Released: 2005
- Genres: Electronic, House, Downtempo
- Label: Shiva Records
- Producer: Crazy Penis

Crazy Penis chronology
| 24 Hour Psychedelic Freakout (2003) | A Night on Earth (2005) | Stop Space Return (2008) |

A Night On Earth is a Crazy Penis album produced in 2005.

== Track listing ==
1. "Lady T"
2. "Can't Get Down"
3. "Bumcop"
4. "A Night on Earth"
5. "Turnaway"
6. "Music's My Love"
7. "Life Is My Friend"
8. "Cruising"
9. "Kicks"
10. "In Deep"
11. "Sweet Feeling"
12. "Sun-Science"
13. "Warm on the Inside"

The cover design was done by Gregory McKneally and David Vigh.

== Charts ==
Chart performance for A Night on Earth
| Chart (2005) | Peak position |
|---|---|
| Australian Albums (ARIA) | 64 |
