= Food system =

Processes by which nutritional substances are grown, raised, packaged and distributed

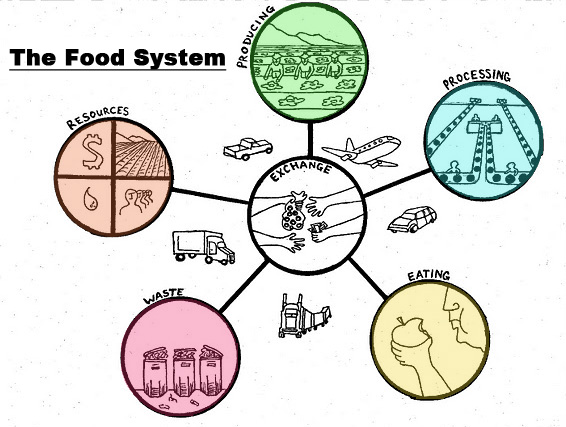
Elements of the food system

A food system is made up of all the interconnected people, institutions, policies and infrastructure involved in feeding a population. It covers every stage from food production (sowing, growing, breeding and harvesting) to processing, packaging, distributing, marketing and consuming food, and disposing of food-related waste.

The inputs needed and outputs generated at each of these steps are also part of food systems. How food systems work has a wide ranging effect on society, and influences nutrition, food, health, community development, wellbeing, rural livelihoods and agriculture.

Food systems fall within the broad category of agri-food systems, which encompass the entire range of actors and interlinked activities in the primary production of food and non-food agricultural products. Food systems are often divided into conventional and alternative, depending on how food is produced, how it reaches the plate and how sustainable it is. A food system operates within and is influenced by cultural, social, political, economic, technological and environmental contexts. It also requires specialized and trained human resources that provide labor, research and education. The global food system, including all of the various industries involved in sustainable and conventional food systems, provides employment for 1 billion people. Food systems are highly dependent on a multitude of ecosystem services, such as soil formation, nutrient cycling, microorganisms providing nitrogen-fixation, natural pest regulation, water supply and pollinators.

The global food system is a major contributor to climate change. It is responsible for more than a third (34%) of total greenhouse gas emissions, and this is expected to increase by 30–40% by 2050 due to population growth and dietary change. In turn, climate change and other pressures also affect the global food system and threaten food security. Agrifood systems need to become more resilient so that, when disruptions occur, they can continue to provide sufficient, safe and nutritious food for all and sustain the livelihoods of the people who work in them.

Transitioning to sustainable food systems is critical for addressing global challenges such as climate change, hunger, biodiversity loss, and deforestation. Around 30–40% of food produced globally is wasted. Food loss and waste occurs throughout the food system, during production, processing, distribution, retail and food service sales, and consumption. Food waste also contributes to climate change by generating 8–10% of greenhouse gas emissions. Reducing food waste also reduces the environmental impacts of agriculture, such as land use impacts, and can lower food prices or prevent shortages.

== Conventional food systems ==
Conventional food systems are characterised by operating on economies of scale. These food systems are often oriented towards increasing productivity and reducing unit costs through maximizing efficiency in order to lower consumer costs and increase overall production. They utilize economic models such as vertical integration, economic specialization and standardization, increasingly extended supply chains and global trade. These systems have contributed to substantial increases in agricultural productivity and food availability. However, they have also been associated with soil degradation, biodiversity loss and greenhouse gas emissions, as well as with the concentration of agri-food production and distribution, leading to deepening inequities in access to food.

The increasing degradation of the natural resources that food production depends on, such as soil, together with climate change and population growth, puts pressure on agricultural land and has driven efforts to raise productivity on the limited land available, including in cities.

Climate-smart agriculture has increased crop yield in some places, but limited knowledge of it, and the smallholder farming systems, hold back its wider use.

=== Impacts of conventional food systems ===
The development of conventional food systems is directly responsible for decreased food prices and increased food variety. Agronomic efficiency is driven by the necessity to constantly lower production expenses, and those savings can then be passed on to the consumer. Also, the advent of industrial agriculture and the infrastructure built around conventional food systems has enabled the world population to expand beyond the "Malthusian catastrophe" limitations. Since 1961, food supply per capita has increased by more than 30%.

However, conventional food systems are largely based on the availability of inexpensive fossil fuels, which is necessary for mechanized agriculture, the manufacture or collection of chemical fertilizers, the processing of food products, and the packaging of the foods. The increase in the availability of food since 1961 has primarily been driven by an 800% increase in the use of nitrogen fertilizers (which are fossil fuel dependent) and an over 100% increase in water usage.

These resource-intensive processes have wide ranging impacts. For example, food processing began when the number of consumers started growing rapidly. The demand for cheap and efficient calories climbed, resulting in nutrition decline. Also, industrialized agriculture, due to its reliance on economies of scale to reduce production costs, often leads to the compromising of local, regional, or even global ecosystems through fertilizer runoff, nonpoint source pollution, and greenhouse gas emissions. About a third of the world's agricultural land is at high risk of pesticide pollution, and a third of these high-risk areas are in regions of high biodiversity.

The need to reduce production costs in an increasingly global market can cause the production of foods to be moved to areas where economic costs (such as labor, taxes) are lower or environmental regulations are looser, which are usually further from consumer markets. For example, the majority of salmon sold in the United States is raised off the coast of Chile, due in large part to less stringent Chilean standards regarding fish feed even though salmon are not indigenous in Chilean coastal waters. Moving food production to regions with weaker enforcement of labor protections has made it easier to exploit agricultural workers systematically and to create jobs, typically filled by migrants, that lack security and a predictable income. The globalization of food production can result in the loss of traditional food systems in less developed countries, and have negative impacts on the population health, ecosystems, and cultures in those countries. As a result of these forces, around 645 million people are currently undernourished, and 2 billion adults are overweight and obese.

The issue of having minimal access to food, or access primarily to unhealthy food, is often described in terms of food security. Food security is often defined as a state in which "all people, at all times, have physical and economic access to sufficient, safe and nutritious food to meet their dietary needs and food preferences for an active and healthy life." Many groups argue that food security is largely determined by a given person's socioeconomic status, race, ethnicity, or other socially defined categories, making food access a social justice issue. This has given rise to numerous social movements whose goal is to increase access to healthy and culturally appropriate foods. These movements are often categorised as belonging to a wider food sovereignty and food justice movement.

=== Hidden costs ===
Hidden costs of agrifood systems

The production and consumption of food in conventional food systems have significant negative effects on the environment, society and health, the costs of which are not reflected by the price of food products. These are called hidden or external costs. For example, the conventional production and consumption of food contributes to climate change, the poverty of agricultural workers, and health issues, all of which create costs to be paid by society, and which are not offset by being included in the price. Some hidden costs are harder to measure than others. Environmental effects such as greenhouse gas emissions are relatively easy to measure because data are widely available, while impacts on human and social capital, such as working conditions and effects on local communities, are harder to quantify.

There are many different estimates regarding the total hidden costs of global agrifood systems, ranging from USD 12 trillion to USD 19 trillion per year. Out of this, the hidden health costs of global food systems amount to USD 8.1 trillion. Diets low in whole grains are the leading contributor (18 percent of global health hidden costs), alongside diets high in salt and low in fruits (16 percent each), although there is significant variation across countries.

== Alternative food systems ==
Alternative food systems (also called alternative food networks) encompass initiatives that seek to reorganize food production, distribution, and consumption in ways that differ from conventional industrial food systems. They include farmers' markets, community-supported agriculture, food cooperatives, buying groups, and other arrangements intended to reconnect producers and consumers. Characteristics distinguishing alternatives from conventional food systems include locality, short supply chains, and direct producer–consumer relations. Some alternative food networks use intermediaries between producers and consumers rather than selling directly.

=== Sustainable food systems ===
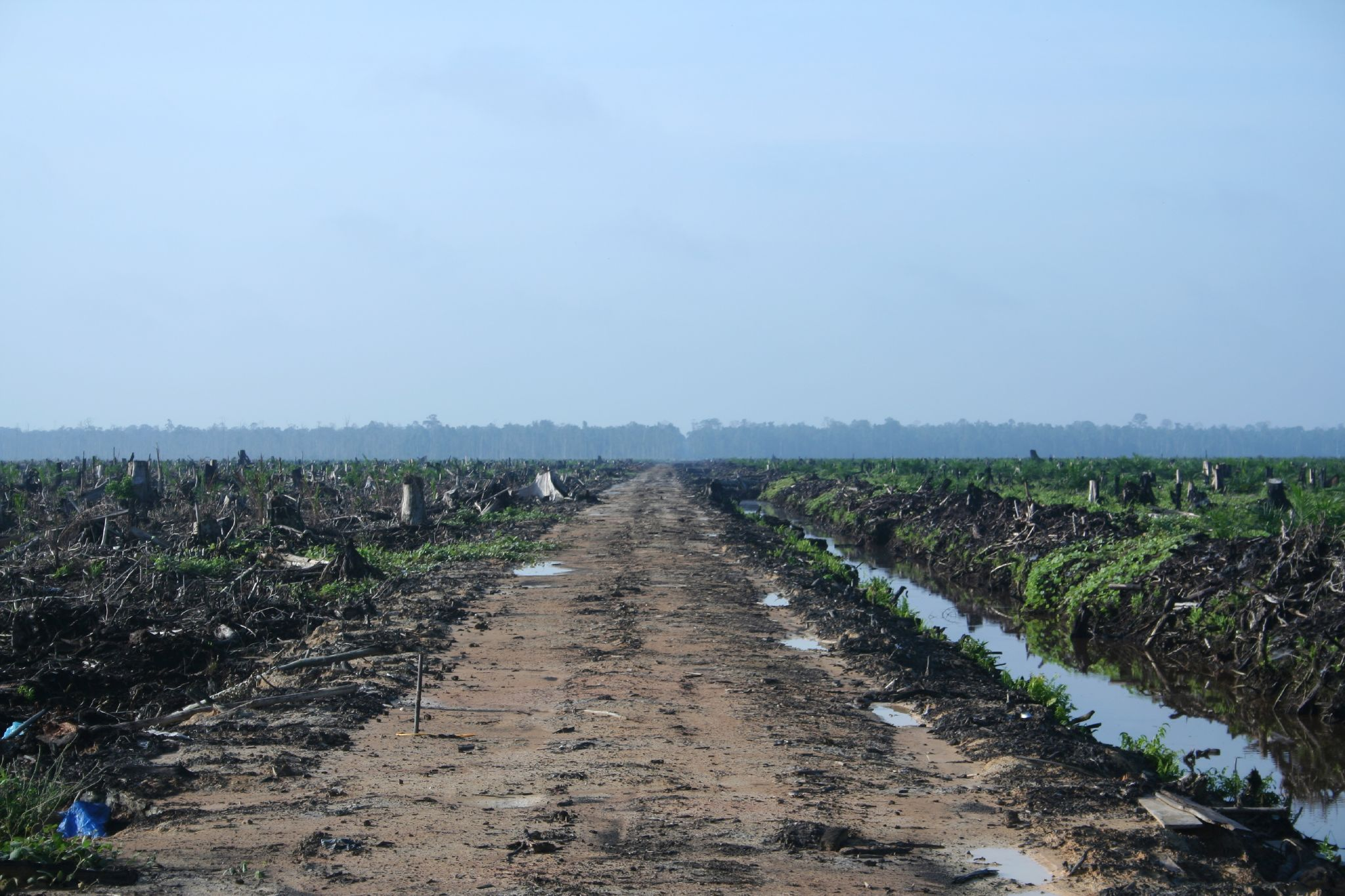
Deforestation in Indonesia is mainly driven by processes related to the production and consumption of palm oil and has a large impact on climate change

A sustainable food system is a type of food system that provides healthy food to people and creates sustainable environmental, economic, and social systems that surround food. Sustainable food systems start with the development of sustainable agricultural practices, development of more sustainable food distribution systems, creation of sustainable diets, and reduction of food waste throughout the system. Issues around the sustainability of food systems includes land use: around 69 million hectares of land are used each year to produce food that gets lost or wasted before reaching consumers and is ultimately not consumed. Sustainable food systems have been argued to be central to many or all 17 Sustainable Development Goals.

The global food system is facing major interconnected challenges, including mitigating food insecurity, effects from climate change, extreme weather events, biodiversity loss, malnutrition, inequity, soil degradation, pest outbreaks, water and energy scarcity, economic and political crises, natural resource depletion, and preventable ill-health.

=== Local food systems ===
Produce at a farmers market in the United States

Local food systems are networks of food production and consumption that aim to be geographically and economically accessible and direct. In contrast to conventional food systems, they operate with reduced food transportation and more direct marketing, leading to fewer people between the farmer and the consumer. Examples of local food systems include community-supported agriculture, farmers markets, farm to school programs, and urban agriculture. They have been associated with the 100 Mile Diet and low-carbon diet, as well as the slow food movement.

The decreased distance of food transportation has been promoted for its environmental benefits. Also, where food is transported more locally and where the network is denser – such as in high-income countries and densely populated countries like China, India, and Nigeria –, adverse events have a much lower impact on increases in travel time and food costs than where food is transported further distances.

Food sovereignty activists argue that local communities should not only have access to nutritious and culturally appropriate foods, but that those communities should also be able to define the means by which their food is produced. Local production of food is essential to achieving food security, especially among indigenous communities, and thus are crucial to the public health of those communities.

Due to the close proximity between producers and consumers, relationships that are developed in local food systems emerge from face-to-face interactions, potentially leading to a stronger sense of trust and social connectedness between actors. As a result, local food systems can be a good way to revitalize a community.

Both proponents and critics of local food systems warn that they can lead to narrow inward-looking attitudes or 'local food patriotism', and that price premiums and local food cultures can be elitist and exclusive.

=== Organic food systems ===
An organic certification

Organic food systems are characterized by growing crops without chemical pesticides and fertilizers, preferring naturally occurring, non-synthetic inputs, such as compost manure, green manure, and bone meal. They also place emphasis on techniques such as crop rotation, companion planting, and mixed cropping. Livestock is reared without the use of antibiotics or growth hormones.

The transparency of food information is vital for organic food systems as a means through which consumers are able to identify organic food. As a result, a variety of certification bodies have emerged that independently verify that the product has been produced using organic means.

=== Cooperatives in food systems ===
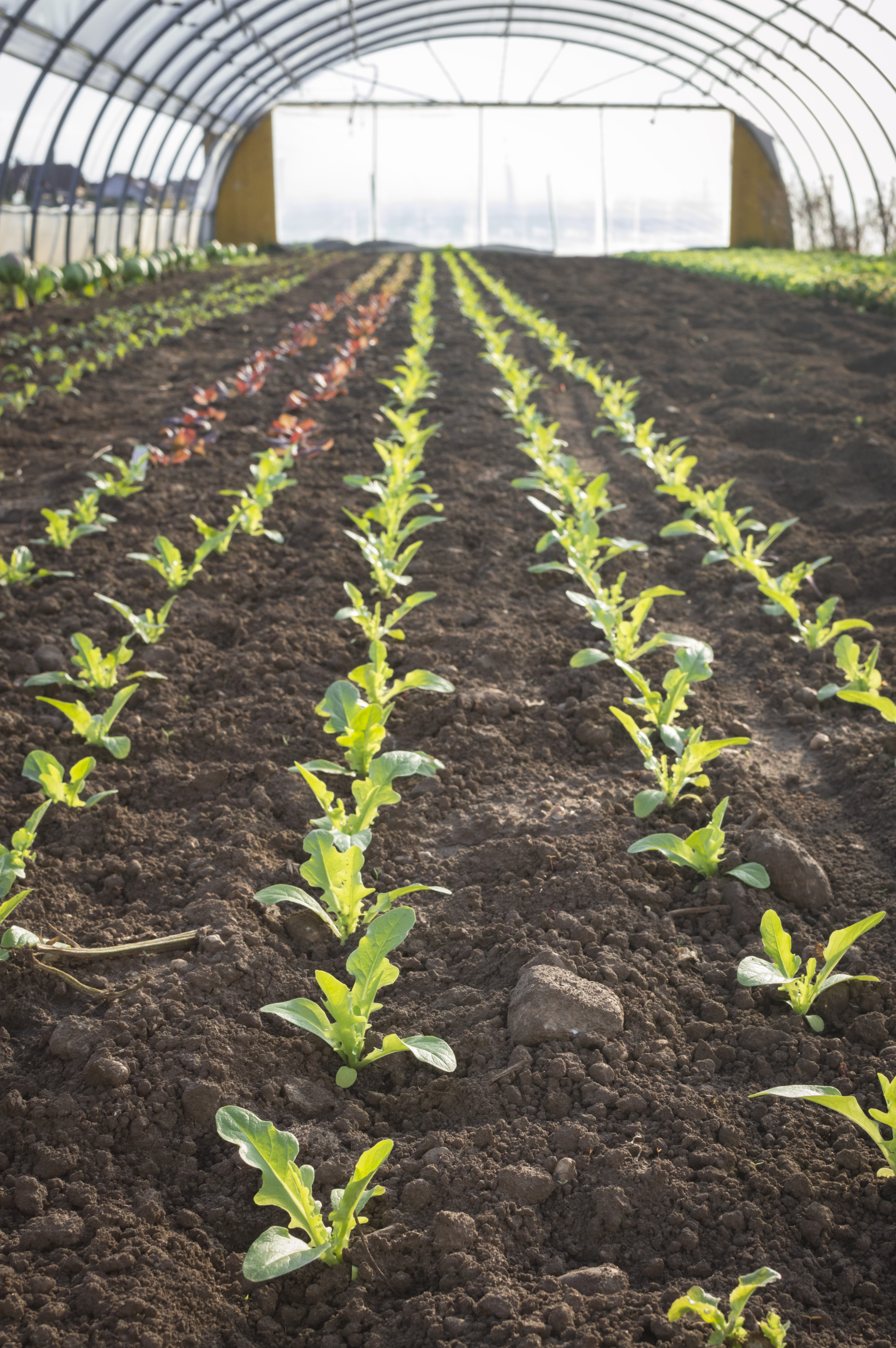
A greenhouse with salad of a cooperative

Joint ownership and control through cooperatives (co-ops) can exist both at the farmer end of food production and the consumer end. Farming cooperatives refer to arrangements where farmers pool resources, either to cultivate their crops or get their crops to market. Consumer cooperatives often refer to food cooperatives where its members own a grocery store through buying shares. Cooperative grocery stores, unlike corporate grocery stores, are socially owned, which means that surpluses are not taken from the store as profit. As food co-ops do not work for profit, they are potentially able to keep their prices lower. Other forms of cooperatives that have developed more recently include community-supported agriculture, where community members buy a share in a farm's harvest, and may also be engaged in farm labor, operating at both the consumer and producer end of food systems. Garden sharing pairs individual landowners and food growers, while variations on this approach organize groups of food gardeners for mutual assistance.

Producer associations and cooperatives reinforce small-scale agricultural producers' livelihoods by allowing the pooling of resources to achieve scale, facilitating access to productive resources, and enhancing marketing power. Coordination with other actors is also key to managing market risks. Mutual benefits can be achieved, for example, through forwarding contracts: farmers receive guaranteed prices for their outputs regardless of market conditions, while processors and distributors receive products of a desired quality. For farming cooperatives that share resources, the burden of investment is disbursed to all members rather than being concentrated in a single individual.

=== Commoning ===
In terms of land, the commons refers to parcels and resources that are used collectively. The collective management and stewardship of shared resources, known as commoning, is central to many food systems globally. Contemporary commoning practices in food systems aim to both reclaim lands that were taken away in the past through colonial, imperial, and capitalist processes and also challenge industrial agriculture's logic of enforcing strict land boundaries and erecting fenced-off parcels. These can include traditional systems such as shared agricultural commons and collectively managed forests as well as newer institutional structures such as community land trusts and seed banking. By restoring collective decision-making and tenure security around food production, commoning supports food sovereignty and environmental stewardship and helps addressing the racial and colonial legacies in modern property law and agricultural governance. In this sense, commoning is inseparable from broader movements for land justice, decolonization, and food system transformation.

=== Fair trade ===
Fair trade is a trade arrangement designed to help producers in developing countries achieve sustainable and equitable conditions when exporting to developed countries. It is mainly defined by more direct trading and communication systems whereby producers have greater control over the conditions of trade and garner a greater fraction of the sale price. The fair trade movement advocates paying higher prices to exporters and improving social and environmental standards.

=== Novel agricultural technologies ===
Vertical farms, automation, solar energy production, novel alternatives to pesticides, online food delivery ICTs, and other technologies may allow for localization or modified food production alongside policies such as eco-tariffs, targeted subsidies and meat taxes.

Artificial intelligence and data-driven approaches are increasingly applied in food systems to analyze complex data and support decision-making in food production, processing, distribution, safety, nutrition, and sustainability.

=== Resilient foods ===
An expected 345.2 million people were projected to be food insecure in 2023 – more than double the number in 2020. Several studies have argued resilient food could provide the calories to support the global population even without agriculture. The book Feeding Everyone No Matter What and peer-reviewed studies propose several approaches, including: global-scale conversion including natural gas-digesting bacteria (single cell protein), extracting food from leaves, and conversion of fiber by enzymes, mushroom or bacteria growth, or a two-step process involving partial decomposition of fiber by fungi and/or bacteria and feeding them to animals such as beetles, ruminants (cattle, sheep, etc.), rats and chickens. Most alternative food work covers carbohydrates and protein, but there are also ways to make synthetic fat. Because fats are generally achiral, they may be synthesized without biological processes at high temperatures and pressures, the greater efficiency of which may make them more cost-effective than other synthetic macronutrients. By mixing many alternative foods micro-nutrient balance is possible. Such alternatives may also help to decouple food production and land use, thereby avoiding the greenhouse gas emissions and habitat loss associated with agriculture.

== Climate change ==
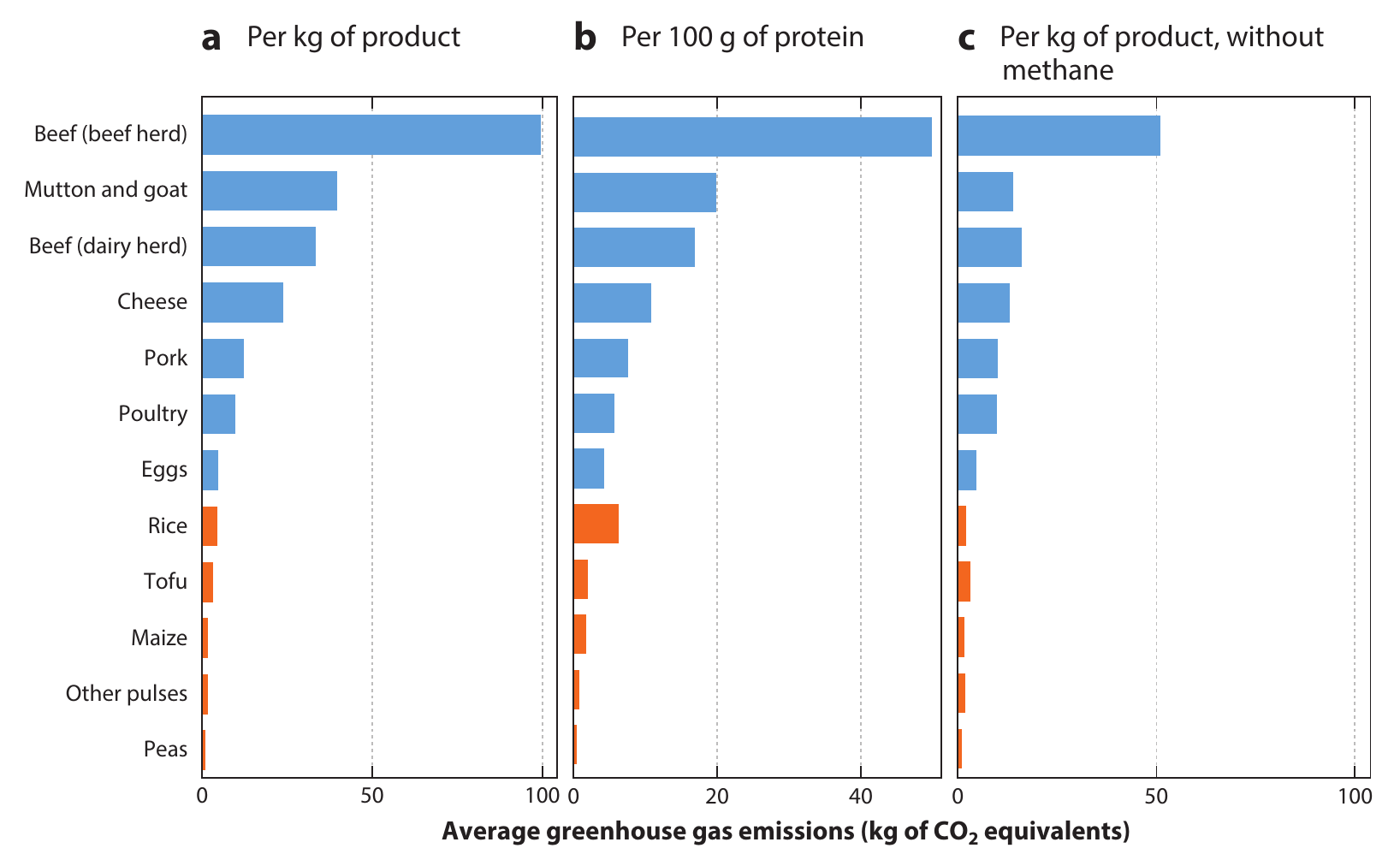
Average greenhouse gas emissions associated with different food products

The food system is one of the largest sources of greenhouse gas emissions, responsible for more than a third (34%) of global emissions. This includes carbon dioxide (CO_{2}) emissions from crop and livestock production, transportation, changing land use (including deforestation), and food loss and waste. Without significant change, emissions will increase by 30–40% by 2050 due to population growth and changing consumption patterns, and environmental cost of food production is estimated to grow to $16 trillion per year. Reducing emissions from the global food system is considered essential for achieving the Paris Agreement's climate goals. Moving to sustainable food systems, including via shifting consumption to sustainable diets, is an important component of addressing the causes of climate change and adapting to it. Reports by the IPCC and the EU concluded the food system can be adapted to cut emissions and address food security while shifting towards sustainable diets. Reduction of meat production, which accounts for ~60% of the food system's emissions and ~75% of agriculturally used land, is one major component of this change.

The global food system itself could face major food security risks from the results of climate change, including changing local weather, the socioeconomic effects of climate change, the vulnerability of some types of farming and food, and changes in diet due to availability.

== Public policy ==
International policy has increasingly approached policy from a food systems perspective: Sustainable Development Goal 2: Zero Hunger and Sustainable Development Goal 12: "responsible consumption and production" focus on sustainable food systems and in September 2021 the United Nations hosted the first Food Systems Summit.

=== European Union ===
Multiple policies guide and govern the different aspects and sectors of the EU's food system, some of which address managing the impacts of climate change on food production and food security. For example, the EU Soil Strategy for 2030 lays out the plan to achieve healthy soils for food provision and climate mitigation, while the Common Agricultural Policy provides risk management instruments and an annual crisis reserve to support farmers. However, many parts of the food system, such as processing and retail, lack EU policies that would address the risks of climate change.

The EU's Scientific Advice Mechanism and its Chief Scientific Advisors stated that adapting the European food system for the future should be a high priority for the EU, and delivered multiple scientific opinions on how to transition. In 2020, the EU published its strategy for transitioning to a sustainable food system, called Farm-to-Fork, but in 2025 this was replaced by the Vision for Agriculture and Food, which shifted the emphasis to competitiveness and simplifying regulations.

=== Corporate influence ===
Private sector corporations have been successful in building partnerships with governments which allows them to influence how food systems work and are governed. Public–private partnerships and private sector led multistakeholder governance have positioned corporations as a leading voice on decisions where public governance authorities have become dependent on private sector funding. Lobbying influences trade agreements for food systems which led to creating barriers to competition and technical barriers to trade. Concerns around corporate governance within food systems as a substitute for regulation were raised by the Institute for Multi-Stakeholder Initiative Integrity.

== Transparency ==
Transparency within food systems refers to the full disclosure of information about rules, procedures, and practices at all levels within a food production and supply chain. Transparency ensures that consumers have detailed information about the production of a given food item. Traceability, by contrast, is the ability to trace all components to their origins in a food production and marketing chain, whether processed or unprocessed foods. Concerns about transparency and traceability have been heightened by food safety scares such as bovine spongiform encephalopathy (BSE) and E. coli outbreaks, but do not exclusively refer to food safety. Transparency also matters for qualities that relate to how a food was produced rather than to the food itself, such as animal welfare, social justice issues and environmental impact.

One of the primary ways transparency is achieved is through certification and the use of food labels. Participation in local food systems such as community-supported agriculture, farmers markets, food cooperatives, and farmer cooperatives also enhances transparency. Nutrition and sustainability labeling can also play a role in changing consumer behaviour.

== History ==
The development of increasingly complex food systems can be traced back to the emergence of more permanent forms of settlement, the domestication of plants and animals, and the production of food surpluses. These surpluses enabled the development of settled areas and contributed to the development of ancient civilizations, particularly those in the Fertile Crescent. The system of trade associated with the exchange of foodstuffs also emerged in East Asia, North America, South America, and Sub-Saharan Africa with common commodities of exchange such as salt, spices, fish, grains. Events such as the conquests of Alexander the Great, the Crusades, the expansion of Islam, the journeys of Marco Polo, and the European exploration and colonization of the Americas spread new foods around the world, and food systems began to mix on a global scale. After World War II, industrialized agriculture and stronger global trade mechanisms developed into the model of food production, presentation, delivery and disposal that characterizes conventional food systems today.

== See also ==
- Agricultural value chain
- Agroecology
- Aquaculture
- Animal welfare
- Environmental impact of agriculture
- Factory farming
- Food safety
- Food security
- Food chain
- Food industry
- Industrial agriculture
- Organic farming
- Sustainable agriculture
- Sustainable diet

== Sources ==
This article incorporates text from a free content work. Licensed under CC BY-SA 3.0 (license statement/permission). Text taken from The State of Food and Agriculture 2019. Moving forward on food loss and waste reduction, In brief, 24, FAO, FAO.

This article incorporates text from a free content work. Licensed under CC BY-SA 3.0 (license statement/permission). Text taken from The State of Food and Agriculture 2021. Making agrifood systems more resilient to shocks and stresses, In brief, FAO, FAO.

This article incorporates text from a free content work. Licensed under CC BY-SA 3.0 (license statement/permission). Text taken from Robust transport networks support agrifood systems' resilience, FAO, FAO.

This article incorporates text from a free content work. Licensed under CC BY 4.0 (license statement/permission). Text taken from In Brief to The State of Food and Agriculture 2024, FAO, FAO.
