= List of ThunderCats (1985 TV series) episodes =

ThunderCats is an animated cartoon series created by Rankin/Bass Productions.

Season 1 comprises 65 episodes, a standard number for animated series at the time, as it allowed the series to be shown every weekday for thirteen weeks (one full broadcast season). The series' two-part pilot episode debuted starting January 23, 1985, with airdates varying by market; WTOG aired it on January 23, while WNEW aired it on February 1. The series subsequently began airing in its regular weekday time slot on September 9. In 1986, the series returned for a TV movie, ThunderCats - Ho!, which was subsequently aired as five separate episodes worked into the continuing rerun rotation of season 1.

The entire series has been released on DVD, collecting both seasons across two box-sets. Season 1, Volume 1 was recalled when it was discovered that the second episode was missing its background musical score, and a corrected version was released in its place. Volume 1 was released on August 9, 2005, and Volume 2 on December 6, 2005.

== Episodes ==
=== Series overview ===
Season	Episodes	Originally released	
Season	Episodes	First released	Last released
1	65	January 23, 1985	December 20, 1985
"ThunderCats - Ho!"	5	October 1, 1986	October 1, 1986
2	20	September 17, 1987	October 9, 1987
3	20	September 5, 1988	September 30, 1988
4	20	September 4, 1989	September 29, 1989

=== Season 1 (1985) ===
This list presents the episodes in their original broadcast order, which is also the order used for the DVD release of the series. However, in the case of the first season, this is not a chronological story order, and results in several events occurring out of order; most notably, the five-part mini-series, "Lion-O's Anointment", is spread throughout the season instead of being presented consecutively. When the series was re-aired on Cartoon Network years later, it was presented in an alternate, more chronologically-correct order; this was based on the show's production order, but with multi-part episodes arranged consecutively.

No. overall	No. in season	Title	Written by	Original release date	Prod. code	Cartoon Network order
1	1	"Exodus (Pilot: Part One)"	Leonard Starr	January 23, 1985	1	1
The ThunderCats must find a new home after their home planet, Thundera, explodes. Their journey changes when an enemy force, the Mutants, attack and leaves their ship severely crippled. With the others forced into sleep capsules, Jaga must pilot the ship for the world known as Third Earth. Lion-O – who is adult-like in appearance, but retains the mentality of a young boy – must learn what it means to become a man and the Lord of the ThunderCats as he learns to wield the power of the Sword of Omens.
2	2	"The Unholy Alliance (Pilot: Part Two)"	Leonard Starr	January 23, 1985	2	2
While exploring Third Earth, the Mutants' ship, piloted by Slithe, Monkian and Jackalman, is brought down by a mysterious black pyramid; it is the home of Mumm-Ra, an evil demon sorcerer, who is willing to form an alliance to capture the Eye of Thundera. Lion-O, the young Lord of the ThunderCats, is about to face his toughest enemy yet.
3	3	"Berbils"	Leonard Starr	September 11, 1985	3	3
Panthro introduces the ThunderTank, saving the others from a meteor shower – conjured by Mumm-Ra – that buries the remnants of the ThunderCats' ship. Later, Lion-O and Snarf are taken prisoner by a band of small robotic bears named Ro-Bear Berbils, led by Ro-Bear Bill and Ro-Bear Belle. They soon learn that the Berbils are being frequently attacked by the Trolligs, who steal their fruit to give to the Giantorrs.
4	4	"The Slaves of Castle Plun-darr"	Leonard Starr	September 12, 1985	4	4
The Cats' Lair is nearly complete when an agitated Wilykit and Wilykat rush home to tell the other ThunderCats that the Mutants have enslaved a race of creatures called Brute-Men to build their new fortress, Castle Plun-darr. After learning more about the Brute-Men from the Berbils, Tygra tells the twins to stay behind, as the adult ThunderCats rush off to free these peaceful creatures.
5	5	"Pumm-Ra"	Jules Bass	September 13, 1985	6	6
Mumm-Ra disguises himself as a Thunderian named Pumm-Ra, and claims to have rescued Cheetara from the mutants in order to infiltrate the now completed Cats' Lair.
6	6	"The Terror of Hammerhand"	Ron Goulart and Jules Bass	September 16, 1985	7	7
Snarf is captured after freeing a unicorn from the pirate Hammerhand and his Berserkers, who are out hunting for food. Lion-O meets the Unicorn Keepers and then sets out to free Snarf from his captors.
7	7	"Trouble with Time"	Ron Goulart and Jules Bass	September 17, 1985	5	5
The Mutants are looking for a "feminine touch" around Castle Plun-darr, and attempt to capture natives of the Third Earth. Willa, of the Warrior Maidens, is introduced, and she and her sister, Nayda, manage to fight off Monkian; both of the Warrior Maidens are cautious of the new arrivals (i.e., the ThunderCats and the Mutants). Lion-O also takes the ThunderTank for a short-lived joyride, whilst Tygra looks for Thundrylium in a strange cave and begins to age at an accelerated rate.
8	8	"The Tower of Traps"	Leonard Starr	September 18, 1985	8	8
Wilykit and Wilykat meet a traveling Wolo and then go in search of a piece of stolen jewellery. Wilykat becomes a prisoner locked up in a tower. Lion-O and Wilykit must find their way to him through a maze of booby traps, set by a mysterious being known as Baron Karnor.
9	9	"The Garden of Delights"	Barney Cohen and Jules Bass	September 19, 1985	9	9
Tygra chases a giant worm underground and encounters the Molemen. After following them, he runs into Mumm-Ra, who has disguised himself as a flower named Silky. Tygra is drugged and used against his fellow ThunderCats to steal the Sword of Omens. Mumm-Ra and the Mutants capture Willa, in an effort to use the Sword and destroy the ThunderCats.
10	10	"Mandora - The Evil Chaser"	William Overgard	September 20, 1985	10	10
Lion-O finds what looks like a spaceship's escape pod; he opens it and inadvertently releases the galactic convicts Quickpick, Burnout, and Plutar. Mandora the Evil Chaser is introduced and Lion-O assists her in trying to recapture the convicts, encountering the Living Ooze and the subterranean Mudhogs along the way.
11	11	"The Ghost Warrior"	Leonard Starr	September 23, 1985	11	11
While searching for treasure inside an ancient tomb, two Bolkins, Bundun and Hurrick, accidentally release the ghost of the evil Grune the Destroyer. Grune knows of the ThunderCats and reveals an ancient and storied past with Jaga. The Bolkins, Wolos, and Berbils urge the ThunderCats to help them against this powerful foe.
12	12	"The Doomgaze"	Stephen Perry	September 24, 1985	12	12
Mumm-Ra forms an alliance with an ancient priestess named Ta-She, who has the power to mesmerize males with her gaze.
13	13	"Lord of the Snows"	Bob Haney	September 25, 1985	13	13
A meteor of pure Thundrylium crashes into the remote Hook Mountain. When Lion-O goes after it, he finds himself face to face with a man of the mountain whom he must fight. This is also the first appearance of Vultureman.
14	14	"The Spaceship Beneath the Sands"	Leonard Starr	September 26, 1985	14	14
After repeated defeats, the Mutants ask Mumm-Ra to return their ship, which he buried in the desert around his pyramid. Once it is resurfaced, they have new weapons to use against the ThunderCats.
15	15	"The Time Capsule"	Peter Lawrence	September 27, 1985	15	15
The ThunderCats decide it is time to search for their time capsule from Thundera, which has been missing since they crash-landed on Third Earth.
16	16	"The Fireballs of Plun-Darr"	William Overgard	September 30, 1985	16	16
The Tree Top Kingdom is attacked by fire balls launched from a new weapon inside Castle Plun-darr. When Tygra goes to investigate, he is captured and locked into a device which will rip him apart by pulling out his four limbs. Lion-O and Willa must rescue Tygra and destroy the Mutants' new weapon.
17	17	"All That Glitters"	Bob Haney	October 1, 1985	17	17
Mumm-Ra tricks Lion-O and Tygra into fighting each other, which causes the Sword of Omens to break. In order to repair it, the ThunderCats seek the help of a being whose powers are derived from bathing in liquid gold.
18	18	"Spitting Image"	Howard Post	October 2, 1985	18	18
After Driller captures Panthro, Mumm-Ra creates an evil clone of the real Panthro to turn the people of Third Earth against the ThunderCats.
19	19	"Mongor"	Peter Lawrence	October 3, 1985	20	24
While exploring, the ThunderKittens stumble across an old temple where their curiosity gets the best of them and they release a demon – a goat-like creature who gets more powerful as others fear him named Mongor. It's up to the ThunderCats to find a way to overcome their fears and defeat this monster.
20	20	"Return to Thundera"	Bob Haney	October 4, 1985	21	25
The Mutants unleash a new invincible war robot while Lion-O accidentally travels back in time to Thundera after he enters the Time Capsule's hologram. There, he meets his father, Claudius, who gives him a scroll containing the secret of the War Robot.
21	21	"Dr. Dometone"	William Overgard	October 7, 1985	30	33
A frog robot swallows Wilykit. It turns out to be piloted by Dr. Dometome – the scientist responsible for maintaining the ocean's plug, which stops the ocean draining into the Earth's core.
22	22	"The Astral Prison"	Peter Lawrence	October 8, 1985	31	34
When Jaga is imprisoned in the Astral World, Lion-O must journey there to free him. However, there is no way for him to return.
23	23	"The Crystal Queen"	Leonard Starr	October 9, 1985	24	28
A rare and beautiful bird is captured by the queen of a crystal kingdom by the crystal queen Tartara who flies in on her sleigh to take the Berbils' Ariettabird. But this bird brings them a fruitful harvest and the ThunderCats are called to help return it to the Berbils.
24	24	"Safari Joe"	Stephen Perry	October 10, 1985	26	29
Safari Joe comes to Third Earth with his robot mule looking for prey worthy of being hunted, and he begins hunting the weakness of the ThunderCats.
25	25	"Snarf Takes up the Challenge"	Peter Lawrence	October 11, 1985	22	26
After the ThunderCats are captured by Mumm-Ra, it is up to Snarf to save them.
26	26	"Sixth Sense"	Peter Lawrence	October 28, 1985	29	32
A ship in trouble tries to ask the ThunderCats for help using Cheetara's sixth sense. It ends up taking control of Cheetara, putting her life in danger as the mutants attack it.
27	27	"The Thunder-Cutter"	William Overgard	October 29, 1985	36	38
Lion-O meets Hachiman, a samurai who wields a sword called the Thunder-Cutter.
28	28	"The Wolfrat"	Chris Trengove	October 30, 1985	40	46
Vultureman builds a robot called the Wolfrat, which uses a miniaturization gas to reduce the ThunderCats to nine inches tall. They must rely on a normal-sized Snarf to help them defeat the robot.
29	29	"Feliner - Part One"	Stephen Perry	October 31, 1985	39	41
Vultureman summons the Mutant warlord, Ratar-O, who kidnaps Snarf's nephew, Snarfer, on the planet of Snarfs. They bring Snarfer back to Third Earth and use him as bait to trap the ThunderCats.
30	30	"Feliner - Part Two"	Stephen Perry	November 1, 1985	45	42
The ThunderCats race to try to salvage the part they need for the Feliner from the wreck of the Rat Star before the Mutants can complete repairs. Snarf contemplates leaving the Thundercats forever.
31	31	"Mandora and the Pirates"	William Overgard	November 4, 1985	23	27
After Mandora boards a space freighter – which turns out to be the ancient space-pirate ship The Jolly Rogers – for inspection, she needs Lion-O's help. She is captured by a renegade robot called Captain Cracker. But Lion-O drops his Sword of Omens....
32	32	"Return of the Driller"	Howard Post	November 5, 1985	27	30
Mumm-Ra instructs the Driller to bore a tunnel from the Acid Lake to the Cats' Lair; it's a race to save the Lair as they face many obstacles while trying to obtain and bring back a sponge cloud to fill the hole.
33	33	"Dimension Doom"	Bob Haney	November 6, 1985	33	36
Wizz-Ra returns from the seventh dimension once every seven thousand years; this time, he enters Cats' Lair through a mirror in Cheetara's room. Mumm-Ra, his ancient enemy, is able to steal his magic helmet. He then enslaves the ThunderCats, and only Cheetara and Snarf are left to help their new friend before his time runs out.
34	34	"Queen of 8 Legs"	Stephen Perry	November 7, 1985	32	35
Disguised as a diamond fly, Mumm-Ra entices Lion-O into Spidera's Kingdom of Webs.
35	35	"Sword in a Hole"	William Overgard	November 8, 1985	44	45
The ThunderCats respond to a space liner's SOS, only to be captured by mercenaries paid by Mumm-Ra. The Sword of Omens is cast into a black hole.
36	36	"The Evil Harp of Charr-Nin"	Douglas Bernstein and Denis Markell	November 11, 1985	51	51
Wilykit and Wilykat find a magic harp containing a genie. Mumm-Ra offers to free the genie if he helps to destroy the ThunderCats.
37	37	"Lion-O's Anointment First Day: The Trial of Strength"	Leonard Starr	November 12, 1985	19	19
Snarf tells Lion-O that he must earn his title as Lord of the ThunderCats by completing five trials, the first of which will be to defeat the mighty Panthro.
38	38	"The Demolisher"	Bob Haney and Peter Lawrence	November 13, 1985	38	40
A bored galactic conqueror comes to Third Earth to battle Mumm-Ra. After defeating Mumm-Ra, and hearing of the ThunderCats power, he rushes off to battle Lion-O.
39	39	"Monkian's Bargain"	Lee Schneider	November 14, 1985	53	53
Monkian makes a deal with Mumm-Ra to give him power orbs – whatever the cost.
40	40	"Tight Squeeze"	Stephen Perry	November 15, 1985	52	52
After a disagreement, Vultureman leaves Castle Plun-darr and destroys all the Mutants' technology. Slithe is forced to ask Mumm-Ra to take away the ThunderCats' weapons, which he seals within the sword chamber so that the ThunderCats cannot reach them.
41	41	"The Micrits"	Bruce Smith	November 18, 1985	48	49
Lion-O is captured by very small creatures who see him as a threat to their village, and disable Cats' Lair and the ThunderTank. The Mutants seize the opportunity and wreak havoc on the other ThunderCats, who do not know where Lion-O is.
42	42	"Lion-O's Anointment Second Day: The Trial of Speed"	Leonard Starr	November 19, 1985	25	20
Lion-O must beat Cheetara in a race to pass the second anointment trial.
43	43	"The Rock Giant"	Peter Lawrence	November 20, 1985	35	37
Mumm-Ra awakens a monster made of rocks to defeat the ThunderCats.
44	44	"Jackalman's Rebellion"	Bruce Smith	November 21, 1985	55	55
Jackalman forms his own army and steals weapons from the Mutants.
45	45	"Turmagar the Tuska"	C.H. Trengove	November 22, 1985	28	31
A strange traveller crash-lands next to Cats' Lair and enlists the ThunderCats' help to battle a war machine.
46	46	"Lion-O's Anointment Third Day: The Trial of Cunning"	Leonard Starr	November 25, 1985	34	21
Lion-O must outwit Wilykit and Wilykat in the Maze of Infinity. However, there are more than ThunderKittens lurking about and ready to stop him.
47	47	"The Mumm-Ra Berbil"	Jeri Craden	November 26, 1985	58	58
Mumm-Ra disguises himself as an injured Berbil to infiltrate Cats' Lair.
48	48	"Mechanical Plague"	Peter Lawrence	November 27, 1985	37	39
Mumm-Ra takes advantage of the ThunderCats being separated as they make their own home movies. He gives life to a mechanical plague of robots to aid in his plot to destroy the ThunderCats.
49	49	"Trapped"	Stephen Perry	November 28, 1985	61	61
Sheltering from a storm inside an old Suspension Capsule, Wilykit and Wilykat become trapped. Things take a turn for the worse when the Mutants find out about it.
50	50	"Lion-O's Anointment Fourth Day: The Trial of Mind Power"	Leonard Starr	November 29, 1985	42	22
Lion-O must overcome Tygra's mental powers and face his greatest fear.
51	51	"Excalibur"	Peter Lawrence	December 2, 1985	41	43
Disguised as King Arthur, Mumm-Ra schemes to gain possession of Excalibur, the most powerful sword ever created.
52	52	"Secret of the Ice King"	Bob Haney	December 3, 1985	43	44
Frozen for a thousand years, an Ice King is suddenly awakened, and wreaks havoc on Hook Mountain.
53	53	"Good and Ugly"	Peter Lawrence	December 4, 1985	46	47
Two aliens arrive in spaceships and fight near Cats' Lair. Lion-O must learn a lesson about first impressions.
54	54	"The Transfer"	Lawrence DuKore and Lee Schneider	December 5, 1985	62	62
An unknown ship containing a dangerous radioactive device approaches Third Earth.
55	55	"Divide and Conquer"	Lee Schneider	December 6, 1985	47	48
Vultureman creates a voice imitator. The Mutants use it to trick the ThunderCats into splitting up to trap and destroy them.
56	56	"Dream Master"	Heather Winters and Annabelle Gurwitch	December 9, 1985	64	64
Mumm-Ra assumes the form of the Dream Master to take control of the ThunderCats' unconscious selves.
57	57	"Out of Sight"	C.H. Trengove	December 10, 1985	54	54
Willa is captured by the Mutants. Tygra makes himself and Nayda invisible to infiltrate castle Plun-darr, not knowing the consequences.
58	58	"The Mountain"	Danny Peary	December 11, 1985	56	56
Out of sheer boredom, Lion-O climbs an unknown mountain. The Mutants decide to attack, putting themselves and the ThunderCats in danger.
59	59	"The Superpower Potion"	C.H. Trengove	December 12, 1985	50	50
In his quest to defeat the ThunderCats and rule Third Earth, Vultureman decides to make a potion that gives him superpowers.
60	60	"Eye of the Beholder"	Kenneth E. Vose	December 13, 1985	57	57
The ThunderCats create a fake Sword of Omens and use it to trick the Mutants; the plan backfires when Snarf is captured.
61	61	"Lion-O's Anointment Final Day: The Trial of Evil"	Leonard Starr	December 16, 1985	49	23
Lion-O must defeat his greatest enemy, Mumm-Ra, to complete the trials.
62	62	"The Trouble with ThunderKittens"	Kimberly B. Morris	December 17, 1985	59	59
Eager to prove that they are old enough for adult weapons, Wilykit and Wilykat sneak off with the other Thundercats' weapons for some practice. The Mutants seize an opportunity and the kids escape, but the weapons are now in the hands of the Mutants. The kids will have to confess to Lion-O what they did in order to gain his help in retrieving them.
63	63	"Mumm-Rana"	Bob Haney	December 18, 1985	60	60
After a space battle, the Mutants' escape pods land next to a white pyramid. Inside, they meet Mumm-Rana, the good equivalent of Mumm-Ra. Mumm-Ra arrives and takes control of her mind, hoping to use her power against the ThunderCats.
64	64	"The Shifter"	Matthew Malach	December 19, 1985	63	63
Vultureman builds a device that switches the consciousness of two beings and takes aim at the ThunderCats.
65	65	"Fond Memories"	Lee Schneider	December 20, 1985	65	65
Disguised as Dr. Dometone, Mumm-Ra decides to lure Lion-O into a living museum of the ThunderCats' most formidable enemies.

=== ThunderCats – Ho! (1986) ===
This five-episode miniseries, featuring the new and returning characters added to the ThunderCats toyline in 1986 and 1987, was first broadcast as a TV movie, then later worked into the rotation of season 1 re-runs.

- This movie also as in a regular episode airing used the episode Title ThunderCats Ho! and omitting the Part 1 - 5 which was later seen when aired in 5 parts. The Part sub title in the episode was re enstated during the 5 part half hour split.

No. overall	No. in season	Title	Written by	Original release date	Prod. code	Cartoon Network order
66	1	"ThunderCats - Ho! Part One"	Leonard Starr	October 1, 1986	66	66
Lion-O is awakened by recurring nightmares of Thunderians being killed on Thundera as he fled to safety with Jaga and the other ThunderCats. Jaga comes to tell him that they in fact survived and are living on Third Earth. After meeting with the other ThunderCats, they decide to begin searching for them, but Mumm-Ra has plans as well.
67	2	"ThunderCats - Ho! Part Two"	Leonard Starr	October 1, 1986	67	67
Lion-O's rescue attempt fails and the captured Thunderians are taken to Fire Rock Mountain after another failed attempt on their part to break free from their captors.
68	3	"ThunderCats - Ho! Part Three"	Leonard Starr	October 1, 1986	68	68
Lion-O loses the Sword of Omens in an avalanche. Panthro battles the Fist-Pounder with the ThunderTank. The Mutants arrive at Fire Rock Mountain to take control of the prisoners.
69	4	"ThunderCats - Ho! Part Four"	Leonard Starr	October 1, 1986	69	69
The Thunderians attempt to escape their prison. Lion-O arrives at Fire Rock Mountain and is confronted by Hachiman, who believes Lion-O is causing the suffering of his ancestor.
70	5	"ThunderCats - Ho! Part Five"	Leonard Starr	October 1, 1986	70	70
Lion-O and Hachiman reconcile and the ThunderCats close in on rescuing the Thunderians from Fire Rock Mountain. They will need supernatural help if they are to pass through the Thundranium gasses to reach them.

=== Season 2 (1987) ===
Mumm-Ra Lives! was originally broadcast as a TV movie.

No. overall	No. in season	Title	Written by	Original release date	Prod. code	Cartoon Network order
71	1	"Mumm-Ra Lives! Part I"	Leonard Starr	September 17, 1987	71	71
Mumm-Ra is weak and faces the threat of three new ThunderCats; he sends the Mutants to release his old enemies, the Lunatacs, imprisoned in Dark Side in order to bolster the forces of evil. The ThunderCats' celebration of their victory over Mumm-Ra and the welcoming of three new ThunderCats is cut short when Snarf overhears plans at Castle Plun-darr after he chased Ma-Mutt there from the Berbil village.
72	2	"Mumm-Ra Lives! Part II"	Leonard Starr	September 17, 1987	72	72
The Mutants succeed in releasing the Lunatacs. The ThunderCats discover their Thundrylium mine is being looted and people are being kidnapped from the villages. Lion-O and the ThunderKittens have their first run-in with a Lunatac and Bengali's skills as a blacksmith come in handy.
73	3	"Mumm-Ra Lives! Part III"	Leonard Starr	September 17, 1987	73	73
The ThunderCats build the Tower of Omens to monitor for Sky Tomb, which will be run by the new ThunderCats. Disguised as a Berbil, Ma-Mutt spies on the ThunderCats' plans and the Lunatacs are sent to destroy the Tower. Snarfer contacts Snarf to tell his uncle that he's returning to Third Earth.
74	4	"Mumm-Ra Lives! Part IV"	Leonard Starr	September 17, 1987	74	74
Mumm-Ra's power is restored. Snarfer makes it to Third Earth, but crashes in Dark Side. The ThunderCats rush to his aid before the Lunatacs can get a hold of him.
75	5	"Mumm-Ra Lives! Part V"	Leonard Starr	September 17, 1987	75	75
The ThunderCats look for Sky Tomb to free the slaves imprisoned inside it. Bengali must learn the importance of teamwork as Lion-O leaves him with guard duty. Lynx-O and Cheetara run reconnaissance to find out if Mumm-Ra is truly back or not.
76	6	"Catfight"	Chris Trengove	September 21, 1987	76	76
By disguising himself as Jaga, Mumm-Ra tricks Lion-O into believing the new ThunderCats are traitors so that they will fight amongst themselves.
77	7	"Psych Out!"	Sandy Fries	September 22, 1987	77	77
Mumm-Ra tells Alluro where to find a talisman that boosts the self-confidence of the one who possesses it so that they become nearly invincible. Snarf learns that true courage comes from within.
78	8	"The Mask of Gorgon"	Romeo Muller	September 23, 1987	78	78
Ma-Mutt digs up an ancient book, which leads Mumm-Ra to search for the ancient evil of the mask of Gorgon.
79	9	"The Mad Bubbler"	Kimberly Morris	September 24, 1987	79	79
The Lunatacs look for Thundrylium in a cave on Hook Mountain, only to be driven mad by a strange creature that turns them against each other.
80	10	"Together We Stand"	Herb Engelhardt	September 25, 1987	80	80
Mumm-Ra coats the Bezerker's weapons and armor with Thundranium and Wilykit and Wilykat find that guarding Cats' Lair is not always a breeze.
81	11	"Ravage Island"	George Hampton and Mike Moore	September 28, 1987	81	81
Mumm-Ra activates a mesmerizing beacon on Ravage Island, which draws the ThunderCats to it and takes hold of their minds.
82	12	"Time Switch"	Sandy Fries	September 29, 1987	82	82
While taking care of a dangerous Suspension Capsule, dug up near Cats' Lair, Lion-O is exposed to harmful gasses inside that cause him grow younger. If the ThunderCats do not find a solution in time, he will rapidly become younger until non-existent.
83	13	"The Sound Stones"	J. Larry Carroll	September 30, 1987	83	83
Vultureman builds a sonic gun from a sound stone he stole in Dark Side as the Lunatacs join with him to attack the Tower of Omens.
84	14	"Day of the Eclipse"	Kimberly Morris	October 1, 1987	84	84
The day of the centennial total eclipse has arrived, and any spell Mumm-Ra casts will last until the next eclipse. He declares a "Day of Decay" on the Cats' Lair, causing it to fall apart.
85	15	"Sideswipe"	William Overgard	October 2, 1987	85	85
Chilla freezes Snarfer's spaceship as he heads back to the Tower of Omens with Berbil Mexican takeout. When Mandora gets involved, Chilla freezes her and becomes a fugitive from the law as Mandora sets her sights on bringing her in.
86	16	"Mumm-Rana's Belt"	James Rose	October 5, 1987	86	86
Luna discovers that her grandmother's magic belt is now in the possession of Mumm-Rana, who claimed it after battle. She heads straight for the white pyramid, with Pumyra hot on her tail.
87	17	"Hachiman's Honor"	J. Larry Carroll	October 6, 1987	87	87
While Hachiman is on his way to the Tower of Omens, Luna steals his sword, the ThunderCutter, and gives it to an automaton. Lion-O and the ThunderKittens head out to find their old friend.
88	18	"Runaways"	Bill Ratter	October 7, 1987	88	88
Fed up of feeling useless, Wilykat convinces his twin to run away from home, but living on their own is more dangerous than they realized. The other ThunderCats search desperately to find them as they all must learn a lesson in communication.
89	19	"Hair of the Dog"	Chris Trengove	October 8, 1987	89	89
While all the ThunderCats except Lion-O are gone, Mumm-Ra switches Ma-Mutt with Snarf. Ma-Mutt poisons Lion-O, allowing Mumm-Ra to move in.
90	20	"Vultureman's Revenge"	Herb Engelhardt	October 9, 1987	90	90
Vultureman builds a Thundranium projector, capable of creating concentrated regions of Thundranium. When the ThunderKittens damage it, he damages their spaceboard, sending them off into danger. While Lion-O and Snarf search desperately for them, Vultureman plans his revenge.

=== Season 3 (1988) ===
No. overall	No. in season	Title	Written by	Original release date	Prod. code	Cartoon Network order
91	1	"ThunderCubs Part I"	Peter Lawrence	September 5, 1988	91	91
Mumm-Ra learns of the treasure of Thundera and the Sword of Plun-darr that destroyed Thundera. He recreates Thundera and travels there whilst the ThunderCats try to find him.
92	2	"ThunderCubs Part II"	Peter Lawrence	September 6, 1988	92	92
After being rescued, the ThunderKittens give a presentation on their observations of New Thundera. Vultureman renovates The Rat Star to ambush the ThunderCats on their way to New Thundera.
93	3	"ThunderCubs Part III"	Peter Lawrence	September 7, 1988	93	93
Mumm-Ra claims the Sword of Plun-darr and nears the treasure of Thundera. The ThunderCats land on New Thundera.
94	4	"ThunderCubs Part IV"	Peter Lawrence	September 8, 1988	94	94
The Mutants arrive and Mumm-Ra has them hide a decoy Book of Omens, leading the ThunderCats in the wrong direction.
95	5	"ThunderCubs Part V"	Peter Lawrence	September 9, 1988	95	95
The ThunderCubs return to Third Earth and join with the ThunderKittens to mount a rescue mission and infiltrate Sky Tomb whilst Lion-O continues to battle Mumm-Ra.
96	6	"Totem of Dera"	J. Larry Carroll	September 12, 1988	96	96
Mumm-Ra recovers the Totem of Dera and learns of its healing powers, which can be used to bring inanimate objects to life. He sends the Mutants out to use it against the ThunderCats.
97	7	"Chain of Loyalty"	Bill Ratter and Peter Lawrence	September 13, 1988	97	97
Whilst studying the Book of Omens, Lion-O learns of the Chain of Loyalty and Jaga instructs him to recover it from New Thundera. When Mumm-Ra breaks the chain, the ThunderCats turn against each other and Lion-O must find a way to stop them from destroying each other.
98	8	"Crystal Canyon"	Sandy Fries	September 14, 1988	98	98
Tygra finds a powerful stone that slowly takes control of his mind. He refuses to listen as Lion-O tries to warn him that the stone is dangerous.
99	9	"The Telepathy Beam"	Kimberly Morris	September 15, 1988	99	99
Vultureman uses a new weapon on Cheetara, overwhelming her sixth sense in an attempt to destroy her confidence and distract her from sensing the truth: Panthro has become a prisoner and was enslaved to upgrade Sky Tomb to be able to make a trip to New Thundera.
100	10	"Exile Isle"	William Overgard	September 16, 1988	100	100
The ThunderCats capture the Lunatacs, put them on trial, and exile them to a desolate planet. However, there is another old enemy of the Thundercats trapped on Exile Isle, with whom the Lunatacs soon team up to plan a destructive return to Third Earth.
101	11	"Key to Thundera"	Matthew Malach	September 19, 1988	101	101
During an attempt to decode the Book of Omens, Lion-O accidentally traps himself within its pages, prompting Mumm-Ra to try to steal the book from Cats' Lair. Meanwhile, Panthro discovers a mysterious key on New Thundera.
102	12	"Return of the ThunderCubs"	J. Larry Carroll	September 20, 1988	102	102
Tygra, Cheetara, and Panthro fall under Mumm-Ra's power on New Thundera, and he tries to use Cheetara's sixth sense to locate the Treasure of Thundera. To rescue his friends, Lion-O must convince the mutants to fly him from Third Earth in The Rat Star.
103	13	"The Formula"	Kimberly Morris	September 21, 1988	103	103
Alluro's new super-fuel formula for Sky Tomb unexpectedly seems to boost the growth of local plant and animal life to massive proportions. Luna orders the mutants to spray it around Cats' Lair, leaving the ThunderCats trapped in a gigantic, savage garden.
104	14	"Locket of Lies"	Bill Ratter	September 22, 1988	104	104
Mumm-Ra creates an evil trinket that the Thundercats mistake for a piece of the Treasure of Thundera. It soon leads them into deep trouble on New Thundera, and nobody is around to rescue them.
105	15	"Bracelet of Power"	Bill Ratter	September 23, 1988	105	105
The Feliner returns from New Thundera with a mysterious bracelet. When Snarf puts it on, he discovers it has the power to turn ThunderCats into his obedient servants. While he toys with this new power, Mumm-Ra plots to steal the bracelet for his own evil purposes.
106	16	"The Wild Workout"	Becky Hartman	September 26, 1988	106	106
The Lunatacs hook up exercise machines to generate power for Sky Tomb's engines, but their own laziness forces them to find Thundercats to do the hard work. Meanwhile, Mumm-Ra plans to lure the ThunderCats into a freezing trap in the Caverns of Cold on New Thundera.
107	17	"The Thunderscope"	George Hampton and Mike Moore	September 27, 1988	107	107
Lion-O and Snarf recover a mysterious telescope from the wreckage of their original spaceship. Mumm-Ra recognizes it as the Thunderscope, which allows its user to locate pieces of the Treasure of Thundera. Lion-O must discover its purpose and keep it out of Mumm-Ra's evil hands.
108	18	"The Jade Dragon"	William Overgard	September 28, 1988	108	108
Mumm-Ra discovers the power of one of the pieces of the treasure of Thundera. The Double-Headed Dragon of Doom, or the Jade Dragon, possesses the power to entrap people in its stomach. The legend says that Hachiman's ancestor gave the dragon to his wife as a marriage gift, and since her father was so against their marriage, he put a curse on the dragon and it engulfed Hachiman's ancestor. Jaga freed him, and he gave the dragon to Jaga for safe keeping. Now, the ThunderCats have found the Jade Dragon, and Mumm-Ra manages to trap Lion-O and Cheetara in it. Hachiman is their only hope.
109	19	"The Circus Train"	William Overgard	September 29, 1988	109	109
Captain Bragg, a bounty hunter, comes to Third Earth to help the Thundercats get rid of the Mutants and the Lunataks. He tricks Wilykat into going with him and they go after the Mutants. After capturing them, they try to capture the Lunataks. They capture all except Luna and Amuk, who free the other Lunataks, put Bragg in a cage, and tie Wilykat to the train's engine.
110	20	"The Last Day"	J. Larry Carroll	September 30, 1988	110	110
Impatient with Mumm-Ra failing them time and time again, the Ancient Spirits of Evil give him one final chance: destroy the ThunderCats within twenty-four hours, or face exile. To this end, he is granted extraordinary power, and grows to a gigantic size. Mumm-Ra spreads destruction all over Third Earth, sends Tygra, Cheetara, and Panthro to limbo, and buries Lion-O alive. He then attacks and destroys the Tower of Omens, and eventually sends the Thunderkittens to limbo too. Snarf goes into the Book of Omens to learn how to defeat Mumm-Ra. Jaga and the other ThunderCats in limbo help free Lion-O and he learns from Snarf that Mumm-Ra only has until sunset to defeat the ThunderCats. Mumm-Ra fails and the Ancient Spirits of Evil banish him from Third Earth.

=== Season 4 (1989) ===
No. overall	No. in season	Title	Written by	Original release date	Prod. code	Cartoon Network order
111	1	"Return to Thundera! Part I"	Peter Lawrence	September 4, 1989	111	111
The Ancient Spirits of Evil give new life to Mumm-Ra and Ma-Mutt, send them to New Thundera, and build a new Pyramid for Mumm-Ra. The ThunderCats say goodbye to Third Earth and depart for Thundera, leaving Tygra and Pumyra behind to watch the Tower of Omens and Cats' Lair. The ThunderCats soon arrive and begin plans to build a new lair. Mumm-Ra, meanwhile, learns that the planet's gravity is controlled by the Gyroscope under the Churning Rocks at the center of the planet. He tries to use this knowledge to destroy the ThunderCats and trick the Gyroscope's guardian, the ancient sorceress Jaguara.
112	2	"Return to Thundera! Part II"	Peter Lawrence	September 5, 1989	112	112
More and more earthquakes are occurring because of the malfunctioning Gyroscope. Meanwhile, Lion-O receives a distress signal from Thunderian refugees, and he, Cheetara, and Snarf go to find them. Mumm-Ra resurrects Grune the Destroyer, and Grune seeks out Lion-O and Cheetara. Grune finds and fights them, breaks the Sword of Omens, and chains them up on the Churning Rocks. Snarf, who was hiding, gathers the pieces of the Sword to take back to Bengali to be fixed. Snarf gets captured by Char, a thief who wants the Sword for himself.
113	3	"Return to Thundera! Part III"	Peter Lawrence	September 6, 1989	113	113
Lion-O, Panthro, and the ThunderKittens take the Whisker, a new flying vehicle, to the Churning Rocks to rescue the Thunderian refugees who called them from there. The ThunderCats get captured by Two-Time, a robot with two heads. Two-Time takes them aboard his spaceship, Dome-Down, and the ThunderCats see that he has also captured the refugees. Lion-O defeats Two-Time and the refugees are freed. Meanwhile, Lynx-O, Cheetara, and Bengali spot Mumm-Ra near the Churning Rocks, and inform Lion-O of this. Lion-O, Panthro, and the ThunderKittens head to the Churning Rocks and confront Mumm-Ra, who is again in the form of Jaga.
114	4	"Return to Thundera! Part IV"	Peter Lawrence	September 7, 1989	114	114
Mumm-Ra sends Ma-Mutt, disguised as Mandora, to free the Mutants from Captain Bragg's circus train and sends Bragg and Crowman falling into deep space. The Mutants are then ordered by Mumm-Ra to get rid of Tygra and Pumyra. The Mutants attack Snowman on Hook Mountain, Snowmeow gets Pumyra for help, and Tygra contacts the real Mandora to save Bragg and Crowman. Together, they recapture the Mutants. Meanwhile, on New Thundera, the earthquake tremors grow worse and the new Cats' Lair collapses, trapping Snarf in the ruins. Lion-O uses the sword to contact the other ThunderCats and they rush to Cats' Lair to save Snarf.
115	5	"Return to Thundera! Part V"	Peter Lawrence	September 8, 1989	115	115
After another earthquake – caused by Mumm-Ra – ruins the new Cats' Lair construction site, the ThunderCats go to see Jaguara and confront Mumm-Ra. Unfortunately, Mumm-Ra puts up a force-field over the Churning Rocks' entrance. Jaga appears to Lion-O and tells him to use the Eye of Thundera to get to Jaguara and the Gyroscope. Lion-O does so and battles Mumm-Ra, who throws him into the bottomless pit underneath the Gyroscope. Lion-O, however, manages to throw his grappling hook to the top, pulling him back up. Lion-O shines the signal and it goes through the force-field. All the ThunderCats leap through the signal, which takes them through the force-field. Together, they fire all their weapons at Mumm-Ra, and he is defeated. Before leaving, Mumm-Ra breaks the cord that holds the Gyroscope above the pit and it falls through. Now, New Thundera is literally falling apart.
116	6	"Leah"	J. Larry Carroll and David Carren	September 11, 1989	116	116
The Ancient Spirits of Evil bring the Mirror Wraith to Mumm-Ra, and he disguises it as a child's toy. Mumm-Ra then intercepts a Thunderian escape pod carrying a little girl, Leah. He gives the toy to Leah, and leaves. She is rescued by the ThunderCats, and goes into New Cats' Lair with the doll.
117	7	"Frogman"	Kimberly Morris	September 12, 1989	117	117
Wilykit and Wilykat are constructing a well for the New Cats' Lair on New Thundera. The ThunderCats on New Thundera receive a distress signal from Thunderian refugees trying to find their way to New Thundera. The ThunderKittens are left alone with Snarf at the New Cats' Lair, and Lion-O and Snarfer are out constructing an early warning device. The rest of the ThunderCats seek out the refugees in space. When Wilykit and Wilykat strike water, they accidentally unleash a monster that Jaga trapped in an underground lake centuries ago.
118	8	"The Heritage"	Bill Ratter and Peter Lawrence	September 13, 1989	118	118
Exploring New Thundera, Wilykit and Wilykat stumble upon a golden orb and pick it up, thinking that it is a part of their Thunderian heritage. Possessed by the power of the Golden Sphere of Seti, the ThunderKittens get greedy, and let the power of the orb overcome them. Mumm-Ra manages to get a hold of the orb, and his powers get four times more powerful.
119	9	"Screwloose"	William Overgard	September 14, 1989	119	119
Jaguara cannot work New Thundera's Gyroscope on her own, so the ThunderCats order a robot to aid her in running it. Screw Loose, a robot who specializes in gyroscopes, comes to New Thundera. Mumm-Ra manages to mess up Screw Loose's brain and he becomes destructive instead of helpful. The ThunderCats must help Jagara get Screw Loose under control, before the entire planet is destroyed.
120	10	"Malcar"	George Hampton and Mike Moore	September 15, 1989	120	120
Mumm-Ra raises Malcar, an ancient alchemist, from the dead. However, the alchemist is old and weak, so Mumm-Ra must restore his youth and power. Malcar regains his powers and uses them against the ThunderCats.
121	11	"Helpless Laughter"	Matthew Malach	September 18, 1989	121	121
A convergence of the Moons of Plun-darr causes a drought on Thundera. Panthro and Snarf go looking for water, then Ezuka – the flying Serpent of Dreary Canal – wanting to get water itself, attacks Panthro and Snarf, causing them to fall into the Swamp of the Laughing Lilypads, and making them laugh uncontrollably. Ezuka attacks the Cats' Lair, still looking for water. Lion-O uses the Sword of Omens to make some rain, and he and Bengali use The ThunderStrike to melt some ice. However, Mumm-Ra comes along and causes a flood.
122	12	"Cracker's Revenge"	William Overgard	September 19, 1989	122	122
Captain Cracker and his mechanical parrot Polly land on Way-Out Back, free the Lunatacs, and put Bragg and Crownan in one of the train's cages. They plan to go to Third Earth to attack it, since most of the ThunderCats are no longer there. Meanwhile, the ThunderCats learn that Cracker has escaped and Snarfer and Mandora go to catch him. Bragg has Crownan ride a fire extinguisher, so he can get into space and get help. Mandora finds him, and the three of them go to Third Earth. Mandora fights with Cracker and the Lunatacs, but is beaten; she and Snarfer are tied to her cycle and sent towards a mountain. Lion-O, Panthro, and Cheetara arrive, and Lion-O saves Mandora and the others. Meanwhile, Cracker and the Lunatacs go to attack Cats' Lair.
123	13	"The Mossland Monster"	Chris Trengove	September 20, 1989	123	123
Tygra, on a solo trip to New Thundera to meet the other ThunderCats, decides to take a shortcut through a meteor shower. His ship is damaged, and he lands on an unexplored region of New Thundera: The Moss-Land. It turns out that the moss in Moss-Land is part of a giant monster. The Moss Monster captures Tygra with its moss. Lion-O and Bengali set out to save Tygra and battle the Moss Monster.
124	14	"Ma-Mutt's Confusion"	Beth Bornstein	September 21, 1989	124	124
Mumm-Ra has a new device, the Babylonian Barbarian Boiler, that he plans to use on Cats' Lair. Ma-Mutt fools around too much and Mumm-Ra banishes him from the Pyramid. Later, the ThunderKittens, Snarf, and Snarfer bring Ma-Mutt back to Cats' Lair. Mumm-Ra fires the Boiler's beam at the Cats' Lair, which causes it to start melting. Snarfer makes a communicating device – Ma-Mutt was trying to tell them about the Boiler's beam – so they can understand Ma-Mutt. Ma-Mutt starts telling them about the Boiler, but Mumm-Ra sees this; through the Cauldron's magic, he brings Ma-Mutt back to the Pyramid.
125	15	"Shadowmaster"	Dennis J. Woodyard	September 22, 1989	125	125
From the Shadow Realm, the Shadowmaster contacts the Ancient Spirits of Evil, telling them how he captured Lion-O's father, Claudus, just before Thundera blew up. The Shadowmaster, through a bad dream, shows Lion-O his captured father and challenges Lion-O to a fight. Lion-O goes to the Shadow Realm through the Book and Sword of Omens, and is able to fight the Shadowmaster as long as the Sword stays bonded to the book. However, the Shadowmaster sends a huge bat to steal the Sword. It succeeds, and then Lion-O becomes very weak in the Shadow Realm. Mumm-Ra, meanwhile, feeling like the Spirits will turn against him in favor of the Shadowmaster, sends Ma-Mutt to secretly steal the sword from the bat and put it back near the book. This will be crucial to Lion-O's triumph in the Shadow Realm.
126	16	"Swan Song"	William Overgard	September 25, 1989	126	126
An Ecology Inspector comes to New Thundera to inspect the New Cats' Lair. His ship uses the Space Way Airborn Navigations (SWAN) system to direct him to planets all over the universe. When he arrives on New Thundera, he gets ambushed by Two-Time. Two-Time uses a hologram to make the Inspecotor's ship crash into a mountain, and when the ThunderCats come to rescue the Inspector in the Feliner, Two-Time uses the hologram again. Lion-O manages to fly around the mountain and lands the Feliner. Meanwhile, Two-Time flies to New Cats' Lair in his spaceship, Dome-Down. He picks up the whole Lair and keeps it inside Dome-Down.
127	17	"Touch of Amortus"	Bill Ratter	September 26, 1989	127	127
Mumm-Ra orders Amortus, a being he banished to the Land of No Return centuries earlier, to destroy Lynx-O. Amortus makes Lynx-O crash in the ThunderStrike, and then he touches Lynx-O's face. The spell from the touch makes Lynx-O feel like he is an outcast, so he leaves to join Amortus in the Land of No Return. Lion-O, Panthro, and Cheetara go after him. In the Land of No Return, Amortus again touches Lynx-O, this time causing him to turn to stone. The other ThunderCats arrive and try to beat Amortus, but he touches all of them, causing them to start turning to stone. Just as Lion-O is about to turn entirely to stone, he calls the Sword and it breaks them free.
128	18	"The Zaxx Factor"	Matthew Malach	September 27, 1989	128	128
Vultureman escapes from exile by hijacking a bookmobile. He finds a disk containing ancient history about two powerful evil forces on Third Earth: Mumm-Ra and his enemy Zaxx. Using this information, Vultureman plots to defeat Mumm-Ra and rule the universe.
129	19	"Well of Doubt"	Dennis J. Woodyard	September 28, 1989	129	129
The ThunderCats use a new Tower signal to guide a Thunderian ship in; aboard are Baron Tass and Mr. Grubber, a devious pair of Thunderians. Later, Lion-O sends Torr, Baron Tass and Mr. Grubber to get water. On the way, the Baron stops at the Well of Doubt and gets some of its water, which causes a person to become very doubtful of his own abilities. When they get back to the ThunderCats, Baron Tass gives some of the water to Lion-O. On the way to inspecting the new Tower in the Whisker, Lion-O feels the effects of the water and causes the Whisker to crash. Tass comes back after getting his Guardsman – giant stone-men – and has them attack the ThunderCats.
130	20	"The Book of Omens"	William Overgard	September 29, 1989	130	130
Finally, Panthro deciphers how to use the Key of Omens. He enters the code to open the lock and the Guardian of Omens is suddenly summoned. It tells the ThunderCats they have twenty-four hours to present both the Key and four other items to the four places in disgrace – i.e., plagued by geological disasters – all over New Thundera. Everything was proceeding correctly except for the Key, which Mumm-Ra stole. However, Mumm-Ra enters the Book of Omens just when Lion-O finds him, and they battle inside the Book. This presented a satisfying finale for the complete series, albeit one with an open ending.
