= Chris Jennings (journalist) =

American journalist and author

Chris Jennings is an American journalist and author. He is a former editorial staffer at The New Yorker. He is a graduate of Deep Springs College and Wesleyan University.

== Books ==
- Paradise Now: The Story of American Utopianism (2016)
- End of Days: Ruby Ridge, The Apocalypse, and the Unmaking of America (Little, Brown, 2026)
