= Paper Recordings =

British record label

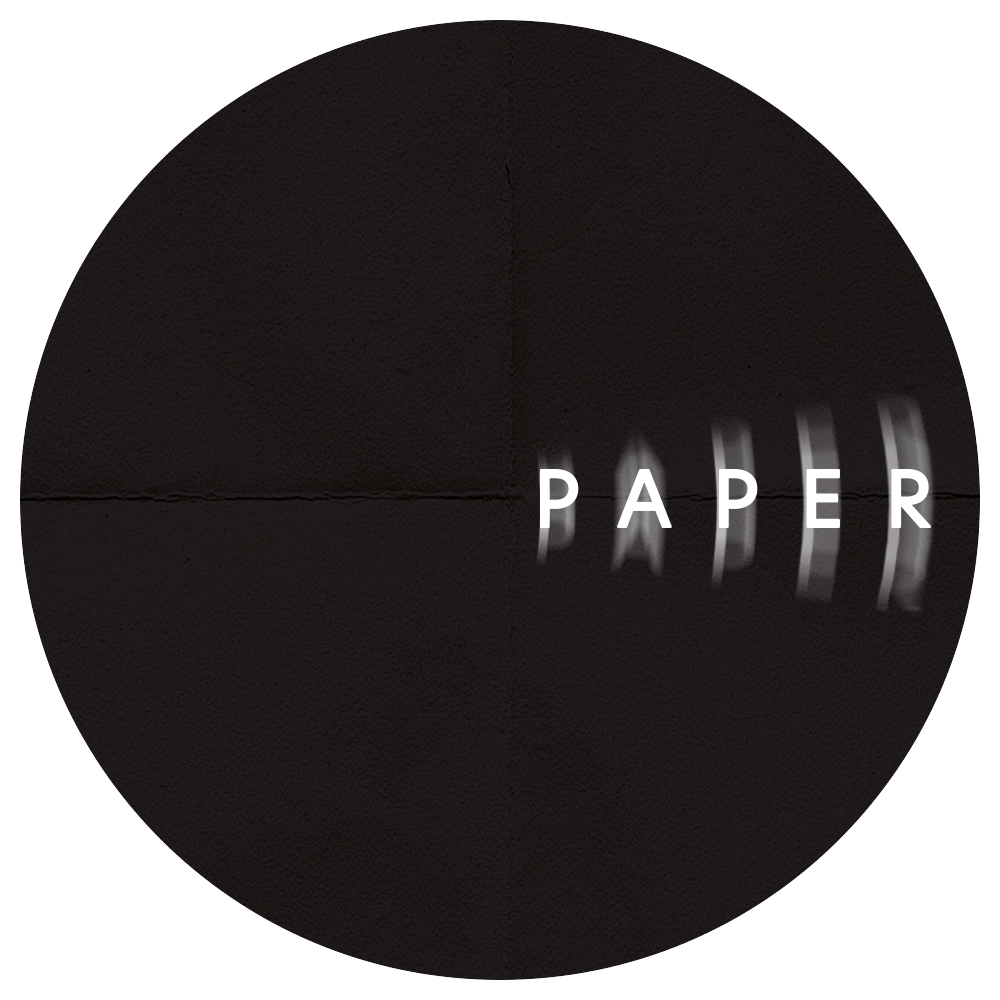
- Trade name: Paper Recordings & Paper Vision Films
- Industry: Electronic dance music, documentary film production
- Genre: Deep House, Nu-disco
- Founded: 1993 in Manchester, UK
- Fate: Active
- Brands: Paper Recordings, Paper Vision Films, Robodisco, Repap Records, Paper Wave, Paper Disco, We Are Woodville Records
- Website: paperecordings.com

Paper Recordings is a Manchester based record company. It released electronic dance music from an international roster of recording artists and music producers that integrated the genres of house, funk, jazz, techno and soul. According to Mixmag and The Quietus it was part of the UK Nu-disco genre in the late 1990s and 2000s along with record labels Nuphonic, Glasgow Underground Recordings and Leeds based 20/20 Vision recordings.

== History ==
Founded in 1993 by Pete Jenkinson, Ben Davis, Miles Hollway, Elliot Eastwick, Andrew Gough and Stephen Page while working at The Hacienda and Hard Times club nights. The label has released over 2000 recordings, by over 200 artists, producers, and remixers in over 50 countries across imprints Paper Recordings, BOM Disques, Paper Disco, Paper Wave, Repap Records and We Are Woodville Records.

In 1997, Paper Recordings released the debut album from Tromsø band Those Norwegians, comprising Rune Lindbæk, Ole Johan Mjøs and Torbjørn Brundtland who went on to form Röyksopp with Svein Berge. This album was titled Kaminsky Park, a pun on Comiskey Park that witnessed the Disco Demolition Night protests in 1979 and with its LP artwork depicting a burnt and warped 12" vinyl.

Musicians, artists and producers that have worked with the label includes Crazy P, Rasmus Faber, Xpress 2, Derrick Carter, Eddie 'Flashin' Fowlkes, Ashley Beedle, Greg Wilson, Silicone Soul, Ladytron, Kenny Hawkes, Two Lone Swordsmen (Andrew Weatherall and Keith Tennison), Derrick Carter, Håkan Lidbo, Mike Watt (Minutemen), Andy Votel, Basil Clarke (Yargo), Faze Action, Richard Norris, Matthew Herbert, Zed Bias, Ralph Myerz, Mike Lindsay (Tunng), Jane Weaver, Ian Pooley, Kathy Diamond, Anoraak, Bill Brewster and Mathias Stubø (Proviant Audio).

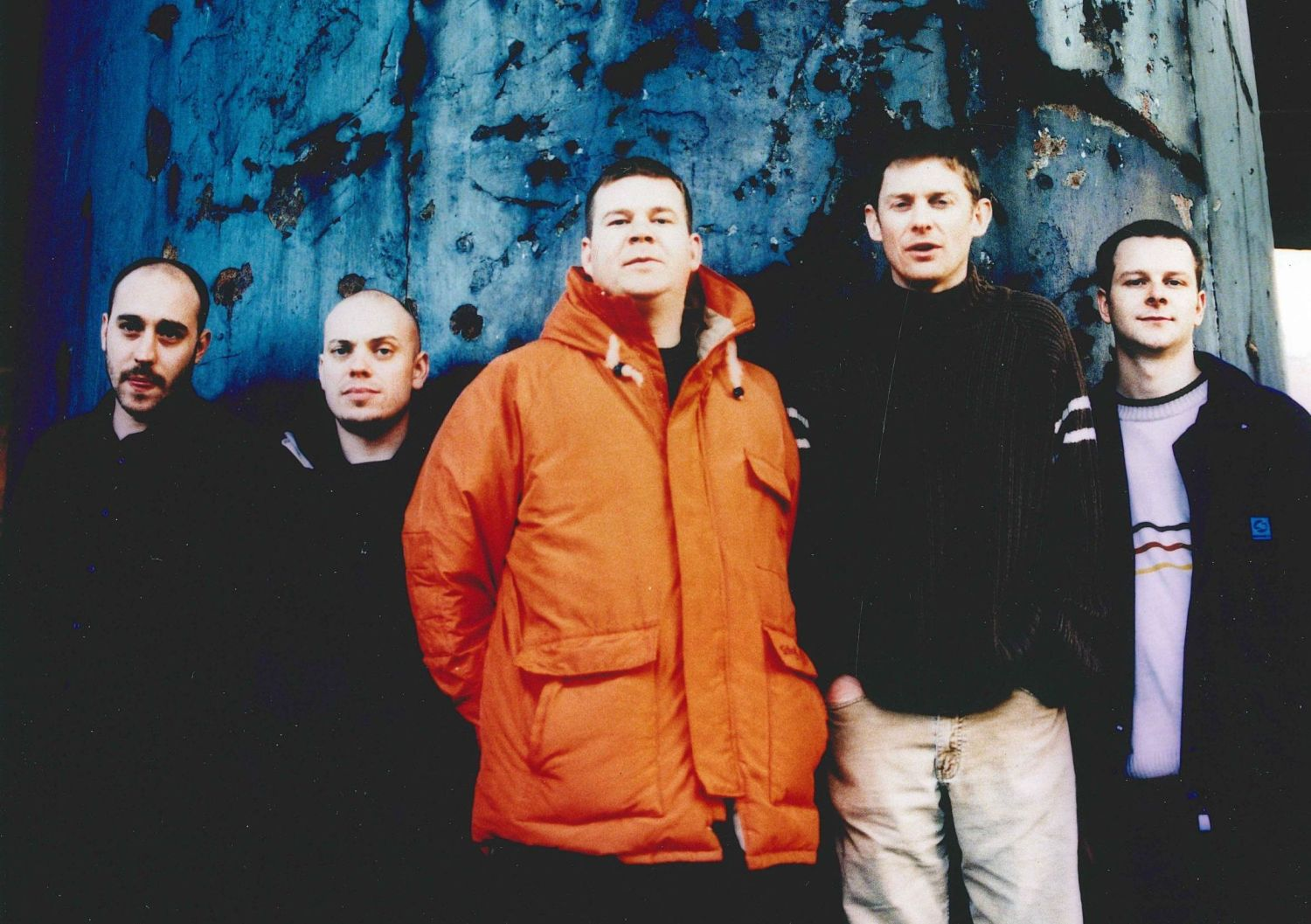
Castlefield, Manchester, 1997

== Club Nights ==
Robodisco was a club night associated with the label, hosting dance parties between 1996 and 2005 at venues including Sankeys Soap, Paradise Factory, Planet K, South Nightclub, PJ Bells, along with associated events Sonic Tonic, Out to Lunch at The Roadhouse and State respectively.

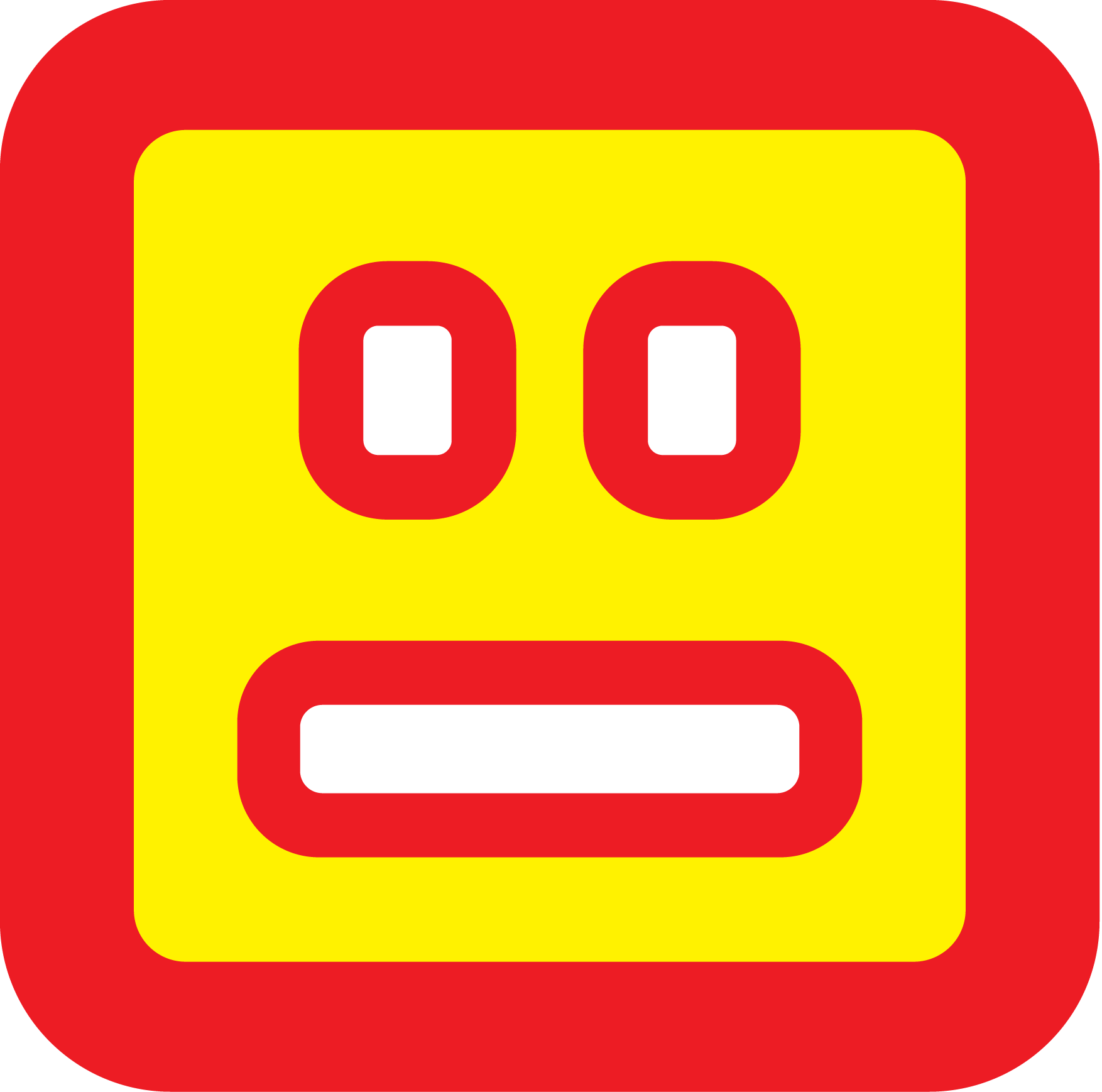
Robodisco Logo, 1997

== Paper Vision Films ==
A film production company founded in 2014 produced 'Northern Disco Lights - The Rise and Rise of Norwegian Dance Music' investigating the emergence of the Nordic dance music scene premiering at Bergen International Film Festival in 2016. The documentary features interviews with Bryan Ferry, Lindstrøm, Annie, Per Martinsen, Prins Thomas, Bjørn Torske and Nemone. The film screened at film festivals in cities including Tromsø, London, Oslo, Bergen, Kyiv, Svalbard, Berlin, Alaska, Copenhagen, Stockholm, Baku, Tbilisi, Turin, Prague and Manchester. A second documentary Wild Water focused on the wild swimming community at England’s highest beach, Gaddings Dam in West Yorkshire, UK.
