= Bowyer (surname) =

Bowyer (/ˈboʊjər/ BOH-yər) is an English surname, taken from the traditional craftsman name bowyer, a maker of bows, unlike "Bowman", 'archer'. Notable people with the surname include:

== A–J ==
- Adrian Bowyer (born 1952), English engineer and mathematician
- Ashley Bowyer (born 1988), American soccer player
- Bernadette Bowyer (born 1966), Canadian field hockey player
- Bertram Bowyer, 2nd Baron Denham (1927–2021), British peer and politician
- Brendan Bowyer (1938–2020), Irish singer
- Charles Stuart Bowyer (1934–2020), American astronomer and academic
- Chaz Bowyer (1926–2008), British Royal Air Force armaments and explosives instructor
- Clint Bowyer (born 1979), American racing driver
- Dean Bowyer, American baseball coach
- Edmund Bowyer (died 1627), English lawyer, landowner and politician
- Edmund Bowyer (died 1681), English politician
- Eric Bowyer, Northern Irish footballer
- Frank Bowyer (1922–1999), English footballer
- Frank C. Bowyer, Businessman and mayor of Tampa, Florida
- Gary Bowyer (born 1971), English football player and coach
- George Bowyer (pilot) (1859–1945), British harbour pilot
- George Bowyer (singer), British musician
- Glen Bowyer (born 1979), Australian rules footballer
- Goof Bowyer (1903–1988), American football player and coach
- Gordon Arthur Bowyer (1923–2019), British Architect
- Henry Bowyer (1786–1853), British politician
- Ian Bowyer (born 1951), English footballer
- Jerry Bowyer (born 1962), American political writer
- John Bowyer (MP for Derby) (fl. 1383), English politician,
- John Bowyer (MP for Wells) (fl. 1404), English politician
- John Bowyer (MP for Steyning) (bef. 1504 – bef. 1555), English politician
- John Bowyer (cricketer) (1790–1880), English cricketer
- John M. Bowyer (1853–1912), United States admiral

== K–W ==
- Kevin Bowyer (born 1961), English organist
- Lee Bowyer (born 1977), English footballer and manager
- Matthew Bowyer (born 1973), English cricketer
- Michael Bowyer (1599–1645), actor in English Renaissance theatre
- Michelle Bowyer (born 1976), Canadian field hockey player
- Percy Bowyer (1909–1998), Australian rules footballer
- Philip Henry Bowyer (1860–1933), Canadian politician
- Richard Bowyer (MP) (died 1550s), English politician
- Richard Bowyer (priest) (died 1471), Canon of Windsor
- Robert Bowyer (1758–1834), British miniature painter and publisher
- Robert Bowyer (diarist) (1560s–1621), English politician and diarist
- Robert Bowyer (died 1551 or 1552), English politician
- Robert Bowyer II (died c. 1568), English politician
- Ruth Bowyer (c. 1761 – 1788), English convict
- Sam Bowyer (1887–1961), English footballer
- Simon Bowyer (c. 1550 – 1606), English politician
- Theresa Bowyer, Former Women's Editor of Daily Times of Nigeria
- Tommy Bowyer (footballer) (1895–1940), English footballer
- Travis Bowyer (born 1981), American baseball player
- Ursula Bowyer (1925–2025), German-born British architect
- Walt Bowyer (born 1960), American football player
- William Bowyer (Keeper of the Records) (died 1596/70), English MP
- William Bowyer (died 1628), English soldier and administrator
- William Bowyer (MP) (1588–1641), English politician
- William Bowyer (1663–1737), English printer
- William Bowyer (printer) (1699–1777), English printer
- William Bowyer (artist) (1926–2015), British painter

== See also ==
- Bowyer (disambiguation)
