= William Bowyer =

William Bowyer may refer to:

== Politicians ==
- William Bowyer (15th century MP), in 1411 MP for Newcastle-under-Lyme
- William Bowyer (died 1602), MP for Stafford
- William Bowyer (Keeper of the Records), MP for Westminster and Keeper of the Records in the Tower
- William Bowyer (died 1616), MP for Carlisle, Dunheved and Appleby
- William Bowyer (died 1628), Captain and Mayor of Berwick
- William Bowyer (MP) (c. 1588–1641), MP for Staffordshire
- Sir William Bowyer, 1st Baronet (1612–1679), English MP for Buckinghamshire

== Others ==
- William Bowyer (1663–1737), British printer
- William Bowyer (printer) (1699–1777), his son, British printer
- William Bowyer (artist) (1926–2015), British portrait and landscape painter

== See also ==
- Sir William Bowyer-Smijth, 11th Baronet (1814–1883), British MP for South Essex
- Bowyer (surname)
