= Thomas Bowyer =

Thomas Bowyer may refer to:

- Sir Thomas Bowyer, 1st Baronet (1586–1650), English politician
- Thomas Bowyer (died 1595), MP for Midhurst
- Sir Thomas Bowyer, 2nd Baronet (1609–1659) of the Bowyer baronets
- Thomas Bowyer (martyr) (died 1556), one of the Stratford Martyrs during the Marian persecutions
- Tommy Bowyer (footballer) (1895–1940), English footballer

== See also ==
- Bowyer (surname)
