= Lyman filament extruder =

3D printer filament extruder for raw materials

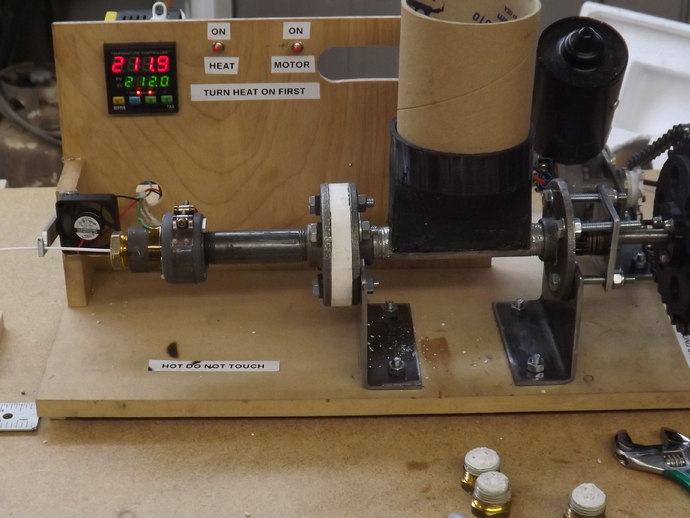

The Lyman filament extruder is a device for making 3D printing filament suitable for use in 3-D printers like the RepRap. It is named after its developer Hugh Lyman and was the winner of the Desktop Factory Competition.

The goal in the competition was to build an open source filament extruder for less than $250 in components that can take ABS or PLA resin pellets, mix them with colorant, and extrude enough 1.75 mm diameter ± 0.05 mm filament that can be wrapped on a 1 kg spool. The machine must use the Attribution-ShareAlike 3.0 Unported (CC BY-SA 3.0) license.

The use of DIY filament extruders like the Lyman can significantly reduce the cost of printing with 3-D printers. The Lyman filament extruder was designed to handle pellets, but can also be used to make filament from other sources of plastic such as post-consumer waste like other RecycleBots. Producing plastic filament from recycled plastic has a significant positive environmental impact.
