= George Bowyer =

George Bowyer may refer to:

- Sir George Bowyer, 5th Baronet (1740–1800), British naval officer and member of parliament (MP) for Queenborough
- Sir George Bowyer, 6th Baronet (1783–1860), British Whig MP for Malmesbury and Abingdon
- Sir George Bowyer, 7th Baronet (1811–1883), British barrister and Liberal MP for Dundalk and Wexford County
- George Bowyer, 1st Baron Denham (1886–1948), British Conservative MP for Buckingham and Comptroller of the Household
- George Bowyer (singer), British singer
- George Bowyer (pilot), British Trinity House harbour pilot
