= Hangprinter =

Open-source 3D printer design

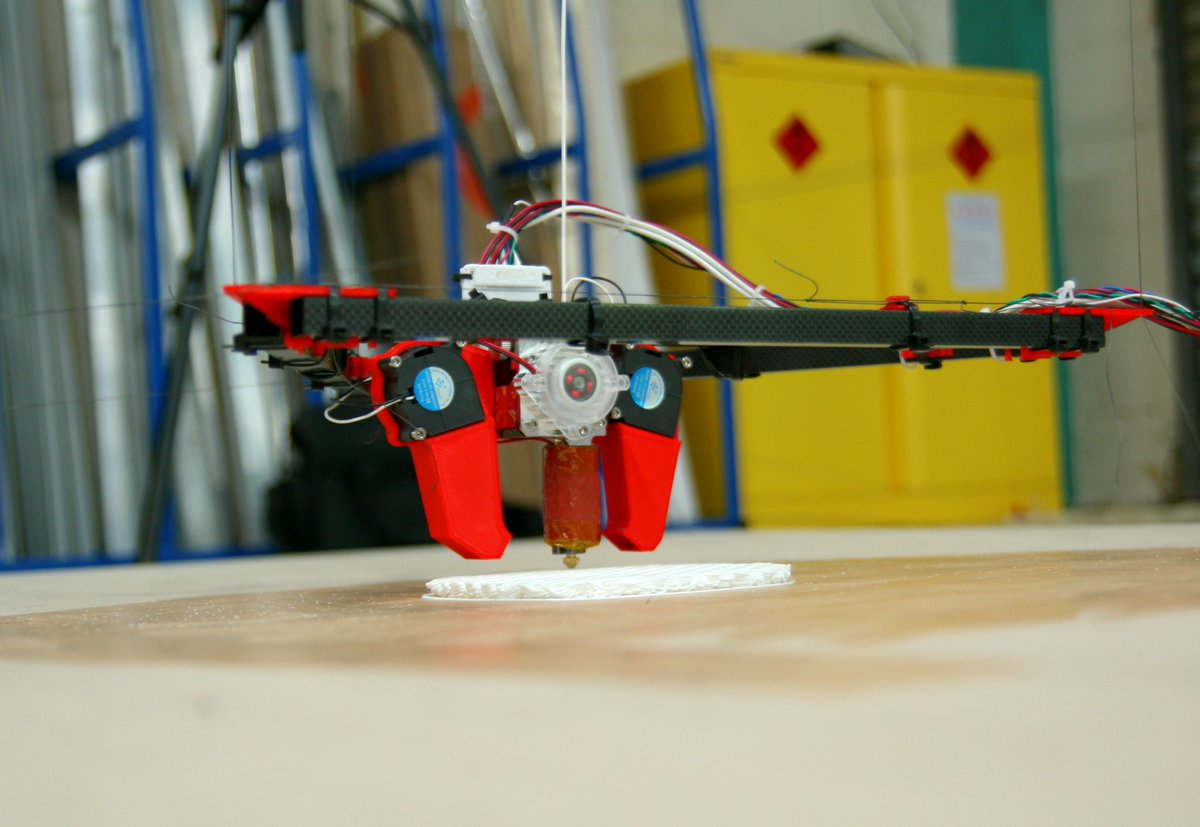
- Hangprinter version 3
- Video about the Hangprinter
- Classification: Fused deposition modeling 3D printer
- Inventor: Torbjørn Ludvigsen

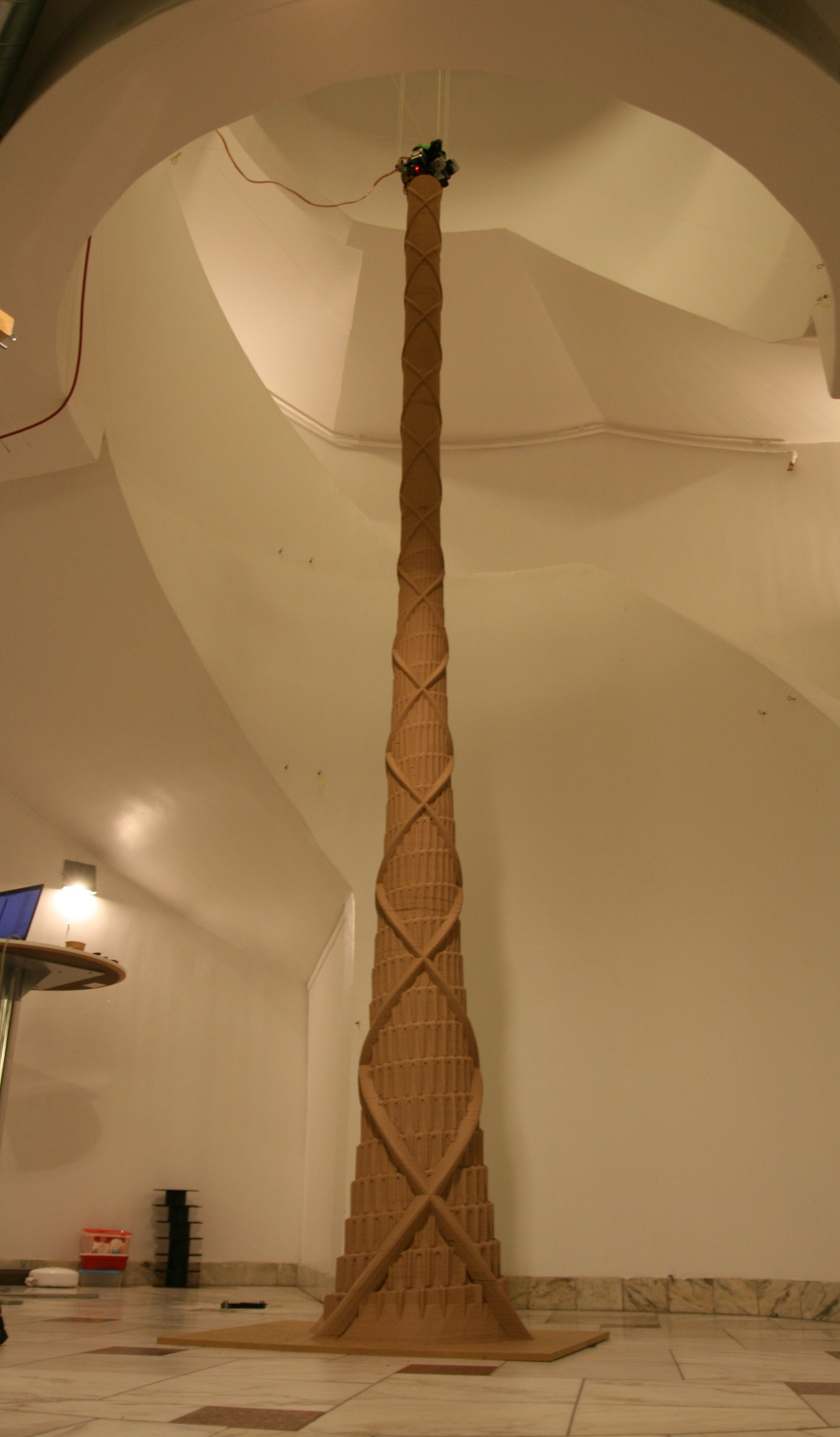
A 4-meter-high Tower of Babel printed by Hangprinter.

Hangprinter is an open-source fused deposition modeling delta 3D printer notable for its unique frameless design. It was created by Torbjørn Ludvigsen residing in Sweden. The Hangprinter uses relatively low cost parts and can be constructed for around US$250. The printer is part of the RepRap project, meaning many of the parts of the printer are able to be produced on the printer itself (partially self replicating). The design files for the printer are available on GitHub for download, modification and redistribution.

== Versions ==
=== Version 0 ===
The Hangprinter v0, also called the Slideprinter, is a 2D plotter. It was designed solely to test if a 3D version could realistically be created.

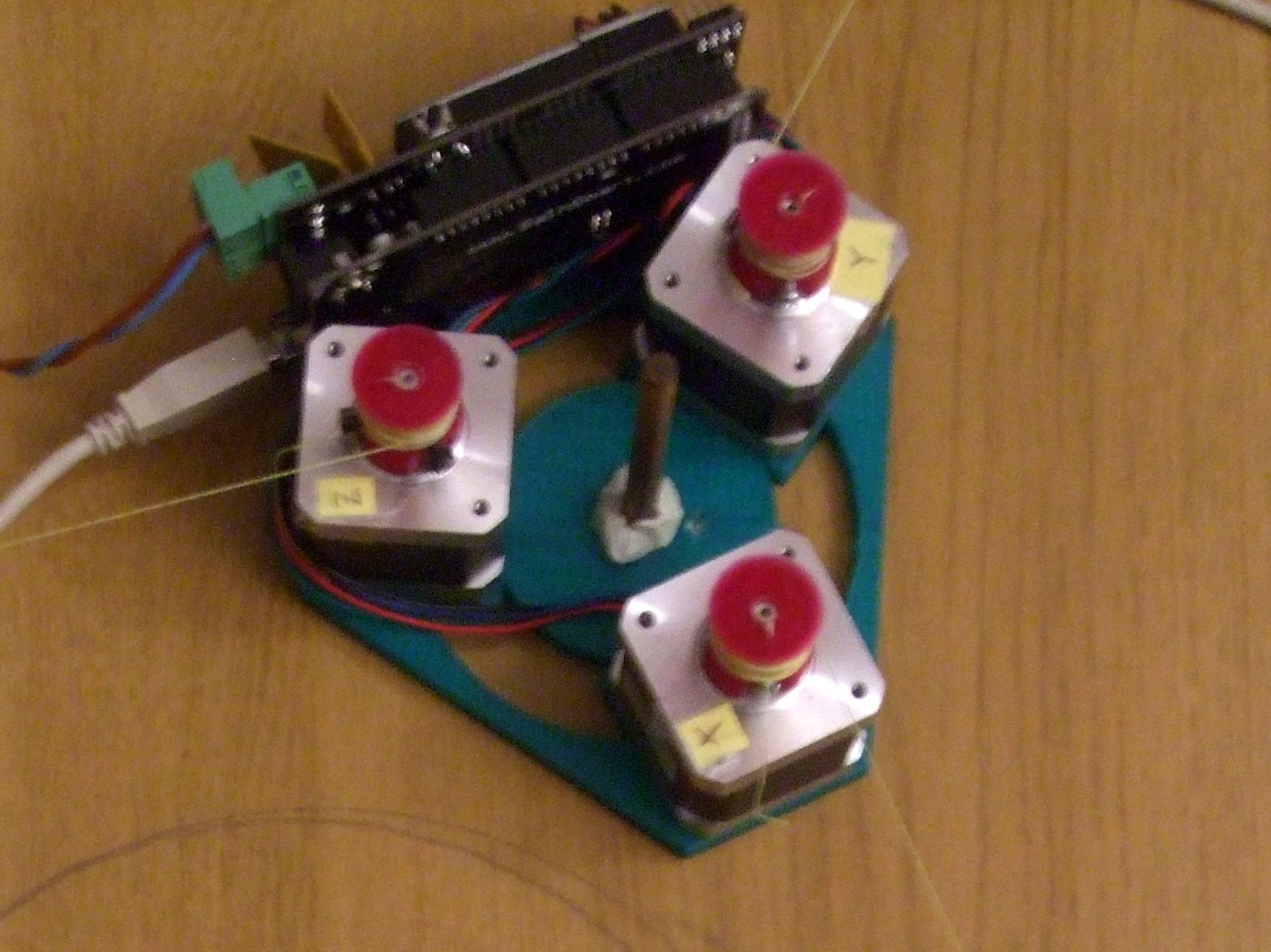
Hangprinter v0

=== Version 1 ===
The Hangprinter v1 uses counter weights to stay elevated.

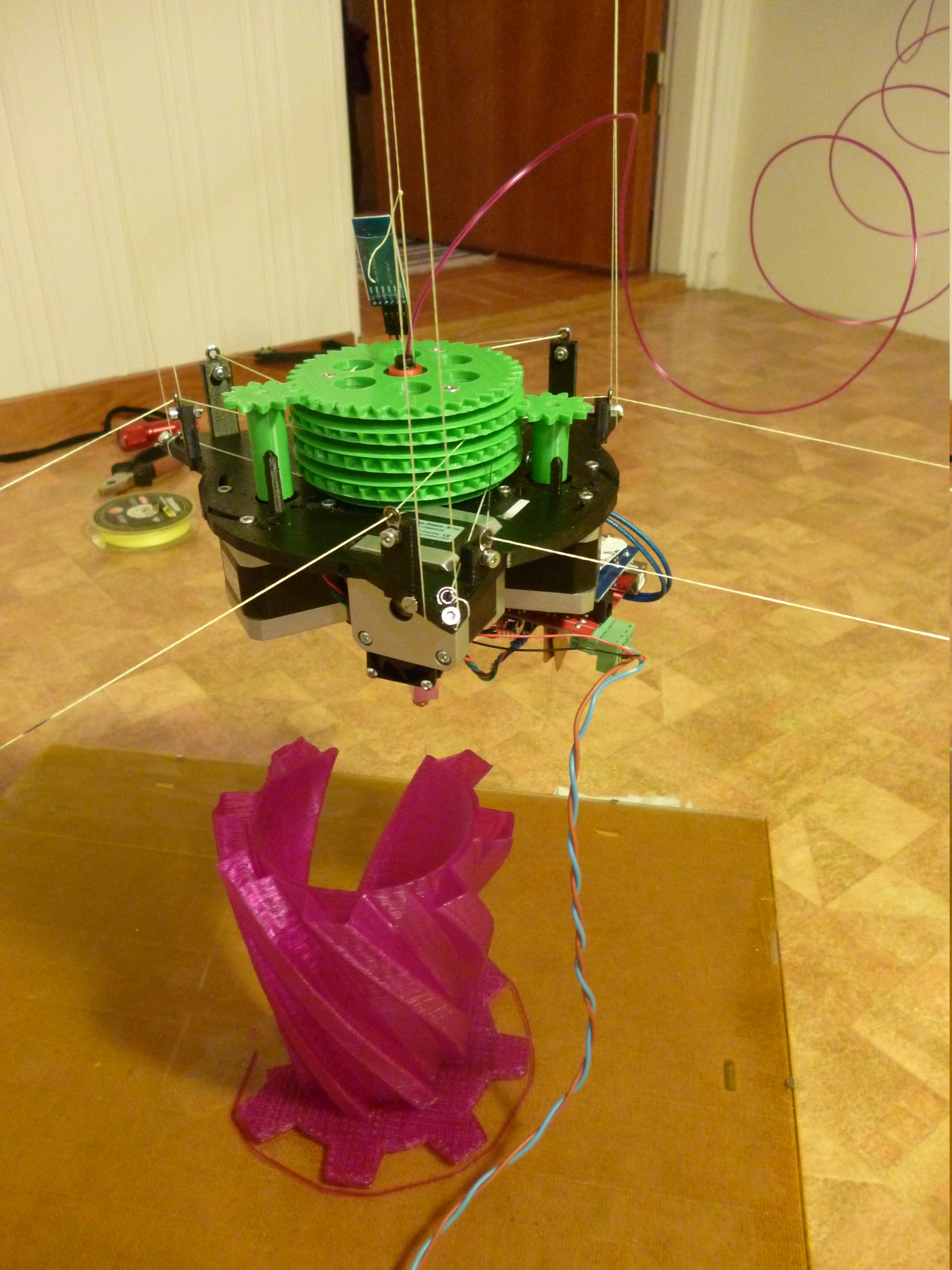
Hangprinter v1. Counterweights tied in at its center cylinder.

=== Version 2 ===
All parts of the Hangprinter Version 2 are contained within a single unit which uses cables to suspend the printer within a room, allowing it to create extremely large objects over 4 meters tall.

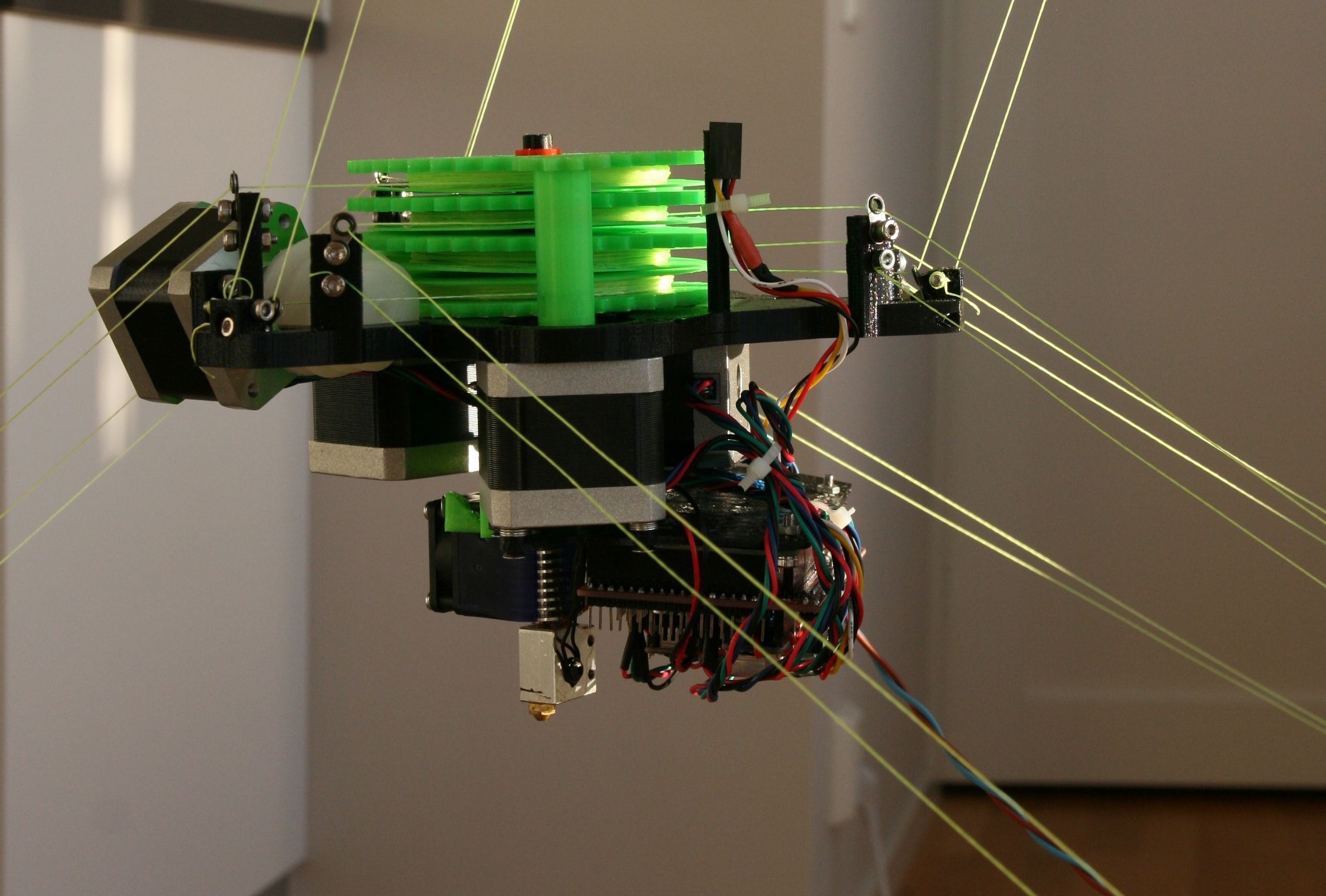

=== Version 3 ===
Version 3 of the Hangprinter has the motors and gears attached to the ceiling, making the carriage lighter.

Hangprinter printing at the offices of E3D Online

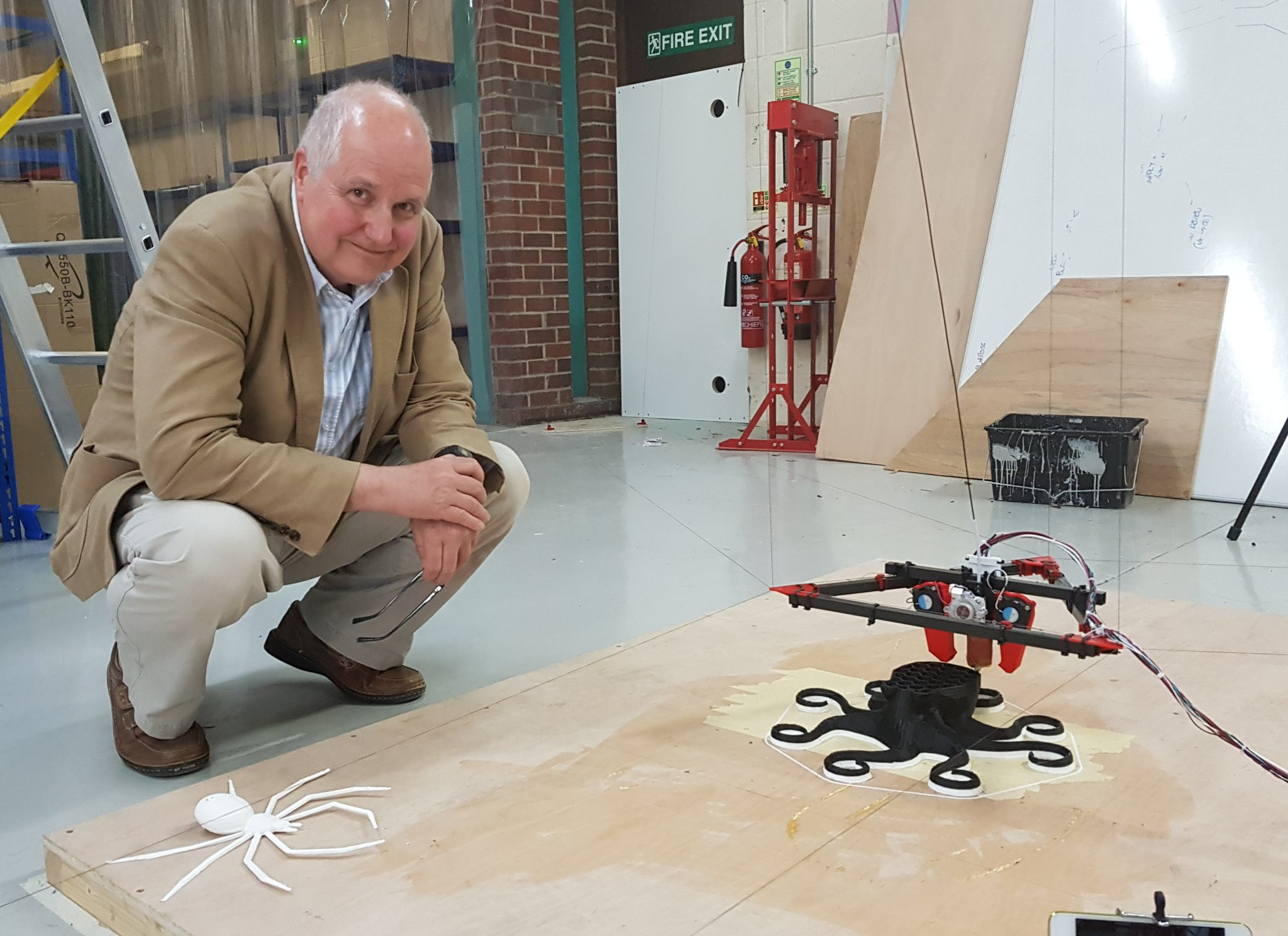
Adrian Bowyer with a Hangprinter

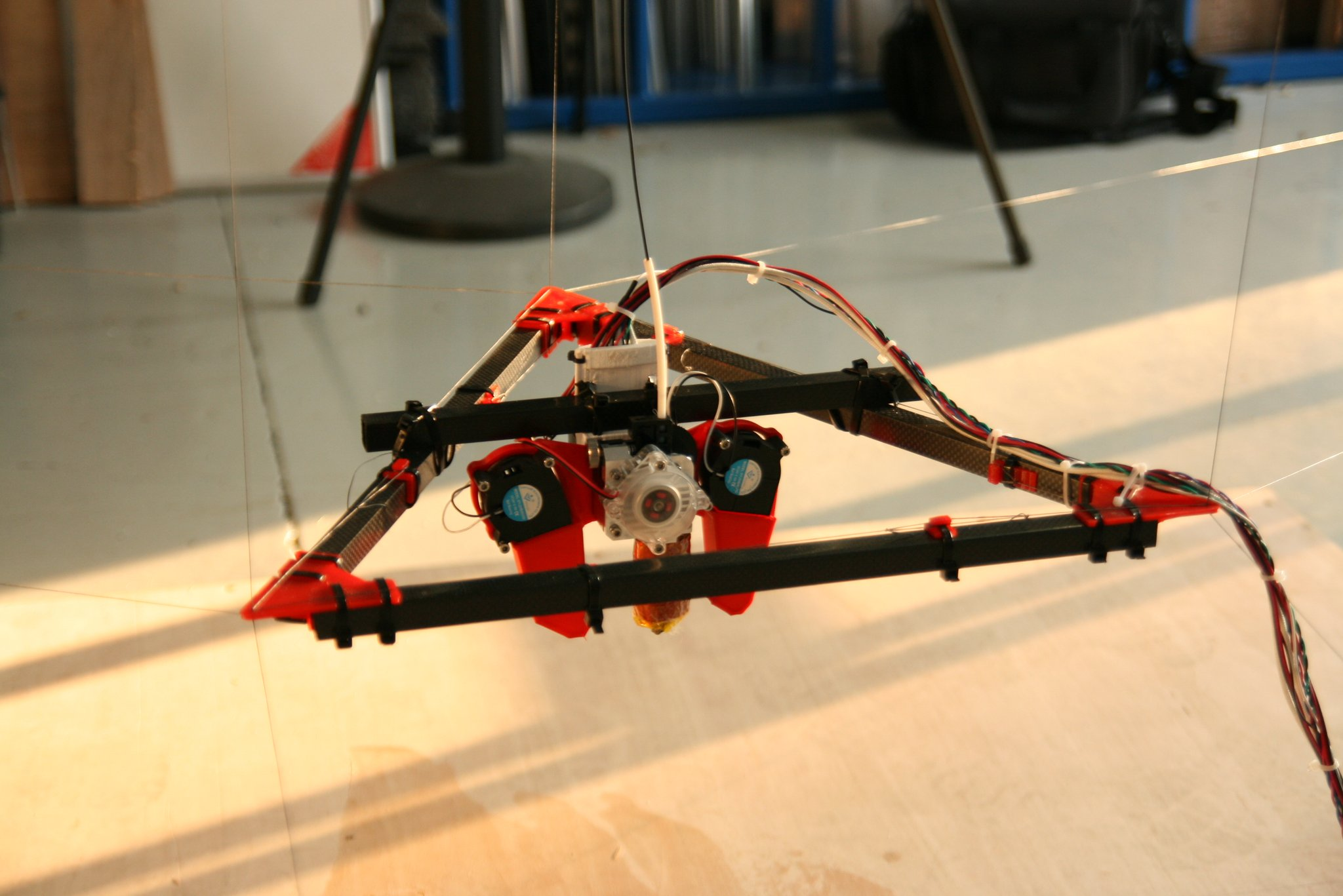
Hangprinter v3 suspended

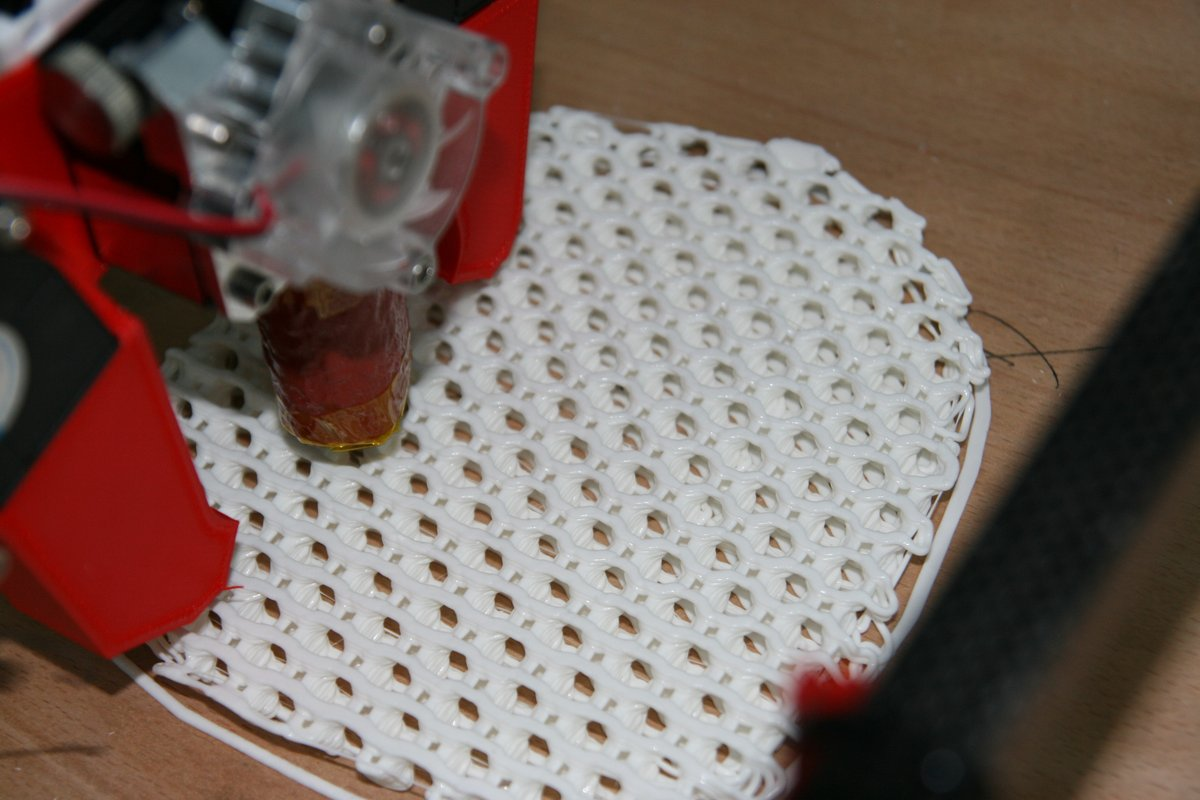
Close up of Hangprinter v3 printing

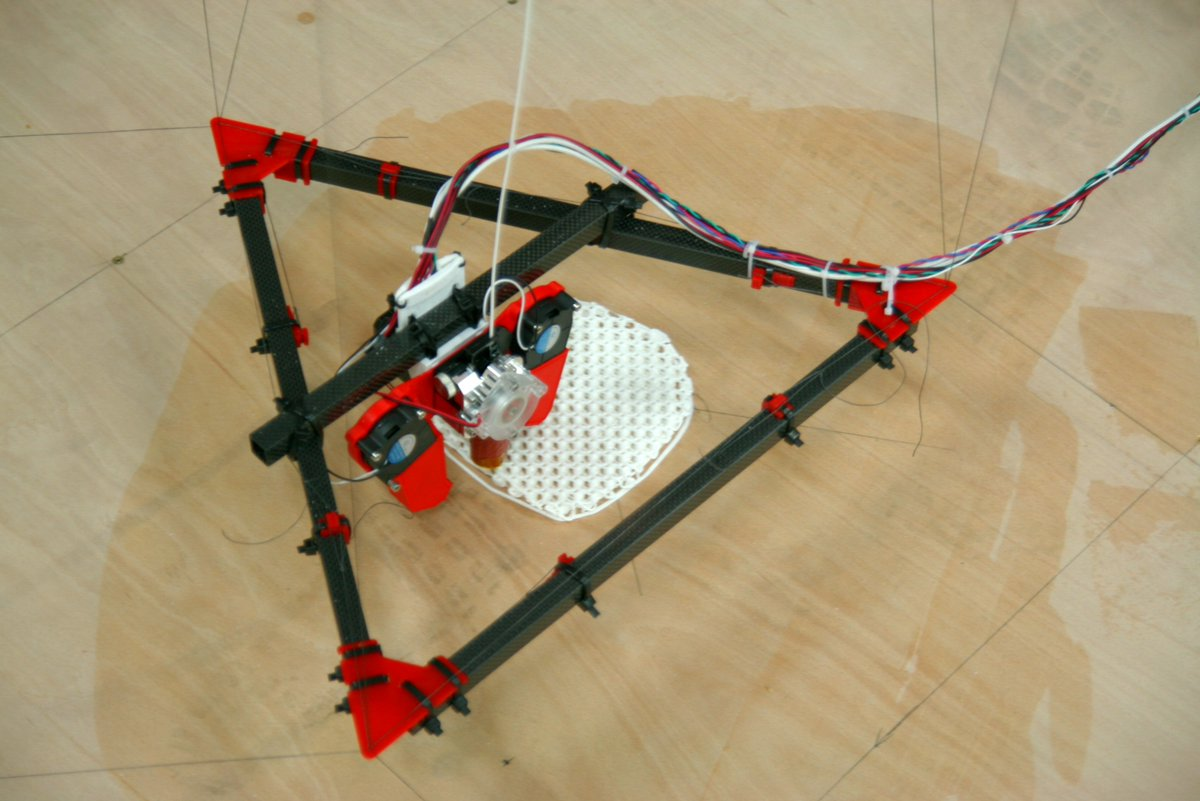
View of entire carriage whilst printing

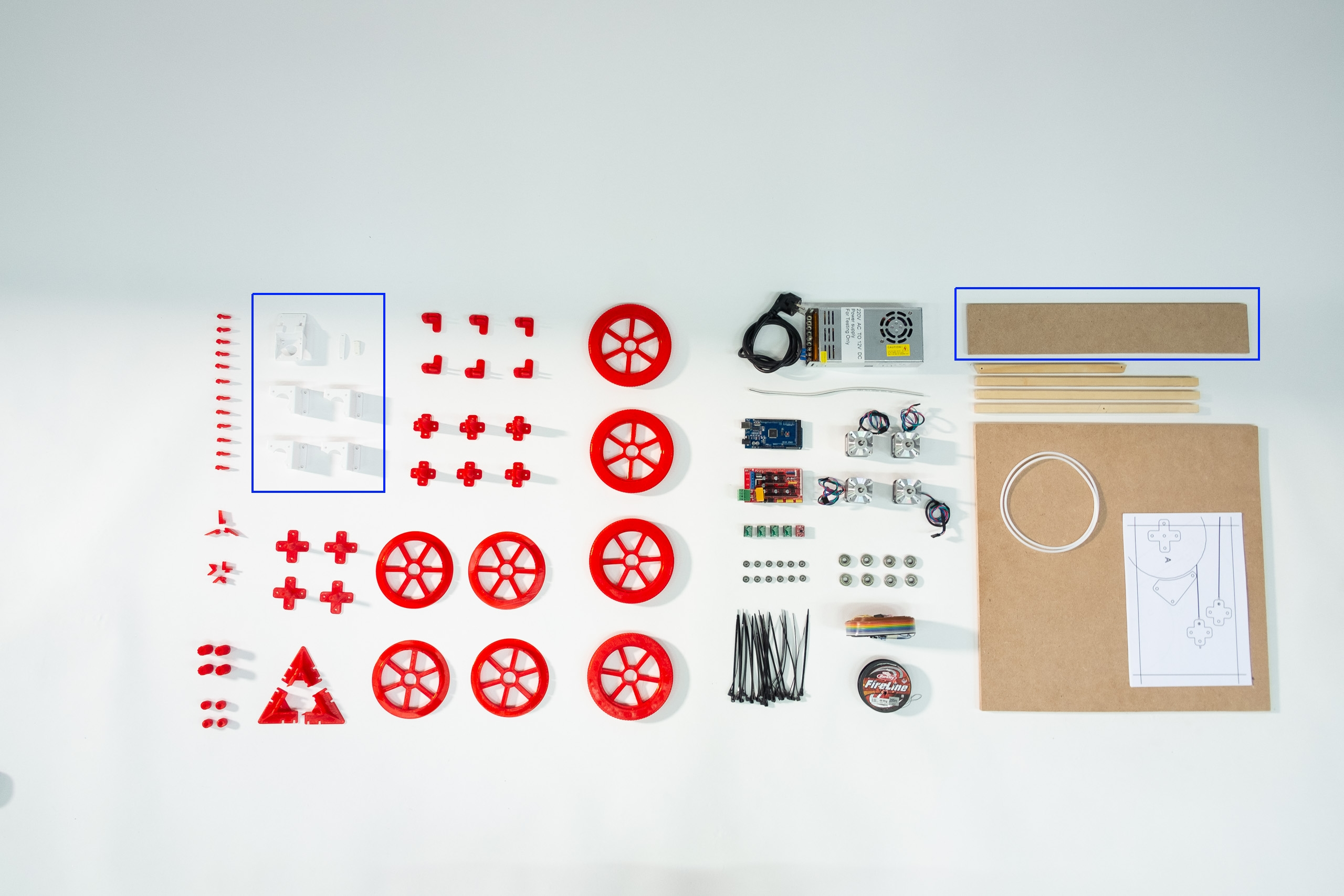
Components of the Hangprinter V3. The red parts and the white parts in the blue box are 3D printed.

=== Version 4 ===
Version 4 includes upgrades from version 3 including flex compensation, better calibration and automatic homing.

Two 3DBenchys being printed on a Hangprinter

=== Fused Particle Fabrication/Fused Granular Fabrication Hangprinters ===
To enable 3D printers to economically use recycled plastic feedstocks to enable distributed recycling and additive manufacturing (DRAM) several types of fused granular fabrication (FGF)/fused particle fabrication (FPF) -based 3D printers have been designed and released with open source licenses. First, a large-scale printer was demonstrated with a GigabotX extruder based on the open source cable driven hangprinter concept. Then detailed plans using recyclebot auger techniques were released in HardwareX to build such a printer for under $1700. This approach would further reduce the cost of using hangprinters to make large scale products as the cost of recycled shredded plastic is ~$1–5/kg while filament is generally around $20/kg. Makers that have built open source granulators or have access to other types of waste plastic shredders (e.g. from Precious Plastic) can generate feedstock for hanging waste printers for under $1/kg, which makes large scale production with a hangprinter competitive with any conventional manufacturing process.

== Patent dispute ==
In 2022, a patent describing the "Sky Big Area Additive Manufacturing" (SkyBAAM) system was granted to UT-Battelle, LLC, a nonprofit corporation that operates the Oak Ridge National Laboratory (ORNL). The patent describes the core features already featured in HangPrinter, causing controversy in the open source community. The RepRap project established a GoFundMe campaign to cover the legal costs in their upcoming action to challenge the patent.

In May 2023 it was announced that the US Patent Office rejected the wide claims of the SkyBAAM patent and would be settling on a much narrower patent instead. Per a post on Torbjørn Ludvigsen's blog "They largely agreed with our analysis. They rejected all the patent's original claims. They accepted a narrower version of them." Per the interpretation provided in that post the narrower patent would only cover cases where every detail provided is included in the design, instead of those designs with any of the described details.
