= 3DBenchy =

Benchmark model for testing 3D printers

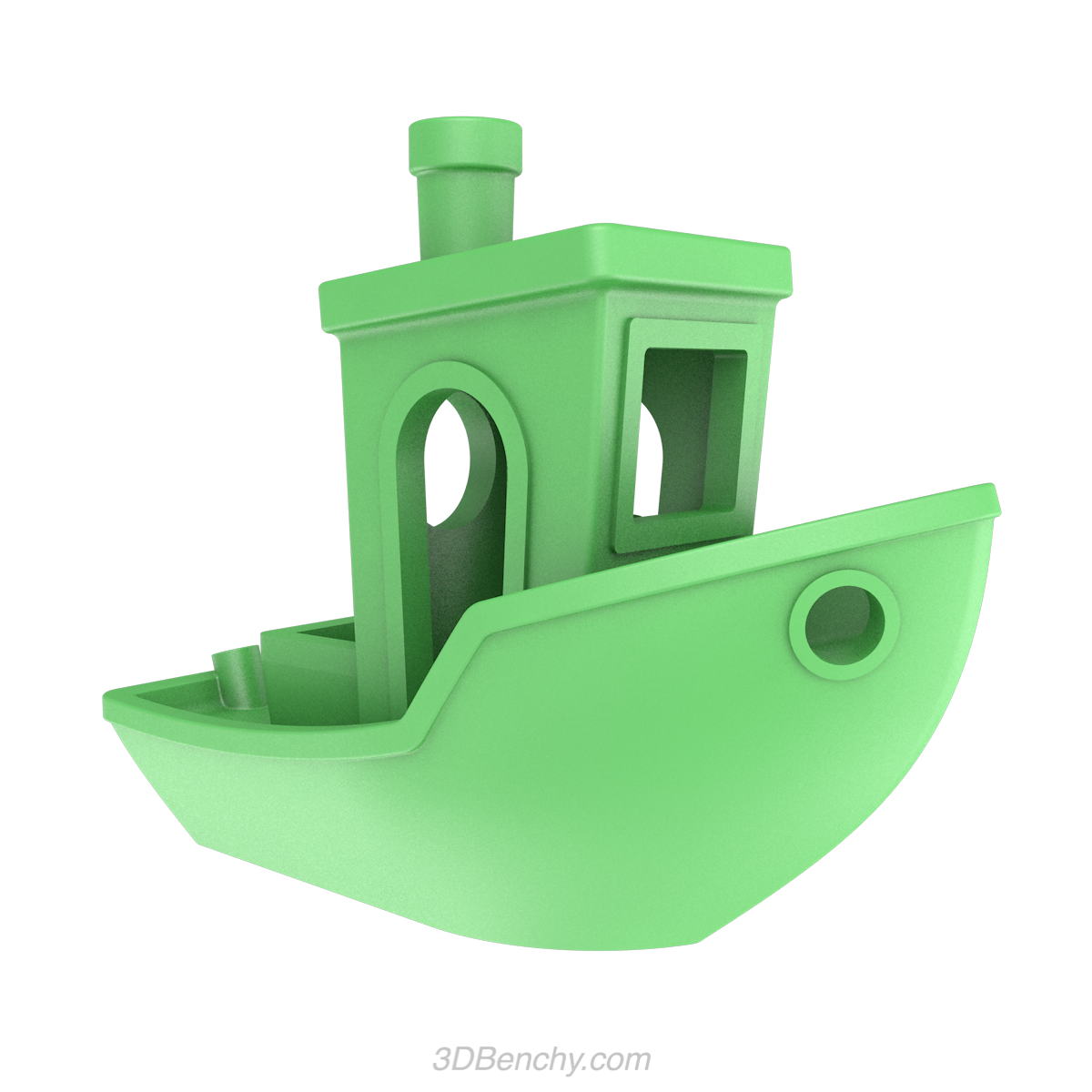
- The single-material 3DBenchy model

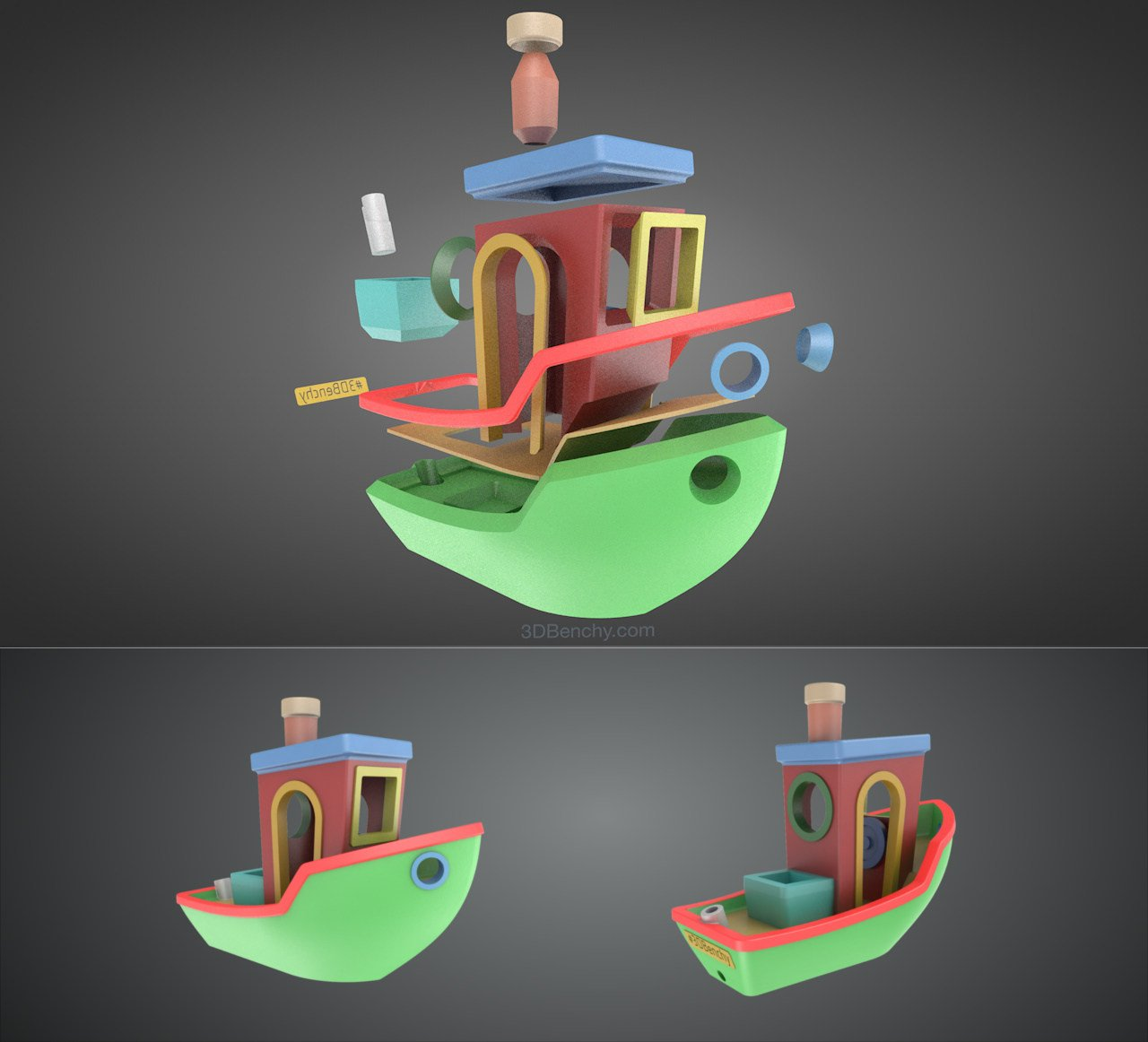
- The multi-material 3DBenchy model (exploded view illustration)
- Classification: 3D model
- Used with: 3D printers
- Inventor: Creative Tools

The 3DBenchy is a 3D computer model specifically designed for testing the accuracy and capabilities of 3D printers. Its creators, Daniel Norée and Paulo Kiefe, described it as "the jolly 3D printing torture-test". It was released in STL format in April 2015, with a multi-part, multi-color model released in July 2015.

Due to its status as a common benchmark, it is believed to be the world's most 3D printed object. The popular 3D printing website Thingiverse (where the model was originally uploaded) has the 3DBenchy marked as its most popular model of all time. The model itself is a tugboat design.

The original license of the model (CC-BY-ND) allowed its use and distribution, but prohibited modifications and the publication of derivative works; however, in February 2025, it was moved into the public domain (CC0 License).

This was due to Benchy remixes being removed from Printables due to a complaint, apparently claiming that their presence was incompatible with the original licensing terms, initially assumed to have been made by NTI (purchaser of the original designer Creative Tools), who subsequently denied it. This unfounded complaint caused NTI, Daniel Norée, and Paulo Kiefe to transition the 3DBenchy model into the public domain.

== Geometric feature assessment ==
3D model of 3DBenchy

3DBenchy's unique geometric features have made it the most comprehensive calibration print readily available to the public. These geometric features provide users with visual benchmarks to assess a large variety of 3D printing capabilities. Visual assessments can be made using the geometric characteristics listed below.

- Hull (Surface Deviations): It has a sizeable hull for its objectively small volume (15.55 cm^{3}). Its hull is a smooth, round, and overhanging surface that blatantly reveals any surface deviation issues.
- Bilateral Symmetry (Skewness and Warping): It is bilaterally symmetric. Printer skewness and warping are uncovered by variations in the ship's symmetry.
- Funnel top, main deck, and rear box (Parallelism): The keel is perfectly horizontal and planar. If printed correctly, the top of the funnel, main deck, and rear box behind the cabin are parallel to the bottom surface.
- Nameplate (Resolution): It features a small nameplate located in the center of the stern. The name “#3DBenchy” is engraved into the nameplate. This nameplate prints seamlessly if the resolution settings are configured correctly.
- Cabin Roof Bridge (Overhang): Overhang issues are often the pinnacle of a 3D printer’s weakness. The bridged roof and arched side doors of the cabin include complex and secluded geometry that distinctly reveal overhang issues.
- Acute Angled Surfaces (Layer Shifting): The bridged roof of the cabin and gunwale were designed to incorporate acute angles. These acute angles portray a 3D printer’s layer-stepping capability. Layer-shifting issues are present if the layer-stepping prints incorrectly.
- Shallow Bottom Characters (First Layer Issues): The characters “CT3D.xyz” are embedded in the keel. These characters are shallow and expose first-layer issues and squashing when present.

== Nominal dimensions ==
The nominal dimensions provide a measurable baseline to accurately assess variation. The dimensions can easily be measured with a caliper. The nominal dimensions, using a 1:1 scale, are listed below.

- Cabin Roof Bridge: The diagonal length of the cabin roof bridge is 23.00 mm.
- Funnel: The funnel, located atop the cabin roof, has an outer diameter of 7.00 mm. It features a hole that is 3.00 mm in diameter and 11.00 mm deep.
- Overall Length: From bow to stern, it measures 60.00 mm in length.
- Overall Width: From port to starboard, it measures 31.00 mm in width.
- Overall Heights: The height is commonly measured from the top of the funnel and the top of the box behind the cabin to the keel. From the top of the funnel, it measures 48.00 mm in height, and from the box, 15.50 mm.
- Rear Box: The rear box, located behind the cabin, has an exterior width of 12.00 mm and an exterior length of 10.81 mm. The interior of the box measures 8.00 mm in width, 7.00 mm in length, and 9.00 mm in depth.
- Hawsepipe:- The hawsepipe, located near the front of the hull, features an inner diameter of 4.00 mm and a minuscule flange thickness of 0.30 mm.
- Front Cabin Window: The rectangular front cabin window features an interior width of 10.50 mm and an interior height of 9.50 mm.
- Rear Cabin Window: The circular rear cabin window features an inner diameter of 9.00 mm and utilizes a minute flange that is 0.30 mm thick with an outer diameter of 12.00 mm.
- Bow Angle: It employs a high-cain spoon bow design with an overhang angle that measures 40° from the bottom surface.
- Cabin Roof Angle: The top surface of the cabin roof is designed at an acute angle of 5.5° from the horizontal plane.
- Nameplate Thickness: The nameplate, located in the center of the stern, utilizes a minuscule thickness of 0.10 mm.

== Gallery ==
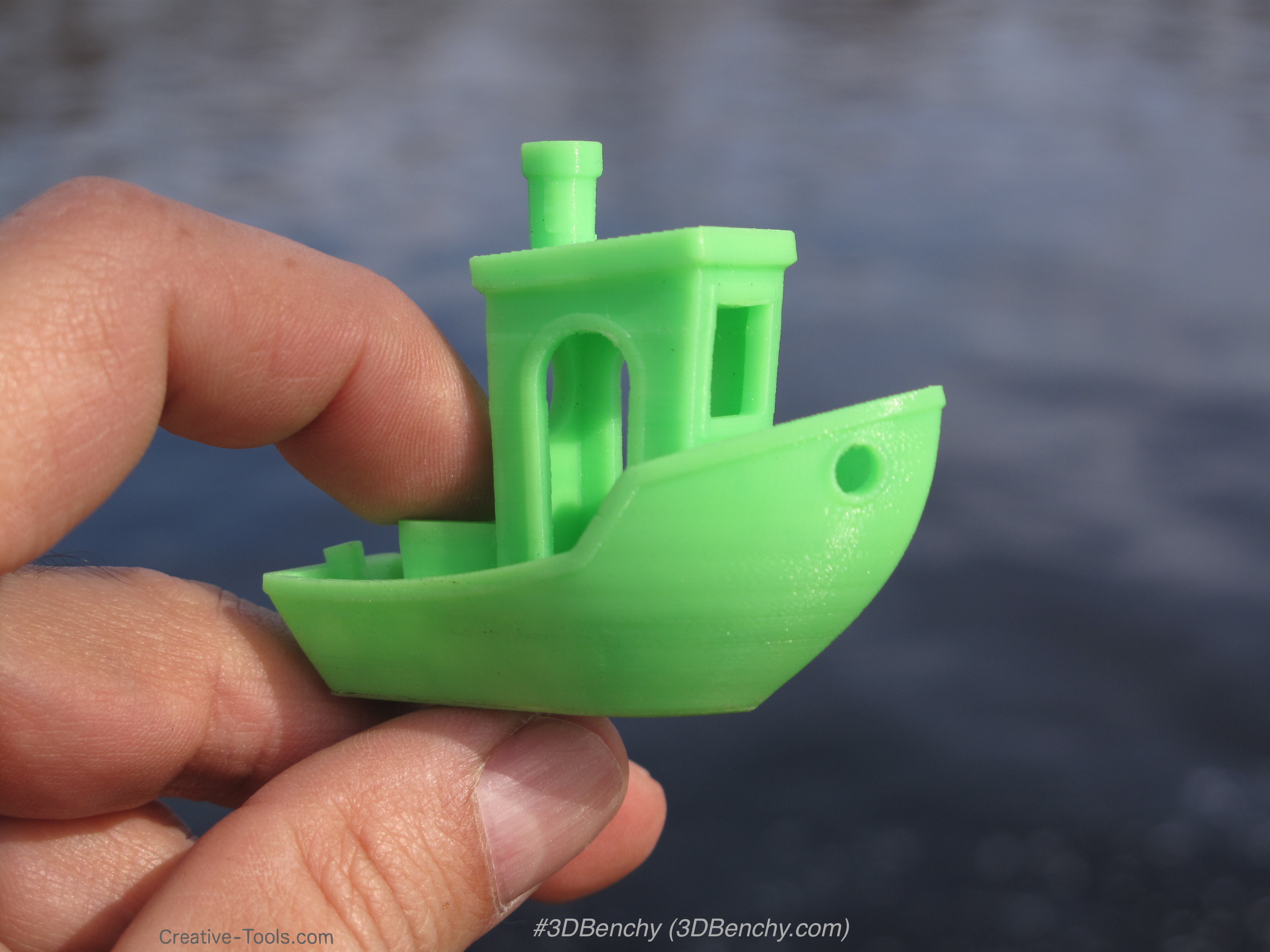
A 3DBenchy printed on a fused filament fabrication (FFF) 3D printer

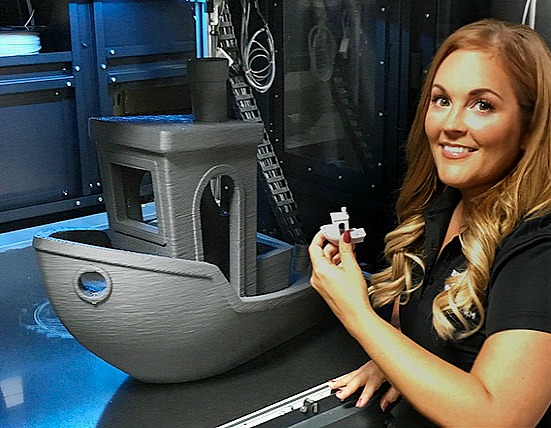
A 10x size (60 cm x 31 cm x 48 cm) 3DBenchy printed in PLA, made on a large-format FFF printer.

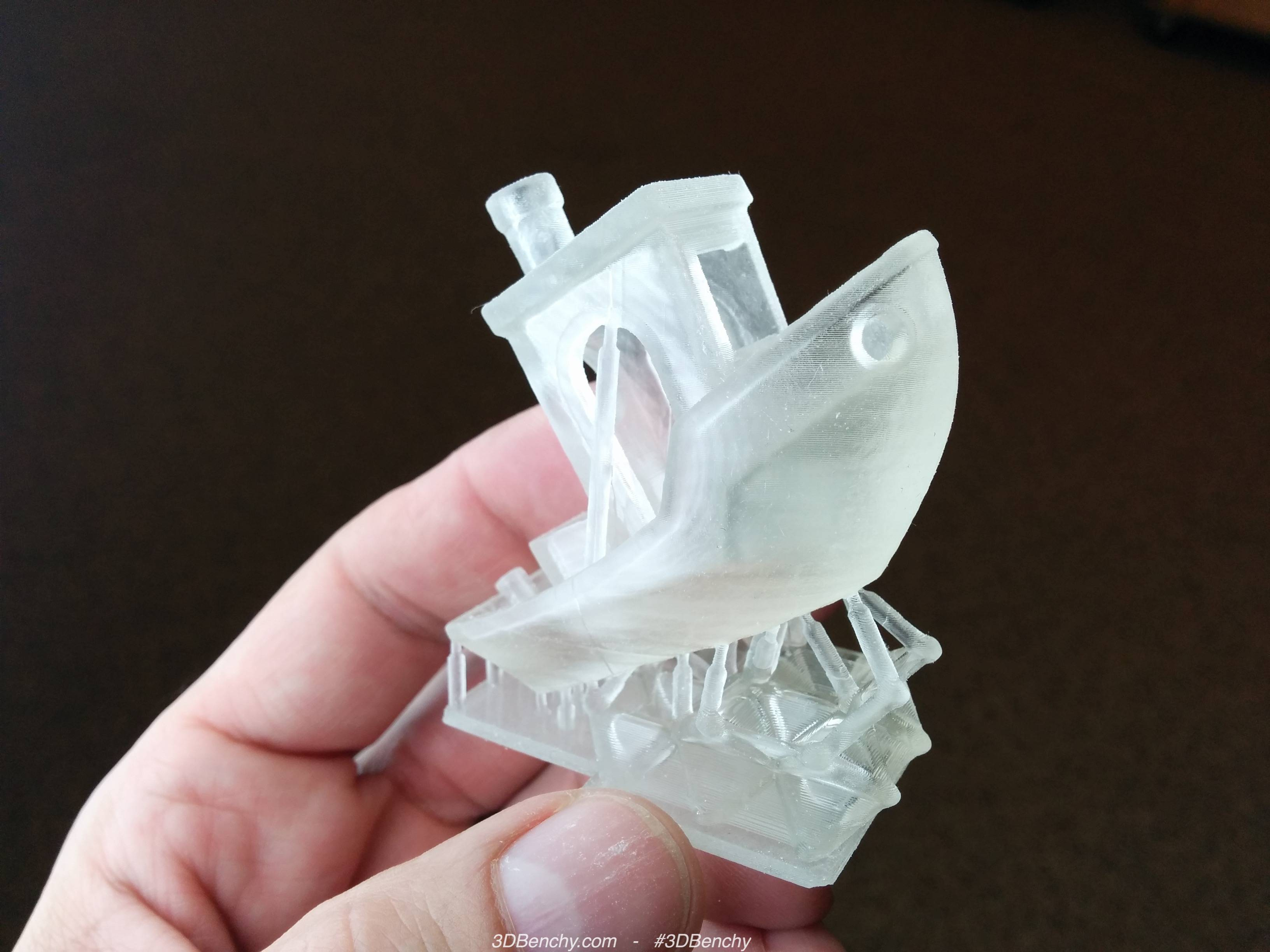
A 3DBenchy printed on a stereolithography (SLA) 3D printer with support material still attached

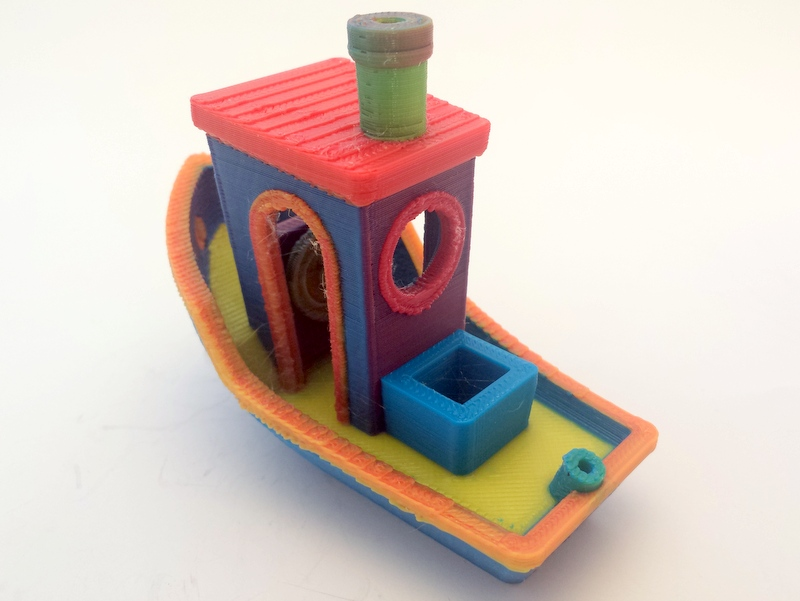
A multi-material 3DBenchy created on a Prusa i3 using a color-mixing hot end; each part of the boat has been created in a different colour.

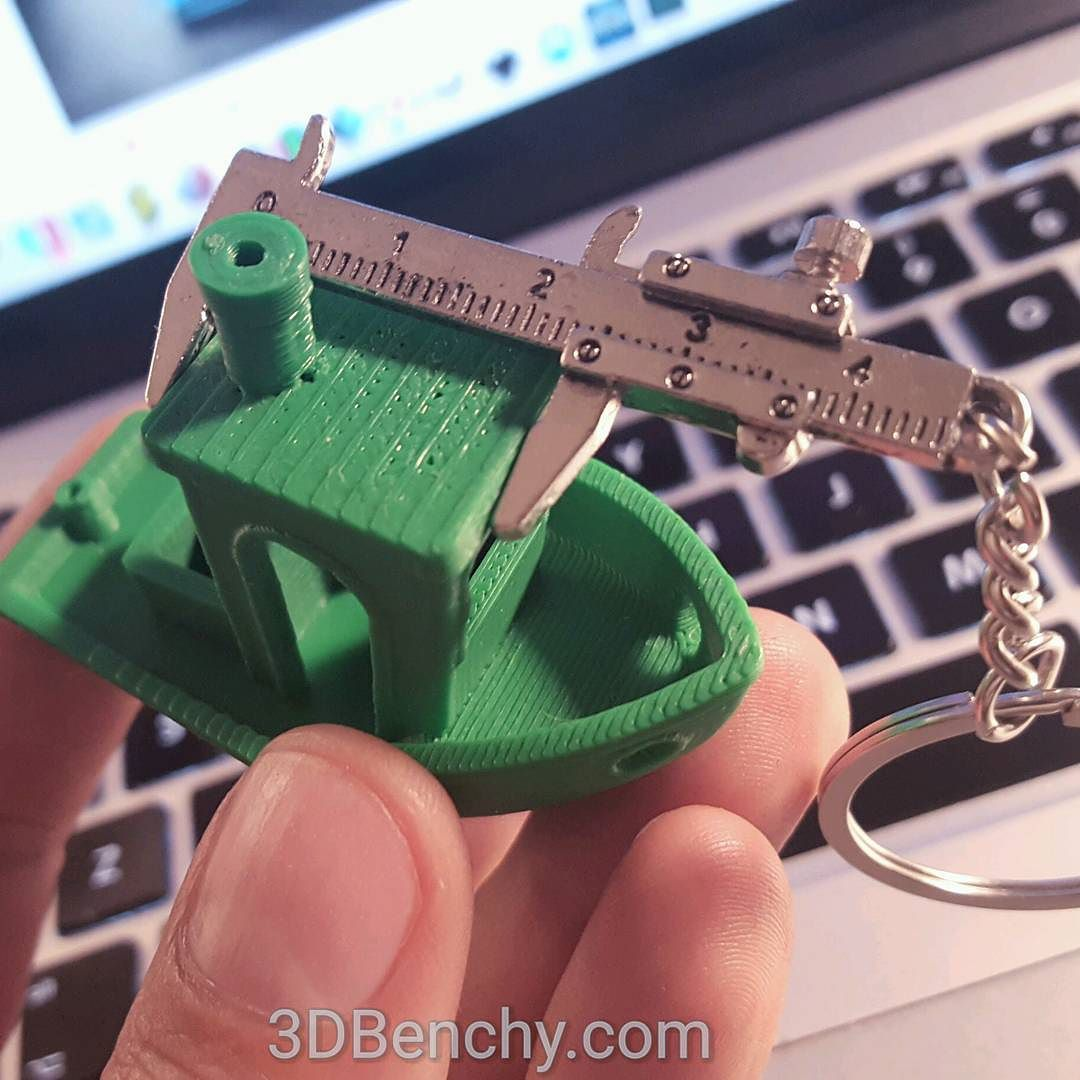
3DBenchy being measured with a caliper-like keyring

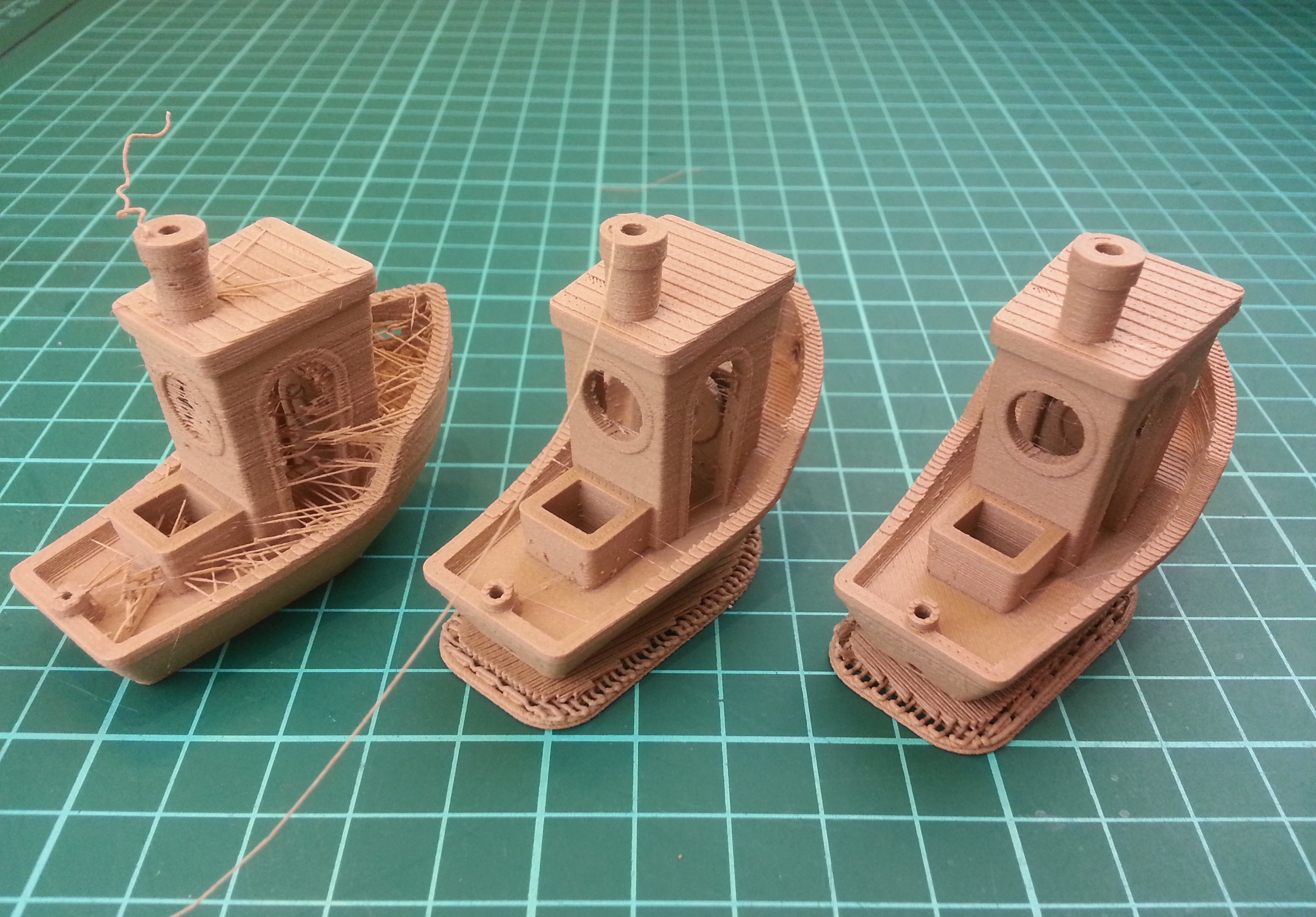
3DBenchys printed on a FFF 3D printer showing different faults caused by miscalibration

Two 3DBenchys being printed on a Hangprinter

== See also ==
- Standard test image
- Stanford bunny
- Utah teapot
- Suzanne (3D model)
- List of common 3D test models
