= RepRap Morgan =

Open source 3D printer

Reprap Morgan
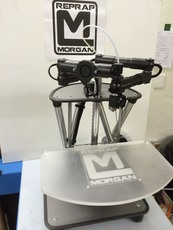
- RepRap Morgan Pro 2

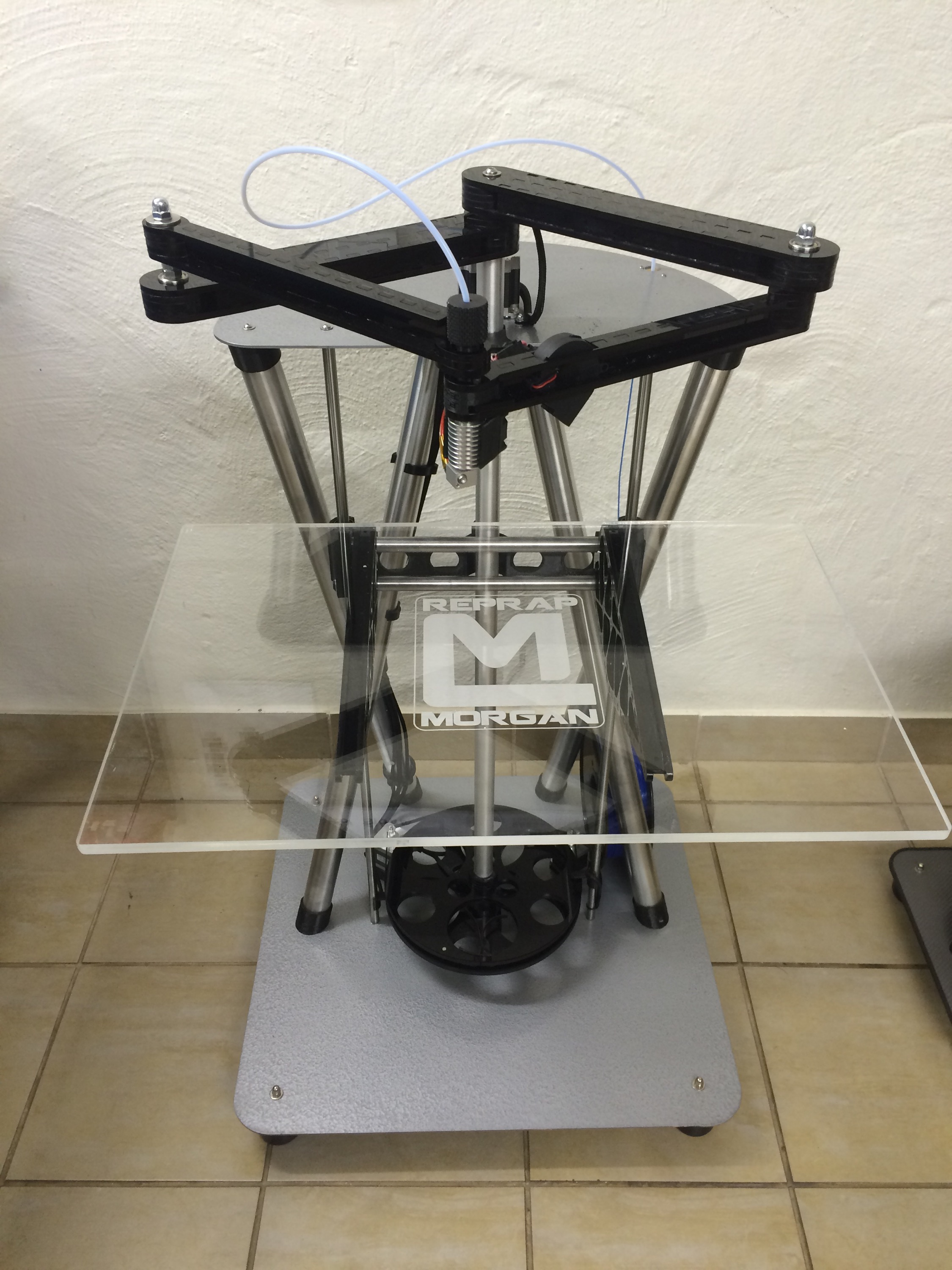
- RepRap Morgan Mega
- Classification: Fused deposition modeling 3D printer
- Inventor: Quentin Harley
- Manufacturer: Morgan 3D Printers

The RepRap Morgan is an open-source fused deposition modeling 3D printer. The Morgan is part of the RepRap project and has an unusual SCARA arm design. The first Morgan printer was designed by Quentin Harley, a South African engineer (working for Siemens at the time) at the House4Hack Makerspace in Centurion. The SCARA arm design was developed due to the lack of access to components of existing 3D printer designs in South Africa and their relatively high cost. In 2013 the Morgan won the HumanityPlus Uplift Personal Manufacturing Prize and third place in the Gauteng Accelerator Program.

The Morgan name comes from the RepRap convention of naming printers after famous deceased biologists. The Morgan printers was named after Thomas Hunt Morgan. He worked on the genome of the common fruitfly with his wife, Lilian Vaughan Morgan. Their names were used in the development codenames for the first two generations of Morgan 3D Printers.

Morgan printers are now manufactured full-time by the inventor in a small workshop factory in the House4Hack makerspace.

== Versions ==
There are four versions of the RepRap Morgan, the Morgan v1 (codenamed Thomas), Morgan Pro, Morgan Mega and Morgan Pro 2 (codenamed Lilian).

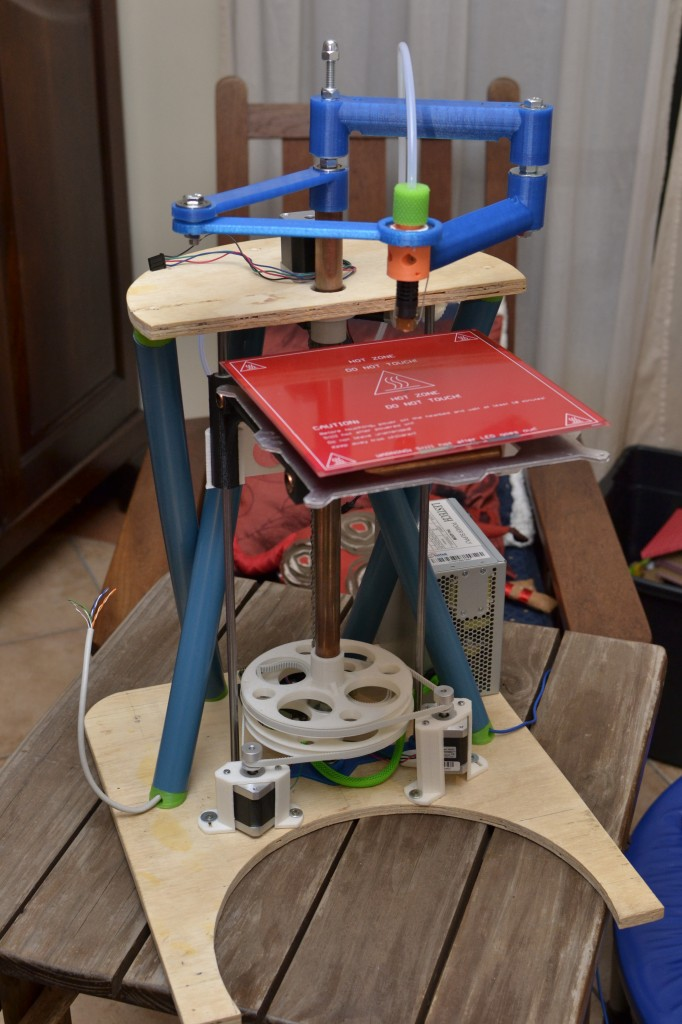
RepRap Morgan v1

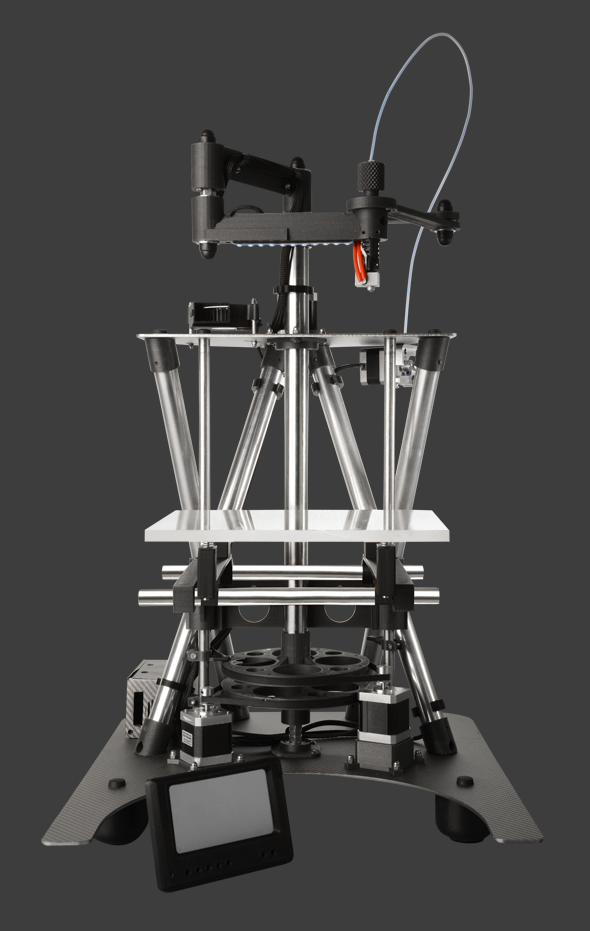
RepRap Morgan Pro

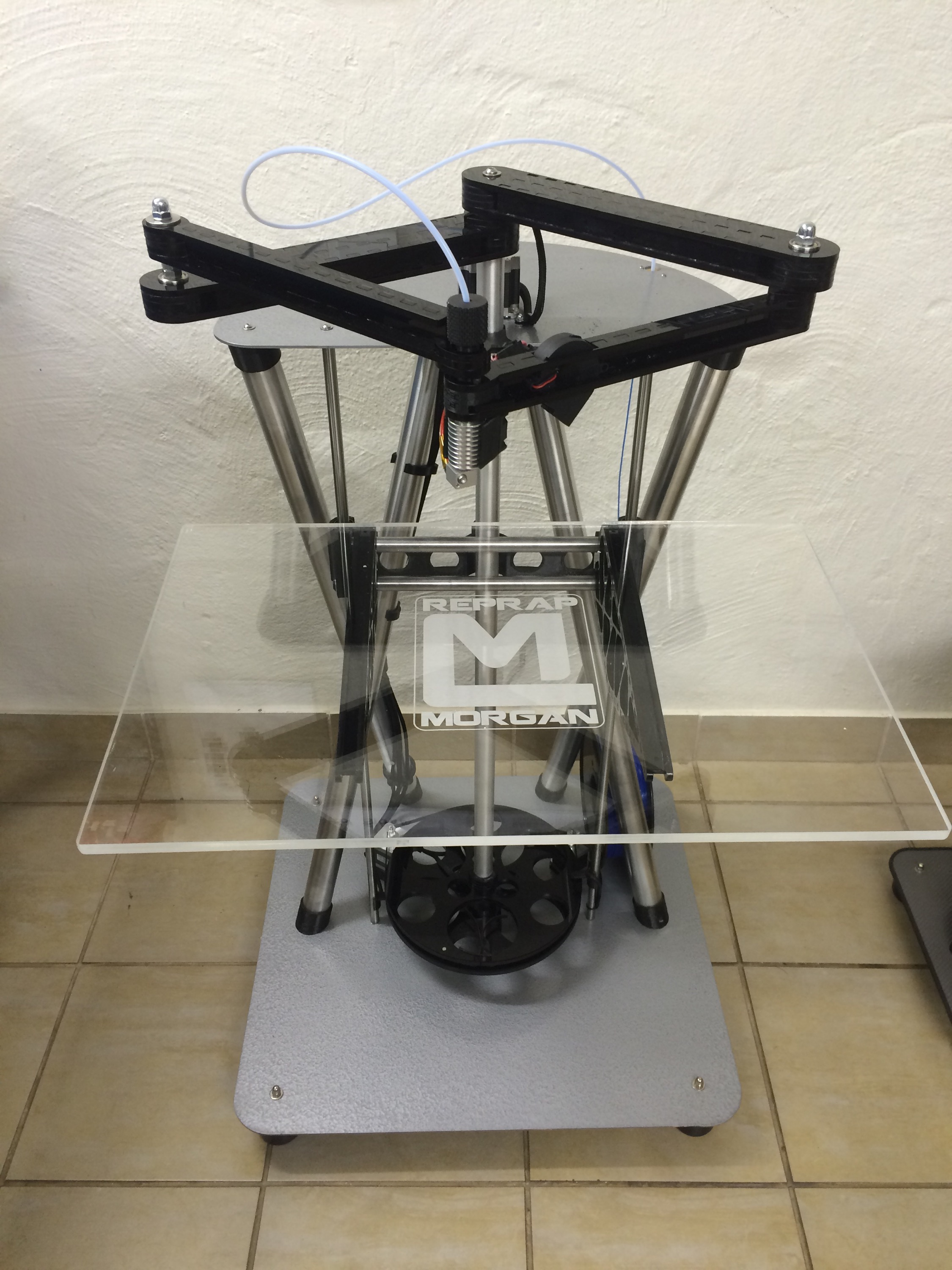
RepRap Morgan Mega

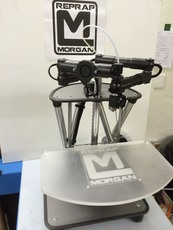
RepRap Morgan Pro 2
