= Bowyer (disambiguation) =

A bowyer is a person who makes bows.

Bowyer may also refer to:

== Places ==
- Bowyer Butte, Marie Byrd Land, Antarctica
- Bowyer Island, British Columbia, Canada
- Bowyer, an accepted name for Whitby, West Virginia, before 1919
- Fort Bowyer, Alabama, a US Army fortification twice fought over in the War of 1812

== Other uses ==
- Bowyer (surname), a list of people
- Bowyers (company), a defunct producer of meat products in the UK
- Bowyer Sparke (1759–1836), English bishop
- Bowyer baronets, five baronetcies created for members of the Bowyer family

== See also ==
- Boyer, a surname
