= RepRap Snappy =

Open source 3D printer

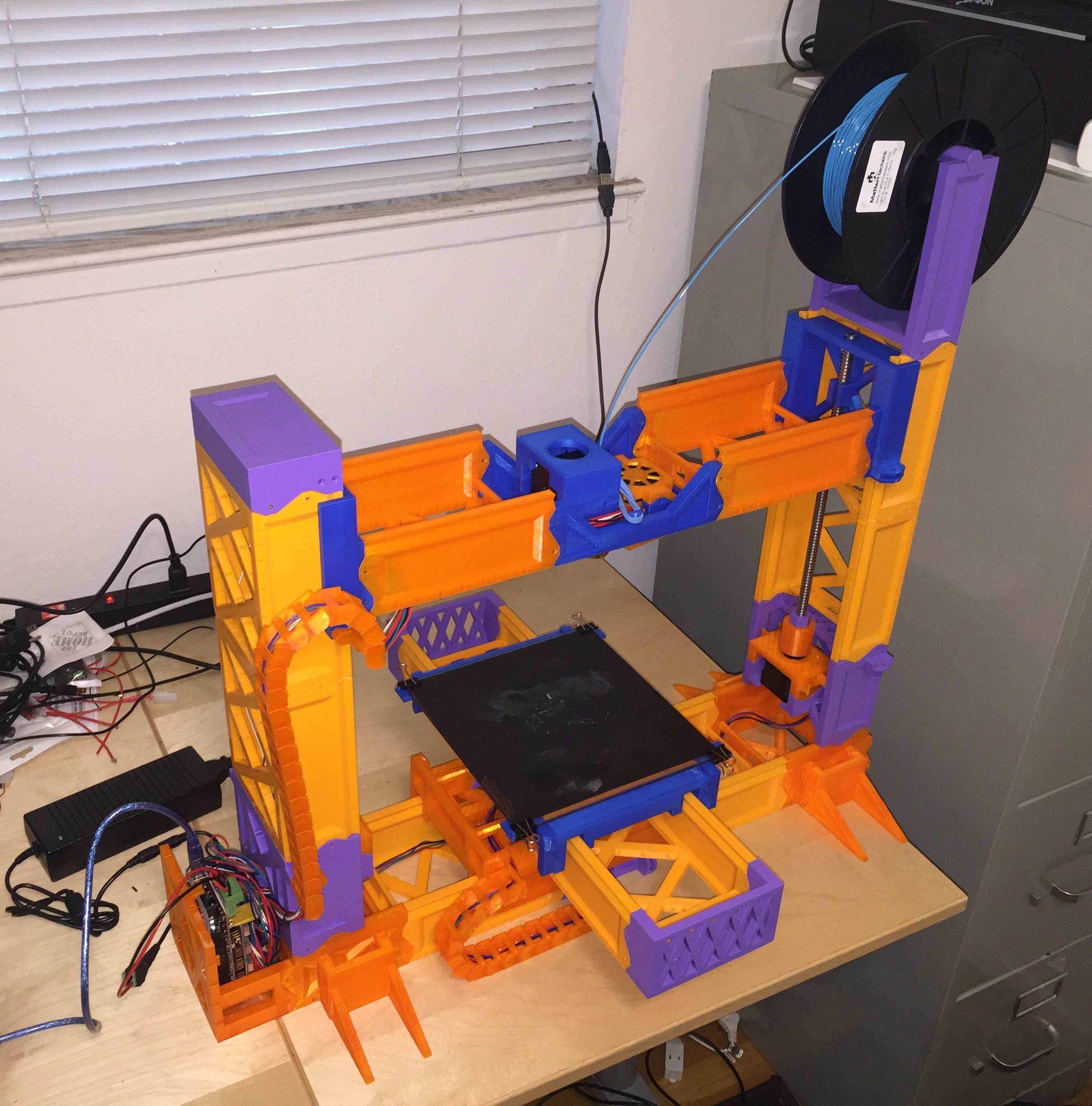
- RepRap Snappy 3D printer, Version 0.9

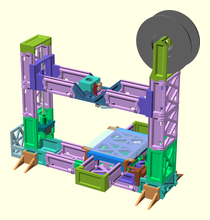
- RepRap Snappy 3D printer rendering, Version 1.1b
- Classification: Fused deposition modeling 3D printer
- Inventor: RevarBat

The RepRap Snappy is an open-source fused deposition modeling 3D printer, part of the RepRap project, it is the most self replicating 3D printer in the world.

The RepRap Snappy is designed to address the core goal of the RepRap project of creating a 'general-purpose self-replicating manufacturing machine'. The RepRap Snappy is able to create 73% of its own parts by volume with a design that eliminates as many of the non 3D printed parts as possible including belts and bearings which are replaced with a rack and pinion system. The name Snappy comes from the use of snap fit connectors used on the small printed parts to construct larger pieces, this both cuts down on the use of non 3D printed parts and means a smaller build volume is needed on the machine producing the parts. The only non self replicating parts on the printer are the motors, electronics, a glass build plate and one 686 bearing, the 3D printed parts take around 150 hours to create. The RepRap Snappy received an honourable mention in the Uplift Prize Grand Personal Manufacturing Prize.
