= Matthew Bowyer =

English cricketer (born 1973)

Personal information
- Full name: Matthew Bowyer
- Born: 25 July 1973 (age 53); Eastbourne, Sussex, England
- Batting: Right-handed

Domestic team information
- Years: Team
- 1996–2003: Buckinghamshire

Career statistics
Competition	List A
Matches	5
Runs scored	114
Batting average	22.80
100s/50s	–/–
Top score	43
Balls bowled	–
Wickets	–
Bowling average	–
5 wickets in innings	–
10 wickets in match	–
Best bowling	–
Catches/stumpings	2/–
- Source: Cricinfo, 3 May 2011

Matthew Bowyer (born 25 July 1973) is an English cricketer. Bowyer is a right-handed batsman. He was born in Eastbourne, Sussex.

Bowyer made his debut for Buckinghamshire in the 1996 Minor Counties Championship against Hertfordshire. Bowyer played Minor counties cricket for Buckinghamshire from 1996 to 2003, which included 12 Minor Counties Championship matches and 10 MCCA Knockout Trophy matches. In 1997, he made his List A debut against Essex in the NatWest Trophy. He played 4 further List A matches for Buckinghamshire, the last coming against Gloucestershire in the 2003 Cheltenham & Gloucester Trophy. In his 5 List A matches, he scored 114 runs at a batting average of 22.80, with a high score of 43.
