= Theresa Bowyer =

Former Women's Editor of Daily Times of Nigeria

- Citizenship: Nigeria
- Education: London School of Journalism
- Occupation: Journalist
- Employer: Daily Times of Nigeria

Theresa Bowyer was a former Women's Editor of the Daily Times of Nigeria.

She is a graduate of the London School of Journalism. Bowyer started work with Daily Times in 1951, after two years on the job, she became the first Women's Editor. In 1961, she attended the 8th U. S. National Commission for UNESCO Conference in Boston. After the end of the conference, she went on a State Department sponsored tour of select American cities.

Bowyer left the Times in 1963. She founded a school Therbow Primary and Secondary in Zaria where she lived with her husband.
