= Ursula Bowyer =

German-born British architect (1925–2025)

- Born: December 16, 1925
- Died: January 15, 2025 (aged 99)
- Occupation: Architect
- Notable work: Sports Pavilion, Festival of Britain (1951); The Growing Home (1961)
- Spouse: Gordon Bowyer
- Practice: Bowyer practice (with Gordon Bowyer)

Ursula Bowyer (née Meyer, 16 December 1925 – 15 January 2025) was a German-born British architect who played a prominent role in shaping modern domestic design in postwar Britain. Known particularly for her interiors and kitchens, she combined Bauhaus-influenced modernism with a strong sense of domestic function. She was also a key collector of modern British art.

== Early life ==
Born in Berlin in 1925 to a Jewish family, Ursula Meyer emigrated to Britain in 1938 as antisemitic legislation intensified under Nazi rule. She enrolled at the Regent Street Polytechnic in London, where she studied architecture and met Gordon Bowyer.

== Festival of Britain ==
In 1950 she married Gordon Bowyer. Together they worked on the Sports Pavilion for the Festival of Britain in 1951. Ursula contributed to the Pavilion's graphic and interior elements, reflecting the Bauhaus principles of colour and lightness.

== Architectural practice ==
Ursula played a central role in the Bowyer practice, often focusing on the design of domestic interiors. Historian Neil Bingham later described her kitchens as “fantastically chic and logical”, highlighting her reputation for functional elegance.

She also contributed to the mirrored terrace at 17 and 17A Montpellier Row in Blackheath, working on interior design for the home of future Prime Minister James Callaghan.

== The Growing Home ==
In 1961 Ursula co-created The Growing Home at the Earl's Court Furniture Show with the Design Research Unit. She was responsible for the domestic interiors that charted family life from childhood to old age. The project has been described as one of Britain's most original investigations into flexible living.

== Later work ==
After raising a family, Ursula returned to the practice as a partner in the 1960s. She contributed to private houses, housing schemes and boutique interiors, and collaborated with Gordon on cultural commissions including the British Museum galleries, Science Museum and the National Gallery.

== Collecting ==
Ursula helped shape the Bowyers’ art collection, drawing on her connections to networks of artists and designers. The collection included works by Ben Nicholson, Paul Nash, Victor Pasmore, Keith Vaughan, Reg Butler and Robert MacBryde. Their Georgian home at Maze Hill in Greenwich also featured designs by Robin Day, Finn Juhl, Alvar Aalto and Tapio Wirkaala.

== Legacy ==
Ursula Bowyer is remembered as a pioneering woman architect in a male-dominated profession, and as part of a network of collectors who sustained avant-garde British art in the mid twentieth century.

In 2010, Ursula was awarded an honorary doctorate of design by the University of Greenwich – recognition both of her role as a campaigner for the preservation and improvement of the Maritime Greenwich World Heritage Site, and her significance as a modernist architect.
