= RepRap =

Self-replicating 3D printer initiative

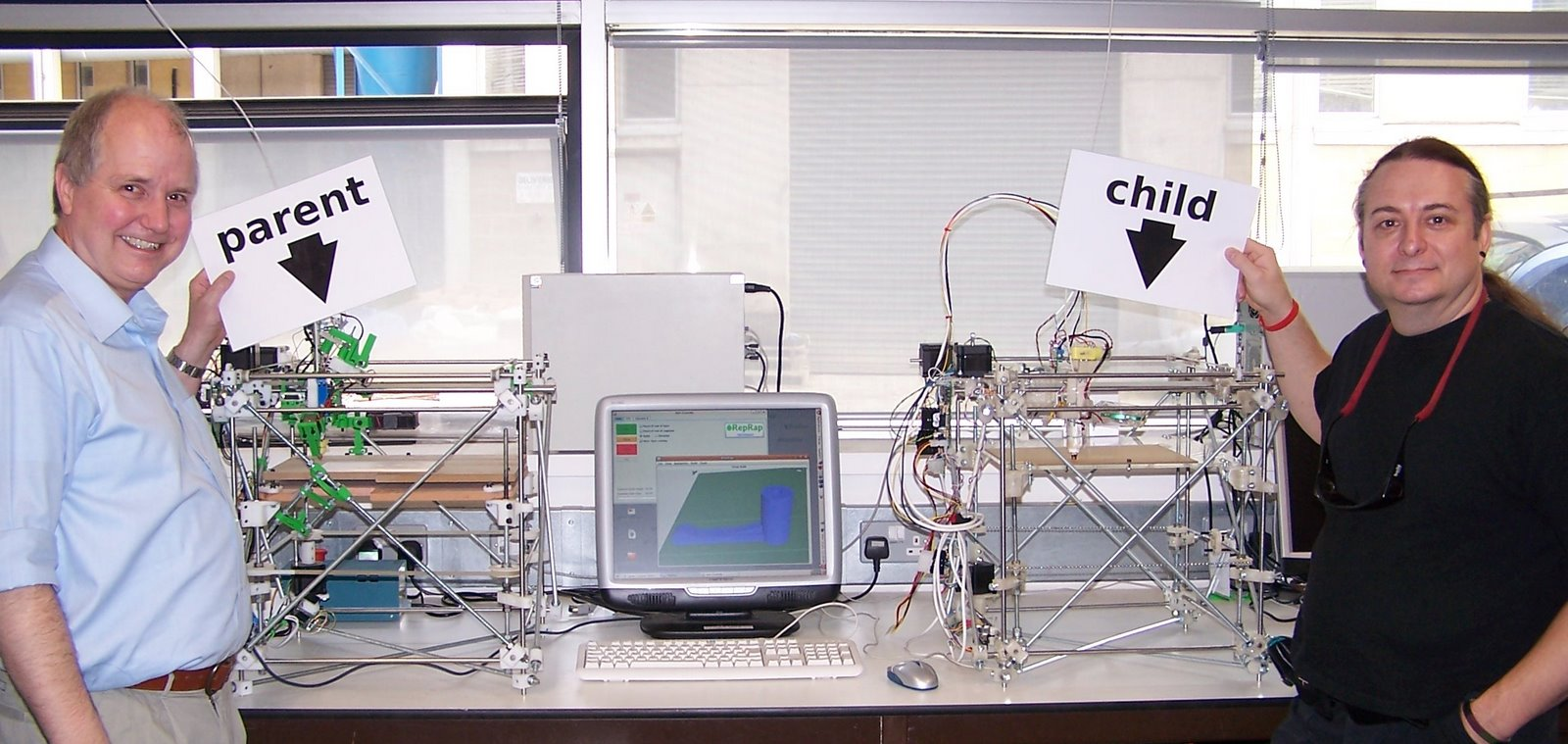
All of the plastic parts for the machine on the right were produced by the machine on the left. Adrian Bowyer (left) and Vik Olliver (right) are members of the RepRap project.

RepRap (a contraction of replicating rapid prototyper) is a project to develop low-cost 3D printers that can print most of their own components. As open designs, all of the designs produced by the project are released under a free software license, the GNU General Public License.

Due to the ability of these machines to make some of their own parts, authors envisioned the possibility of cheap RepRap units, enabling the manufacture of complex products without the need for extensive industrial infrastructure. They intended for the RepRap to demonstrate evolution in this process as well as for it to increase in number exponentially. A preliminary study claimed that using RepRaps to print common products results in economic savings.

The RepRap project started in England in 2005 as a University of Bath initiative, but it is now made up of hundreds of collaborators worldwide.

== History ==
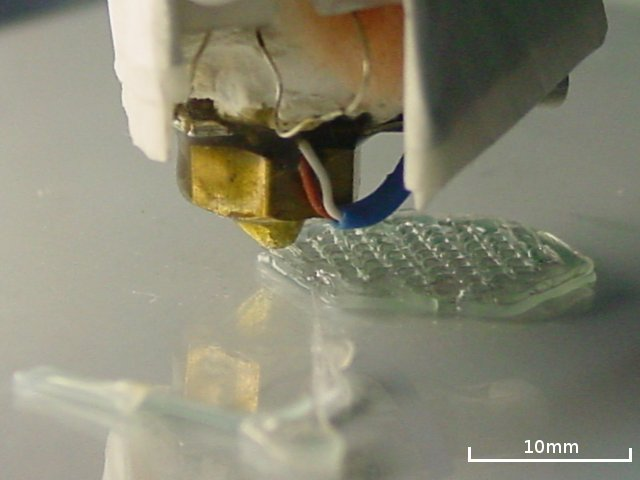
RepRap 0.1 building an object

The first RepRap machine on display at the London Science Museum in 2023

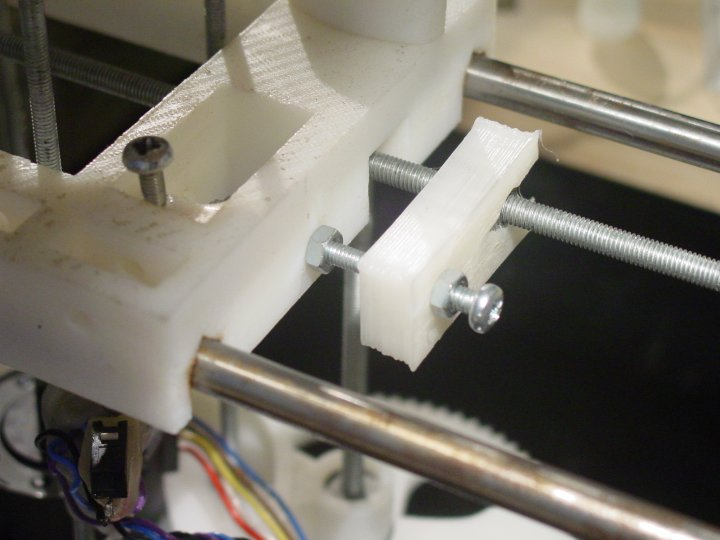
First part ever made by a RepRap to make a RepRap, fabricated by the Zaphod prototype, by Vik Olliver (2007-09-13)

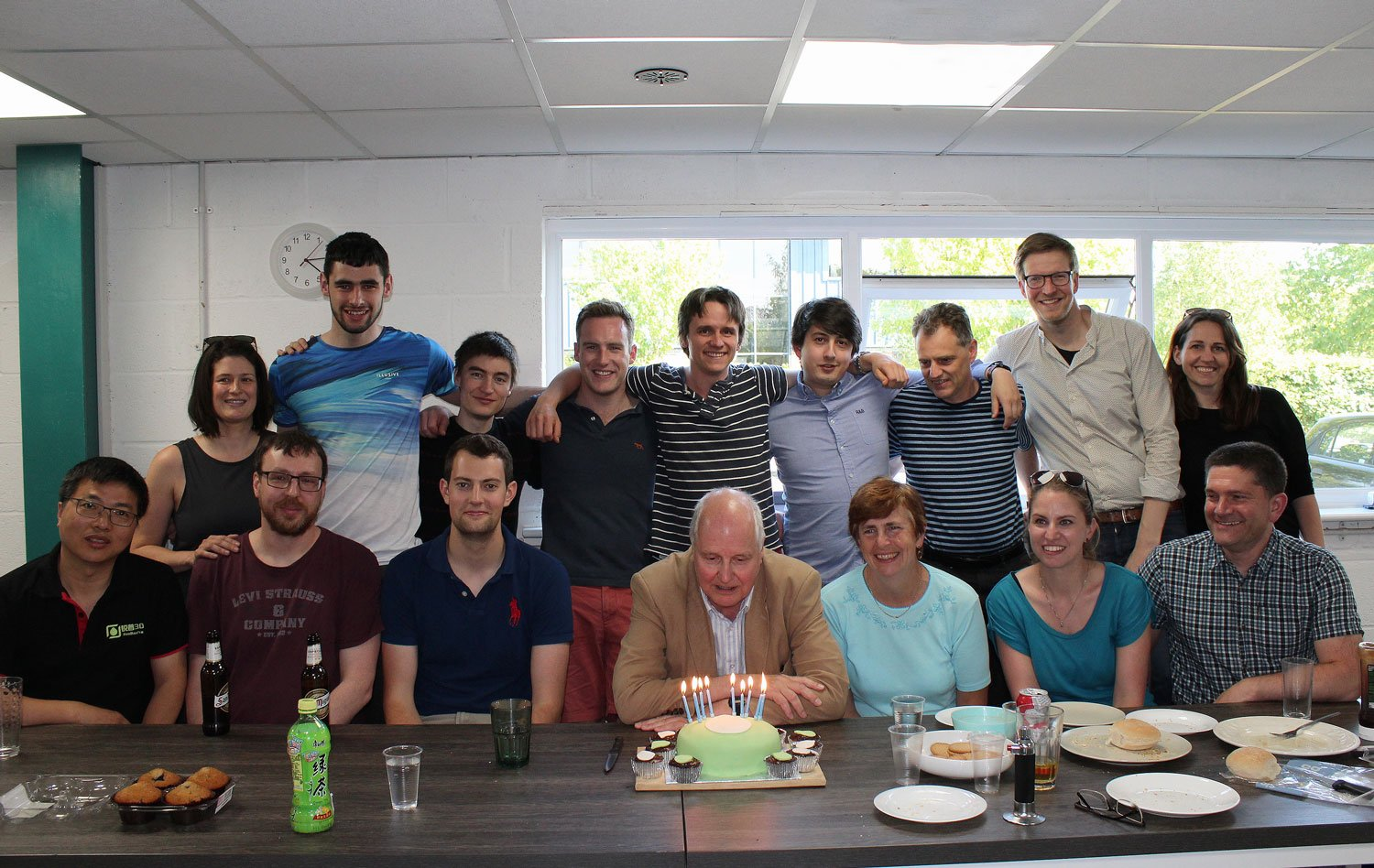
A RepRap 10th Birthday celebration

RepRap was founded in 2005 by Adrian Bowyer, a Senior Lecturer in mechanical engineering at the University of Bath in England. Funding was obtained from the Engineering and Physical Sciences Research Council.

On 13 September 2006, the RepRap 0.2 prototype printed the first part identical to its own, which was then substituted for the original part created by a commercial 3D printer. On 9 February 2008, RepRap 1.0 "Darwin" made at least one instance of over half its rapid-prototyped parts. On 14 April 2008, RepRap made an end-user item: a clamp to hold an iPod to the dashboard of a Ford Fiesta car. By September that year, at least 100 copies had been produced in various countries. On 29 May 2008, Darwin achieved self replication by making a complete copy of all its rapid-prototyped parts (which represent 48% of all the parts, excluding fasteners). A couple hours later the "child" machine had made its first part: a timing-belt tensioner.

In April 2009, electronic circuit boards were produced automatically with a RepRap, using an automated control system and a swappable head system capable of printing both plastic and conductive solder. On 2 October 2009, the second generation design, called Mendel, printed its first part. Mendel's shape resembles a triangular prism rather than a cube. Mendel was completed in October 2009. On 27 January 2010, the Foresight Institute announced the "Kartik M. Gada Humanitarian Innovation Prize" for the design and construction of an improved RepRap.

On 31 August 2010, the third generation design was named Huxley. It was a miniature of Mendel, with 30% of the original print volume. Within two years, RepRap and RepStrap building and use were widespread in the technology, gadget and engineering communities.

In 2012, the first successful Delta design, Rostock, had a radically different design. The latest iterations used OpenBeams, wires (typically Dyneema or Spectra fishing lines) instead of belts, and so forth, which also represented some of the latest trends in RepRaps.

In early January 2016, RepRapPro (short for "RepRap Professional", and one commercial arm of the RepRap project in the UK) announced that it would cease trading on 15 January 2016. The reason given was congestion of the market for low-cost 3D printers and the inability to expand in that market. RepRapPro China continues to operate.

== Hardware ==
As the project was designed by Bowyer to encourage evolution, many variations have been created. As an open source project, designers are free to make modifications and substitutions, but they must allow any of their potential improvements to be reused by others.

There are many RepRap printer designs including:

- Prusa i3
- Hangprinter
- RepRap Fisher
- RepRap Snappy
- RepRap Morgan
- RepRap Ormerod
- RepRap Darwin
- RepRap Mendel

== Software ==
Adrian Bowyer talking about the RepRap Project at Poptech 2007

RepRap was conceived as a complete replication system rather than simply a piece of hardware. To this end the system includes computer-aided design (CAD) in the form of a 3D modeling system and computer-aided manufacturing (CAM) software and drivers that convert RepRap users' designs into a set of instructions to the RepRap to create physical objects.

Initially, two CAM tool chains were developed for RepRap. The first, called "RepRap Host", was written in Java by lead RepRap developer Adrian Bowyer. The second, "Skeinforge", was written by Enrique Perez. Both are complete systems for translating 3D computer models into G-code, the machine language that commands the printer.

Later, other programs like Slic3r and Cura were created. Recently, the Franklin firmware was created to allow RepRap printers to be used for other purposes such as milling and fluid handling.

Free and open-source 3-D modeling programs like Blender, OpenSCAD, and FreeCAD are preferred in the RepRap community, but almost any CAD or 3D modeling program can be used with the RepRap, as long as it can produce STL files (Slic3r also supports .obj and .amf files). Thus, content creators make use of any tools they are familiar with, whether they are commercial CAD programs, such as SolidWorks and Autodesk AutoCAD, Autodesk Inventor, Tinkercad, or SketchUp along with the libre software.

== Replication materials ==
A timelapse video of a robot model (logo of Make magazine) being printed using FFF on a RepRap Fisher, a delta-style printer.

RepRaps print objects from ABS, Polylactic acid (PLA), Nylon (possibly not all extruders can), HDPE, TPE and similar thermoplastics.

The mechanical properties of RepRap-printed PLA and ABS have been tested and are equivalent to the tensile strengths of parts made by proprietary printers.

Unlike with most commercial machines, RepRap users are encouraged to experiment with materials and methods, and to publish their results. Methods for printing novel materials (such as ceramics) have been developed this way. In addition, several RecycleBots have been designed and fabricated to convert waste plastic, such as shampoo containers and milk jugs, into inexpensive RepRap filament. There is some evidence that using this approach of distributed recycling is better for the environment and can be useful for creating "fair trade filament".

In addition, 3D printing products at the point of consumption has also been shown to be better for the environment.

The RepRap project has identified polyvinyl alcohol (PVA) as a potentially suitable support material to complement its printing process, although massive overhangs can be made by extruding thin layers of the primary printing media as support (these are mechanically removed afterwards).

Printing electronics is a major goal of the RepRap project so that it can print its own circuit boards. Several methods have been proposed:

- Wood's metal or Field's metal: low-melting point metal alloys to incorporate electrical circuits into the part as it is being formed.
- Silver/carbon-filled polymers: commonly used to repair circuit boards and are being considered for use for electrically conductive traces.
- Direct extrusion of solder
- Conductive wires: can be laid into a part from a spool during the printing process

Using a MIG welder as a print head a RepRap deltabot stage can be used to print metals like steel.

The RepRap concept can also be applied to a milling machine and to laser welding.

== Construction ==
Although the aim of the project is for RepRap to be able to autonomously construct many of its own mechanical components soon using fairly low-level resources, several components such as sensors, stepper motors and microcontrollers cannot yet be made using the RepRap's 3D printing technology and so have to be produced independently. The plan is to approach 100% replication over a series of versions. For example, from the onset of the project, the RepRap team has explored a variety of approaches to integrating electrically-conductive media into the product. This would allow inclusion of connective wiring, printed circuit boards, and possibly motors in RepRapped products. Variations in the nature of the extruded, electrically-conductive media could produce electrical components with different functions from pure conductive traces, similar to the 1940s sprayed-circuit process Electronic Circuit Making Equipment (ECME), by John Sargrove. A related approach is printed electronics. Another non-replicable component is the threaded rods for linear motions. A current research area is in using replicated Sarrus linkages to replace them.

== Project members ==
The "Core team" of the project has included:

- Adrian Bowyer, former Senior Lecturer, Mechanical Engineering Department, University of Bath
- Ed Sells, University of Bath PhD "3D Printing: Towards a Self-Replicating Rapid Prototyping Machine"
- Vik Olliver, the first RepRap volunteer, the first to suggest using PLA as a printing material
- Michael S. Hart (deceased 2011), creator of Project Gutenberg, Illinois

== Goals ==
Video of RepRap printing an object

The stated goal of the RepRap project is to produce a pure self-replicating device not for its own sake, but rather to put in the hands of individuals anywhere on the planet, for a minimal outlay of capital, a desktop manufacturing system that would enable the individual to manufacture many of the artifacts used in everyday life. From a theoretical viewpoint, the project aims to prove the hypothesis that "rapid prototyping and direct writing technologies are sufficiently versatile to allow them to be used to make a von Neumann universal constructor".

== Education ==
RepRap technology has great potential in educational applications, according to some scholars. RepRaps have already been used for an educational mobile robotics platform. Some authors have claimed that RepRaps offer an unprecedented "revolution" in STEM education. The evidence comes from both the low cost of rapid prototyping by students, and the fabrication of low-cost high-quality scientific equipment from open hardware designs forming open-source labs.

== See also ==
- 3D printing processes
- Disruptive technology
- Fab lab
- Fab@Home
- Open-source hardware (OSH, OSHW)
- Recyclebot
- Self-replicating machine
- Voron 2.4 (2020), a CoreXY printer described as a resurgence of the RepRap project
