= Gordon Arthur Bowyer =

British Architect

Gordon Bowyer
- Born: March 21, 1923
- Died: October 11, 2019 (aged 96)
- Occupation: Architect
- Notable work: Sports Pavilion, Festival of Britain (1951); 17–17A Montpellier Row (1958); British Museum galleries
- Spouse: Ursula Meyer
- Practice: Bowyer practice (with Ursula Bowyer)

Gordon Arthur Bowyer (21 March 1923 – 11 October 2019) was a British architect known for his role in postwar modernism. Active for more than four decades, he helped design numerous projects ranging from private houses to commercial interiors and public galleries. He is also remembered as a significant collector of modern British art.

== Early life and education ==
Bowyer studied at the Regent Street Polytechnic (now the University of Westminster) during the Second World War, where he trained under the émigré architect Peter Moro among others. It was here that he met fellow student Ursula Meyer, a German-Jewish refugee who later became his wife and professional partner.

== Festival of Britain ==
In 1950 Gordon married Ursula while the pair were working on the Sports Pavilion for the Festival of Britain (1951). Gordon was recognised for his technical and structural coordination of the Pavilion, which embodied the Festival’s emphasis on renewal and innovation.

== Architectural practice ==
Following the Festival, Gordon and Ursula established their practice in Blandford Street, Marylebone. Gordon played a leading role in steering the studio and collaborating with contemporaries such as Trevor Dannatt, Alan Irvine, Ronald Cuddon, Kenneth Grange, Walter Grieves, and Richard and Margaret Finch.

Notable commissions included 17 and 17A Montpellier Row in Blackheath (1958), designed for Labour politician James Callaghan.

== Later work ==
From the 1960s Gordon expanded the practice to larger commercial and cultural projects. He oversaw a series of boutiques for Vidal Sassoon in Europe and the United States. He was principal architect for gallery spaces at the British Museum, including the Japanese Gallery, the Oriental Antiquities Gallery and the Prints and Drawings Gallery.

The practice also designed the East Hall refurbishment for the Science Museum in 1988, as well as projects for the Cabinet War Rooms and the National Gallery.

In 1970 Gordon designed a section of Expo '70 in Osaka, Japan. He was subsequently awarded the OBE for this work.

== Collecting ==
Gordon’s lifelong passion for art collecting began when he used money intended for a 21st-birthday bicycle to purchase a work by Ben Nicholson. Over time he and Ursula built a collection that included works by Paul Nash, Eric Ravilious, Victor Pasmore, Keith Vaughan, Robert Adams and Reg Butler.

== Legacy ==
By his retirement in 1993, Gordon Bowyer was recognised as a contributor to British postwar architecture. His practice combined modernist principles with a pragmatic, human-scaled approach.
