= Chaz Bowyer =

British Royal Air Force armaments and explosives instructor (1926–2008)

Chaz Bowyer

Raymond "Chaz" Bowyer (29 September 1926 – 18 June 2008) was a Royal Air Force armaments and explosives instructor who, after he retired from service, wrote and edited over forty books relating to the operations, aircraft, and men of the Royal Flying Corps, Royal Air Force, and Royal Naval Air Service. He also edited for publication the memoirs of the pilots C.P.O. Bartlett, Eric Crundall, and Gwilym H. Lewis.

== Early life and family ==
Chaz Bowyer was born in Weymouth, Dorset, on 29 September 1926, to Reginald (a builder) and Dorothy Bowyer née Northam. He was educated at high schools in Solihull and Nelson, England. He married twice and had a daughter from his first marriage and a son and a daughter from his second. His first wife pre-deceased him. A heavy smoker, Bowyer gave up cigarettes for small cigars after a heart attack.

== Royal Air Force ==
Bowyer joined the Royal Air Force in 1943 at the age of 16 under the Aircraft Apprentice Scheme, based at RAF Halton. The scheme had been instituted by Lord Trenchard to improve the supply of technically trained ground crew and its entrants were affectionately known as "Trenchard brats". He served for 26 years, became an instructor in explosives and armaments, and was stationed in Egypt, Libya, Palestine, Singapore, and Aden. On his first posting overseas, somewhere in north Africa, he was told to dig a hole in the sand and improvise a tent over it. He often remarked, "If you can't take a joke you shouldn't have joined". He reached the rank of sergeant before retiring in 1969 to pursue a career in aviation research and writing. He was a life member of the Royal Air Force Association.

== Writing ==
Bowyer produced over forty books relating to the Royal Flying Corps, Royal Air Force and the Royal Naval Air Service. He told Contemporary Authors:

My motivation? Primarily to place on permanent record accurate accounts of men, deeds, and events connected with Royal Air Force history. This is exemplified (perhaps) by For Valour: The Air V.C.s which is now accepted as the standard reference work on the subject. I am tired of reading historical drivel as perpetrated by 'well-known' authors, most of whom are simply novelists or journalists with no background knowledge of genuine aviation history. Too many 'military historians' are simply writers jumping on the history bandwagon only for profit.

He began to write while in service with the RAF, contributing to squadron newsletters and similar publications wherever he was stationed. His first book attempt was on RAF Calshot but his first major work was The Flying Elephants, a history of Number 27 Squadron, Royal Flying Corps and the Royal Air Force from 1915 to 1969 (Macdonald, 1972), a unit in which Bowyer served, which received a foreword by Air Marshal Sir Andrew McKee.

In 1979 he edited a translation from German into English of Armand van Ishoven's life of the First World War flying ace Ernst Udet, Udet (1977), published in English as The Fall of an Eagle: The Life of Fighter Ace Ernst Udet.

He wrote nine titles for Ian Allan's At War series describing the operational career of various British Second World War aircraft. For a time he was the editor of the journal of the Cross and Cockade International society devoted to the history of aviation during the First World War. His books were researched through his personal library, clippings, photographs, and especially personal contacts. He rarely consulted the Ministry of Defence or the Public Record Office, though he had good contacts with the Imperial War Museum.

== Death and legacy ==
Bowyer died on 18 June 2008 at the Norfolk and Norwich Hospital after a short illness. He was cremated at St Faith's Crematorium, Norwich, on 2 July and his ashes scattered at RAF Halton. He received an obituary in the Cross and Cockade International.

== Selected publications ==
=== 1970s ===
- The Flying Elephants: A History of No.27 Squadron, Royal Flying Corps-Royal Air Force, 1915–69. Macdonald and Co., London, 1972. ISBN 0356038165
- Adventures in the Air. Macmillan, London, 1973. (Juvenile, 4 parts)
- Airmen of World War I: Men of the British and Empire Air Forces in Old Photographs. Arms & Armour Press, London, 1975. ISBN 0882543563
- Hampden Special. Ian Allan, London, 1976. ISBN 0711006830
- History of the RAF. Hamlyn, London, 1977. ISBN 0600375889
- Sopwith Camel: King of Combat. Glasney Press, 1978. ISBN 095028257X
- Guns in the Sky: The Air Gunners Of World War Two. Dent, London, 1979. ISBN 046004429X

=== 1980s ===
- Supermarine Spitfire. Arms and Armour/Bison, 1980. ISBN 0890093210
- Air War Over Europe: 1939–1945. William Kimber, London, 1981. ISBN 0718302389
- The Age of the Biplane. Hamlyn/Bison, London, 1981. ISBN 0600349454
- Fighter Command 1936–1968. Dent, London, 1981. ISBN 0460043889
- Surviving World War II Aircraft. Batsford, London, 1981. ISBN 0713434317
- The Encyclopedia of British Military Aircraft. Arms and Armour Press, London, 1982. ISBN 0853685177
- Images of Air War, 1939–45. Batsford, London, 1983. 0713437847
- Bristol Blenheim. Ian Allan, 1984. ISBN 0711013519
- Mosquito Squadrons of the Royal Air Force. Ian Allan, 1984. ISBN 0711014256
- Bristol F2B Fighter: King of Two-Seaters. Ian Allan, 1985.
- Gloster Meteor. Ian Allan, 1985. (Postwar Military Aircraft: 2) ISBN 0711014779
- Tales from the Bombers. William Kimber, London, 1985. ISBN 0718305663
- The Wellington Bomber. William Kimber, London, 1986. ISBN 0718306198
- Beaufighter. William Kimber, London, 1987. ISBN 0718306473
- Royal Air Force Operations, 1918–38. William Kimber, London, 1988. ISBN 0718306716
- The Short Sunderland. Aston Publications, 1989. ISBN 0946627347

=== 1990s ===
- Handley Page Bombers of the First World War. Aston Publications, Bourne End, 1992. ISBN 0946627681
- Halifax & Wellington. Haynes, 1995. (With Brian J. Rapier) ISBN 1856481735
- Royal Air Force, Calshot, 1913–1961. Frank Smith Maritime Aviation Books, 1997. ISBN 0953102300

=== At War series ===
(All published by Ian Allan, London & Weybridge.)

- Mosquito at War, 1973.
- Beaufighter at War, 1976. ISBN 0711007047
- Sunderland at War. Ian Allan, 1976. ISBN 0711006652
- Coastal Command at War, 1979.
- Path Finders at War, 1979. ISBN 0711007578
- Bomber Group at War. Ian Allan, 1981. ISBN 0711010870
- Desert Air Force at War, 1981. (With Christopher F. Shores)
- Wellington at War, 1982. ISBN 0711012202
- Hurricane at War. Ian Allan, 1985. ISBN 0711005648

=== Biographical ===
- Albert Ball, VC. William Kimber, London, 1977. ISBN 0718300459
- For Valour: The Air V.C.s. William Kimber, London, 1978.
- Bomber Barons. William Kimber, London, 1983.
- Eugene Esmonde, V.C., D.S.O. William Kimber, London, 1983. ISBN 0718304098
- Fighter Pilots of the RAF 1939–1945. William Kimber, London, 1984. ISBN 0718305191
- Men of the Desert Air Force, 1940–1943. William Kimber, London, 1984. ISBN 0718305396
- Men of Coastal Command, 1939–45. William Kimber, London, 1985. ISBN 071830554X

=== Edited works ===
- Bartlett, C.P.O. Bomber Pilot, 1916–1918. Edited by Chaz Bowyer. Ian Allan, London, 1974. ISBN 0711005451
- Crundall, E.D. Fighter Pilot on the Western Front. William Kimber, London, 1975. (Uncredited) ISBN 0718301447
- Lewis, G.H. Wings over the Somme, 1916 1918. William Kimber, London, 1976. ISBN 0718303245
- Van Ishoven, Armand. The Fall of an Eagle: The Life of Fighter Ace Ernst Udet. William Kimber, London, 1979. ISBN 071830067X
- Royal Air Force Handbook 1939–1945. Ian Allan, London, 1984. ISBN 0711013187
- Gibson, Guy. Enemy Coast Ahead. Bridge Books, Wrexham, 1995. (Editor and introduction) ISBN 1872424503
- Royal Flying Corps Communiques: 1917–1918. Grub Street, London, 1998. ISBN 1898697795
