= William Bowyer (1663–1737) =

English printer

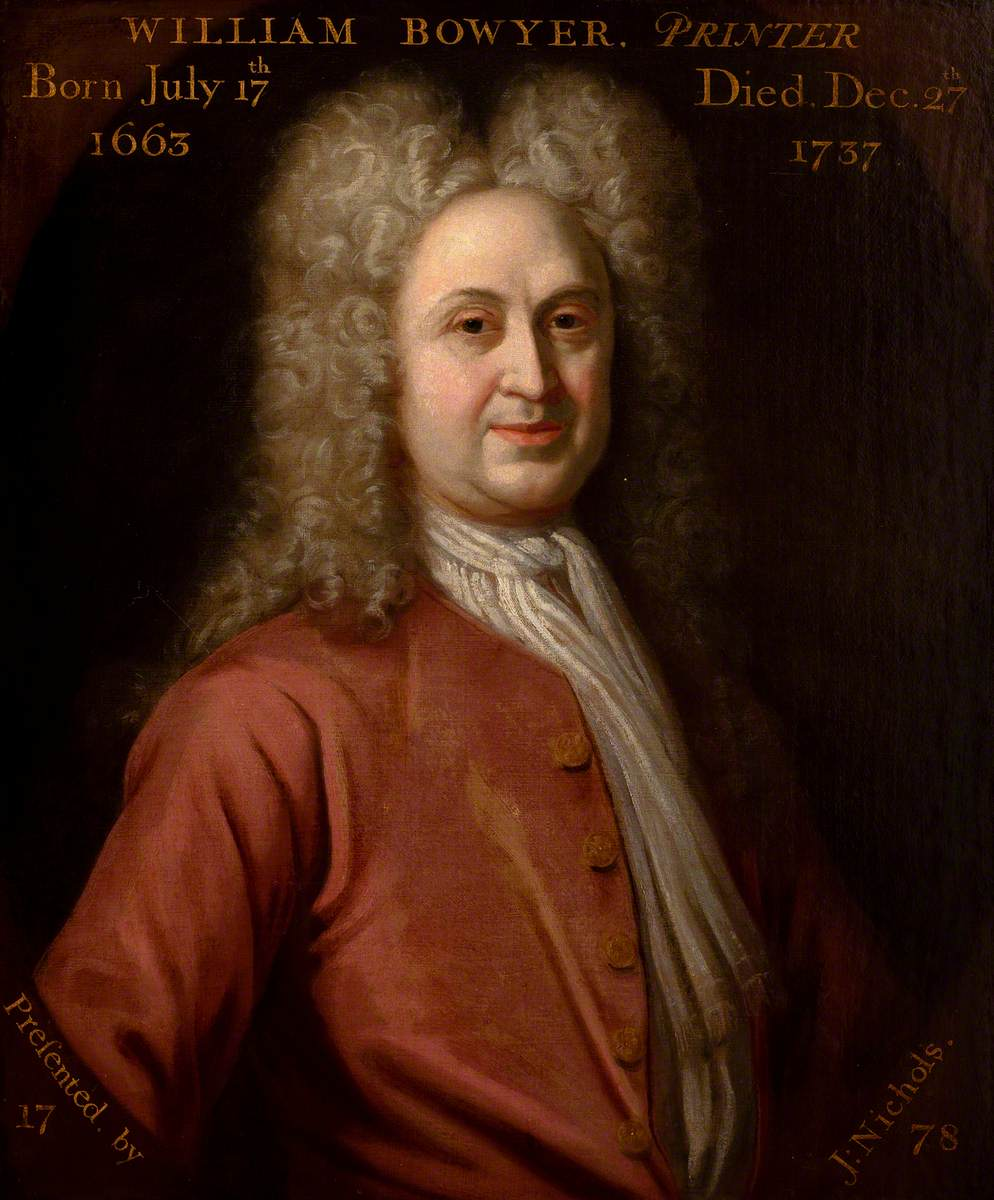
Portrait of William Bowyer by John Vanderbank in Stationers' Hall.

William Bowyer the elder (1663 – 27 December 1737), English printer, was apprenticed to a Miles Flesher in 1679, made a liveryman of The Stationers' and Newspaper Makers' Company in 1700, and nominated as one of the twenty printers allowed by the Star Chamber.

Bowyer originally settled in White Friars, where he remained until January 1712/3, when his printing-house and warehouse were destroyed by fire. Bowyer began printing again on his own in October 1713 in Temple Lane. By 1716, thanks to the grant of a royal warrant for a charitable collection, and the generous support of the London trade, Bowyer was well on his way to economic recovery. William Bowyer, the son, born in 1699, entered the business as a corrector in June 1722. Father and son worked side by side until the former's death in December 1737 and their publishing house was considered the most learned of its time. Although they published such important, learned works as Sir Isaac Newton's Philosophiæ Naturalis Principia Mathematica, they also published political pamphlets and advertising bills.

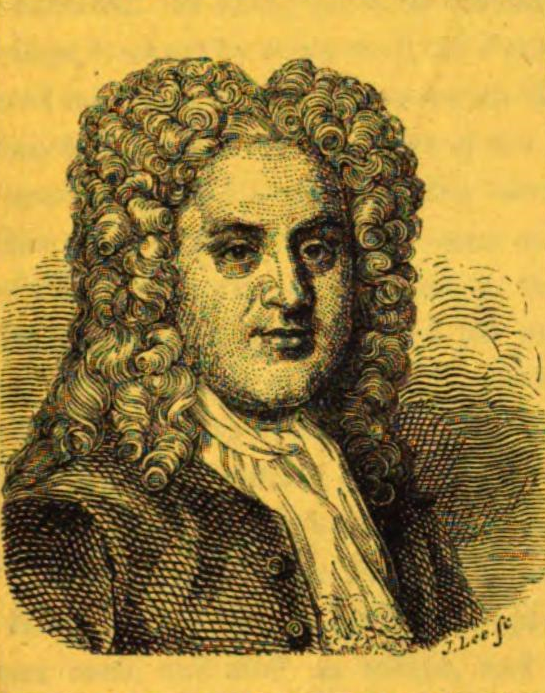
Bowyer in T. C. Hansard's Typographia: an historical sketch of the origin and progress of the art of printing.

The four Bowyer ledgers, kept by father and son, are one of but four printing houses out of the seventy-four master printers in London in 1724, for which records are extant and offer the earliest example by over 20 years.

A main source for the lives of both father and son is John Nichols' Literary anecdotes of the eighteenth century.
