= William Bowyer (printer) =

English printer (1699–1777)

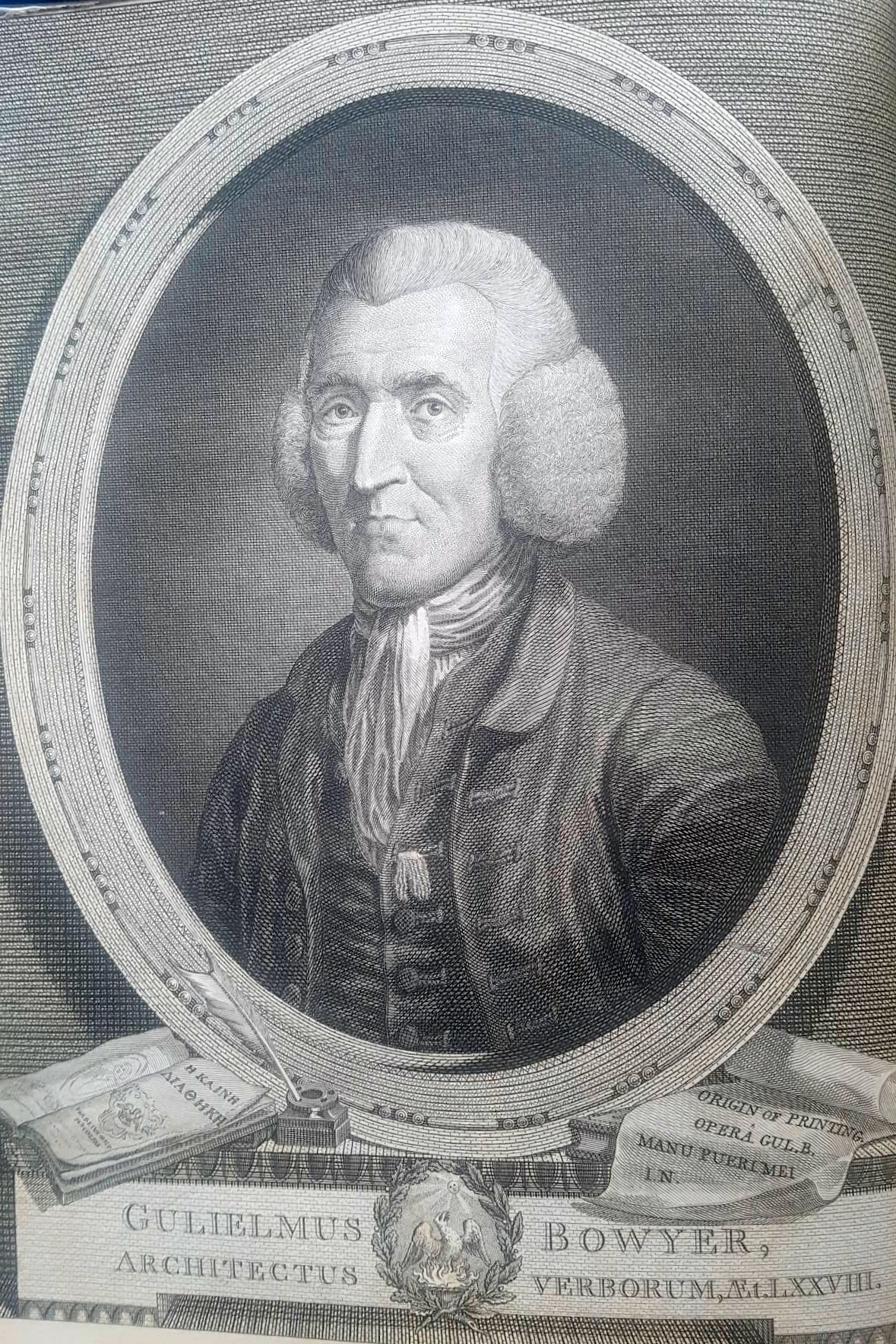
- An engraving of William Bowyer from John Nichols' Anecdotes of William Bowyer
- Born: 19 December 1699; London
- Died: 13 November 1777 (aged 77); Leyton
- Occupations: Printer and publisher
- Years active: 1722-1777

William Bowyer (/ˈboʊjər/; 19 December 1699 – 13 November 1777) was an English printer known as "the learned printer".

== Life ==
Born in London, Bowyer was educated at St John's College, Cambridge, and in 1722 became a partner in his father William Bowyer's business. In 1729 he was appointed printer of the votes of the British House of Commons, and in 1736 printer to the Society of Antiquaries, of which he was elected a fellow in 1737. He was also appointed printer to the Society for the Encouragement of Learning. On the death of his father in 1737 he became the sole owner of the Bowyer press.

In 1759 he took as apprentice John Nichols, who was to be his successor and biographer. Bowyer was also a close collaborator with the prominent London bookseller Andrew Millar.

In 1761 Bowyer became printer to the Royal Society, and in 1767 printer of the rolls of the House of Lords and the journals of the House of Commons. Also in 1767 he moved from Whitefriars to a larger house in Red Lion Passage, Fleet Street. He died leaving unfinished a number of large works and among them the reprint of Domesday Book. He was known as "the learned printer."

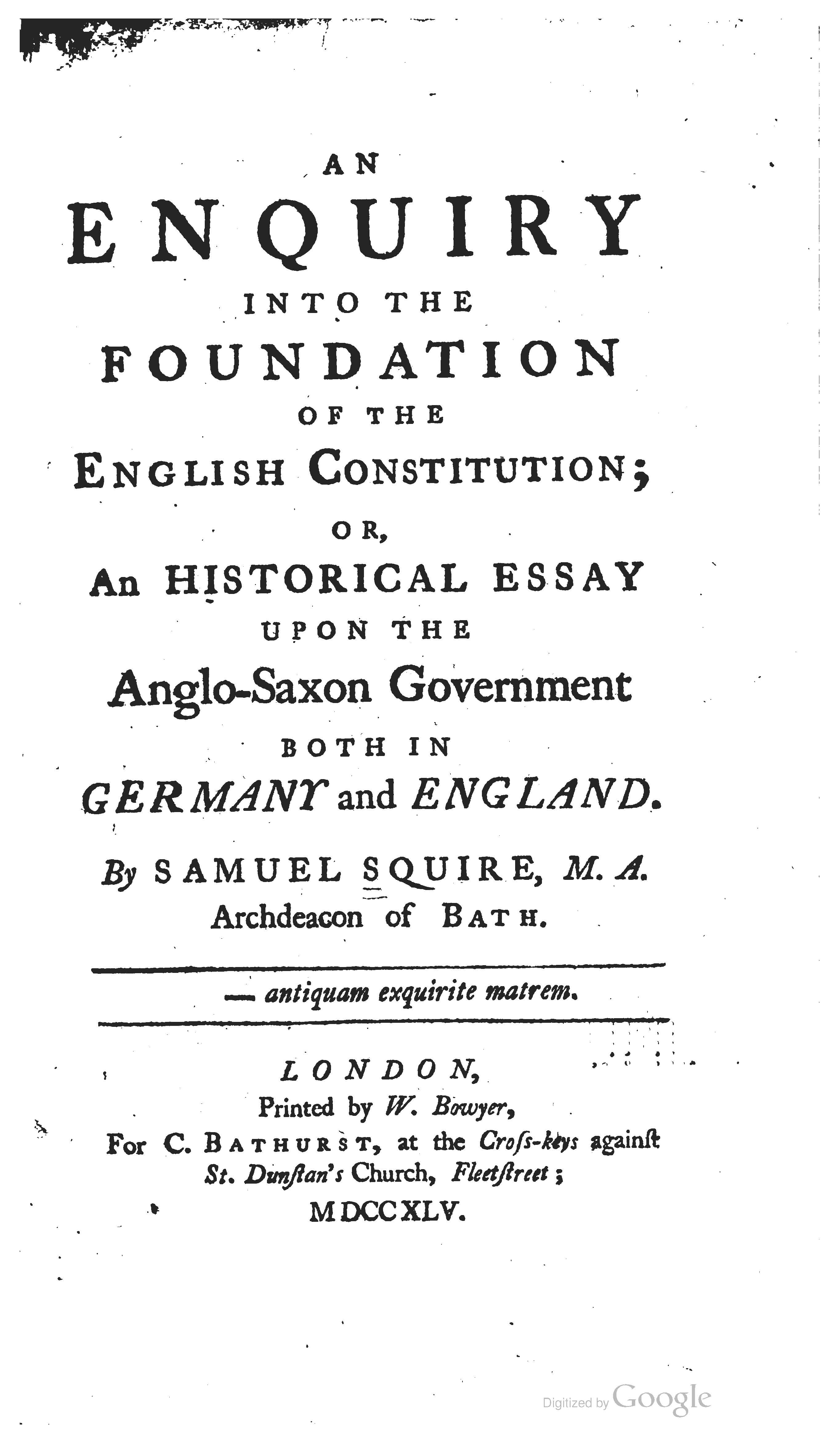
The title page of Samuel Squire's An Enquiry into the Foundation of the English Constitution (1745), which was printed by Bowyer

Bowyer was buried in Leyton parish church, where he has a monument.

== Works ==
Bowyer's major work was an edition of the New Testament in Greek, with notes. Prior to the publication of his critical edition of the New Testament, Bowyer published several editions of the Textus Receptus. He wrote tracts and pamphlets, and edited, arranged and published a host of books. He also edited the Greek-Latin Lexicon of Schrevelius.

== Legacy ==
Bowyer's generous bequests in favour of indigent printers were administered by the Stationers' Company, of which he became a liveryman in 1738. In their hall was his portrait bust and a painting of his father.
