= Adrian Bowyer =

English engineer and mathematician (born 1952)

Adrian Bowyer MBE
- Bowyer in 2025
- Born: 1952 (age 73–74); London, England
- Education: Imperial College London
- Known for: RepRap, Voronoi Diagram
- Website: adrianbowyer.com

Adrian Bowyer /ˈboʊjər/ is an English engineer and mathematician, formerly an academic at the University of Bath.

== Life and works ==
Bowyer talking about the RepRap Project at Poptech 2007

Born in 1952 in London, Bowyer is the older child of the late Rosemary and John Bowyer; the latter was a writer, painter and one of the founders of Zisman, Bowyer and Partners, consulting engineers. Bowyer was educated at Woodroffe School, Lyme Regis and Imperial College London.

In 1977 he joined the Mathematics Department at the University of Bath. Shortly after that he received a doctorate from Imperial College London for research in friction-induced vibration. Whilst working in the Mathematics Department he invented (at the same time as David Watson) the algorithm for computing Voronoi diagrams that bears their names (the Bowyer–Watson algorithm).

A timelapse video of a robot model (logo of Make magazine) being printed using fused deposition modeling on a RepRapPro Fisher printer, a company that Bowyer was a director of.

He then spent twenty-two years as a lecturer then senior lecturer in the Mechanical Engineering Department at the University of Bath. He retired from academic life in 2012, though he is still a director of the company RepRap Ltd. He invented the RepRap Project – an open-source 3D printer that can produce plastic parts, including all such parts for a copy of itself. The Guardian said of this, "[RepRap] has been called the invention that will bring down global capitalism, start a second industrial revolution and save the environment..."

In 2017 Bowyer received the 3D Printing Industry Outstanding Contribution to 3D Printing Award and was inducted into the TCT Hall of Fame. He was appointed a Member of the Order of the British Empire (MBE) in the 2019 New Year Honours for services to 3D Printing.

His wife is a retired school teacher; they have one adult daughter.
