= Tommy Bowyer (footballer) =

English footballer (1895–1940)

Personal information
- Full name: Thomas William Bowyer
- Date of birth: 13 February 1895
- Place of birth: Stoke-upon-Trent, England
- Date of death: 1940 (aged 44–45)
- Height: 5 ft 6 1/2 in (1.69 m)
- Position: Forward

Senior career*
Years	Team	Apps	(Gls)
1918–1919	Stoke	0	(0)
1919–1920	Clapton Orient	21	(6)
1920–1921	Gillingham	0	(0)
1921–1922	Walsall	34	(5)
- * Club domestic league appearances and goals

Thomas William Bowyer (13 February 1895 – 1940) was an English footballer who played in the Football League for Clapton Orient, Gillingham, Stoke and Walsall.

== Career ==
Bowyer was born in Stoke-upon-Trent and joined Stoke during World War I. He played three times for Stoke in 1918–19 and once the War was over and League football resumed Bowyer decided to join Clapton Orient. He scored six goals in 22 for Orient in 1919–20 and he joined Gillingham for the 1920–21 season. But he never made an appearances for the "Gills" and went on to play for Walsall in 1921–22, scoring five goals in 40 matches.

== Career statistics ==
Appearances and goals by club, season and competition
Club	Season	League		FA Cup		Total	
Club	Season	Apps	Goals	Apps	Goals	Apps	Goals
Clapton Orient	1919–20	21	6	1	0	22	6
Gillingham	1920–21	0	0	0	0	0	0
Walsall	1921–22	34	5	6	0	40	5
Career total		55	11	6	0	61	11
