= George Bowyer (singer) =

British musician

George Bowyer had a hit single in the UK Singles Chart in 1998 with the song, "Guardians of the Land". The then 33-year-old agricultural insurance broker George Bowyer, hit the record stores with the backing of the pro-hunting pressure group, the Countryside Alliance.

The single made number 33 in August 1998.
