= 1994 Plzeň municipal election =

| ← 1990 | 18–19 November 1994 | 1998 → |

All 47 seats in the Assembly 23 seats needed for a majority

| | First party | Second party | Third party |
|---|---|---|---|
| Leader | Zdeněk Prosek | Josef Průša | Jiří Maštálka |
| Party | ODS | ČSSD | KSČM |
| Seats won | 16 | 7 | 7 |
| Popular vote | 1,092,246 | 437,162 | 434,202 |
| Percentage | 33.7% | 13.5% | 13.4% |
| | Fourth party | Fifth party | Sixth party |
| Leader | Vladimír Duchek | Roman Dohnal | Josef Krejsa |
| Party | ODA | Lidovci | SPR–RSČ |
| Seats won | 5 | 3 | 2 |
| Popular vote | 327,007 | 170,335 | 165,568 |
| Percentage | 10.1% | 5.3% | 5.1% |
Mayor before election
Zdeněk Mraček
Independent
Elected mayor
Zdeněk Prosek
ODS

Plzeň municipal election in 1994 was held as part of 1994 Czech municipal elections. It was held on 18 and 19 November 1994. It was the first election since dissolution of Czechoslovakia. The Civic Democratic Party has won the election. Zdeněk Prosek became the new Mayor when he replaced Zdeněk Mraček.

== Background ==
Camapgin of ODS was formed centrally. The main motto was "Calmly and responsibly." ODS focused on privatisation during the campaign.

== Results ==
| Party | Votes | % | Seats |
|---|---|---|---|
| Civic Democratic Party | 1,092,246 | 33.68 | 16 |
| Czech Social Democratic Party | 437,162 | 13.48 | 7 |
| Communist Party of Bohemia and Moravia | 434,202 | 13.39 | 7 |
| Civic Democratic Alliance | 327,007 | 10.08 | 5 |
| KDU–ČSL-KDS-KAN | 170,335 | 5.25 | 3 |
| SPR–RSČ-SDČR | 165,568 | 5.11 | 2 |
| Pensioners for Life Security | 163,080 | 5.03 | 2 |
| Democratic Union | 153,392 | 4.73 | 2 |
| Free Democrats (OH) and Independent Candidates | 98,958 | 3.05 | 1 |
| Green Party | 86,896 | 2.68 | 1 |
| Liberal National Social Party | 84,346 | 2.60 | 1 |
| Left Bloc | 12,660 | 0.39 | 0 |
| Businessmen's, Traders' and Farmers' Party | 9,592 | 0.30 | 0 |
| Conservative Party | 7,162 | 0.22 | 0 |

== Aftermath ==
ODS formed coalition with ODA and KDU-ČSL. Zdeněk prosek became the new Mayor.
