= 1990 Plzeň municipal election =

24 November 1990	1994 →

All 51 seats in the Assembly 26 seats needed for a majority

	First party	Second party	Third party
Leader	Zdeněk Prosek		Josef Průša
Party	OF	KSČ	ČSSD
Seats won	23	9	5
Percentage	41.3%	16.4%	7.7%
Mayor before election
Stanislav Loukota
OF
Elected mayor
Zdeněk Mraček
OF

Plzeň municipal election in 1990 was held as part of 1990 Czech municipal elections. It was held on 24 November 1990. Civic Forum has won the highest number of votes. Civic Forum then formed coalition with Social Democrats and Christian Democrats. Zdeněk Mraček became Mayor of Plzeň.

== Campaign ==
The election was held following the Velvet Revolution. Stanislav Loukota became Mayor of Plzeň thanks to the revolution.

Civic Forum was led by Zdeněk Prosek. Themes of party's campaign were tourism, regeneration of Plzeň and creation of a strong potential for the city. Czechoslovak People's Party ran as a part of centrist coalition named Democratic Union that included Czechoslovak Socialist Party and Green Party. Program of the coalition focused on creation of University of West Bohemia and building of Hospital. Christian Democratic Party led coalition of centre-right parties. It opposed politics of Civic Forum in the city and blamed it of broken promises. The main focus was cleaning of public offices from Communists. Social Democratic Party was support of all forms of ownership and creation of jobs. Election was considered a referendum about previous communist regime which led to a strong performance of Civic Forum.

== Results ==
Party	votes	Seats
Civic Forum	41.3%	23
Communist Party of Czechoslovakia	16.4%	9
Czechoslovak Social Democracy	7.7%	5
Czechoslovak People's Party	4.9%	1
Independent candidates	4.4%	0
Christian Democratic Party	3.9%	5
Liberal National Social Party	3.6%	1
SPR–RSČ-SDČR	2.2%	1
Liberal Democratic Party	2.1%	0
Green Party	1.7%	1
Republican Union-Free Bloc	1.4%	0

== Aftermath ==
Civic Forum planned to nominate Zdeněk Prosek for the position of Mayor but Democratic Union was against during the coalition talks. In the end, Civic Forum nominated Zdeněk Mraček who became Mayor afterwards.
