= RepRap Ormerod =

Open source 3D printer

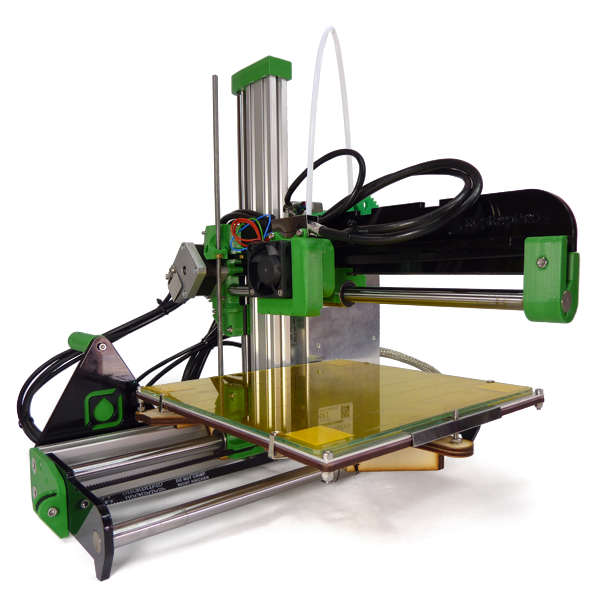
- RepRap Ormerod 2

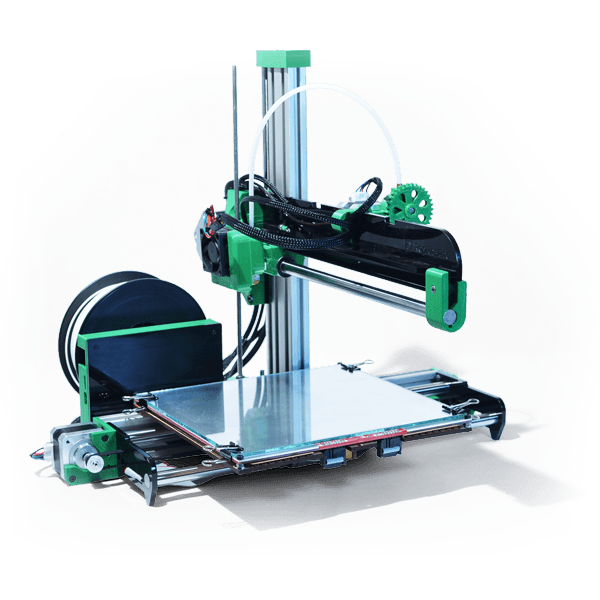
- RepRap Ormerod 1
- Classification: Fused deposition modeling 3D printer
- Inventor: RepRapPro

The RepRap Ormerod is an open-source fused deposition modeling 3D printer and is part of the RepRap project. The RepRap Ormerod is named after the English entomologist Eleanor Anne Ormerod, it was designed by RepRapPro. There have been two versions of the Ormerod, the Ormerod 1 was released in December 2013 and the Ormerod 2 released in December 2014.

The RepRap Ormerod has a 200 mm × 200 mm × 200 mm build volume, uses a Bowden extruder, it also has a micro SD card and USB and Ethernet connections allowing it to be connected to a network. The printer was praised for the simplicity of construction and its low cost.

== See also ==
- RepRap
- Prusa i3
- Prusa Mini
