= Slicer (3D printing) =

Computer software used in 3D printing

A slicer is a toolpath generation software used in 3D printing. It facilitates the conversion of a 3D object model to specific instructions for the printer. The slicer converts a model in STL (stereolithography) format into printer commands in G-code format. This is particularly usable in fused filament fabrication and other related 3D printing processes.

== Features ==
A slicer initially segments the object as a stack of flat layers. It then describes these layers through linear movements of the 3D printer's extruder, the fixation laser, or an equivalent component. All these movements, together with some specific printer commands like the ones to control the extruder temperature or bed temperature, are ultimately compiled in the G-code file. This file can then be transferred to the printer for execution.

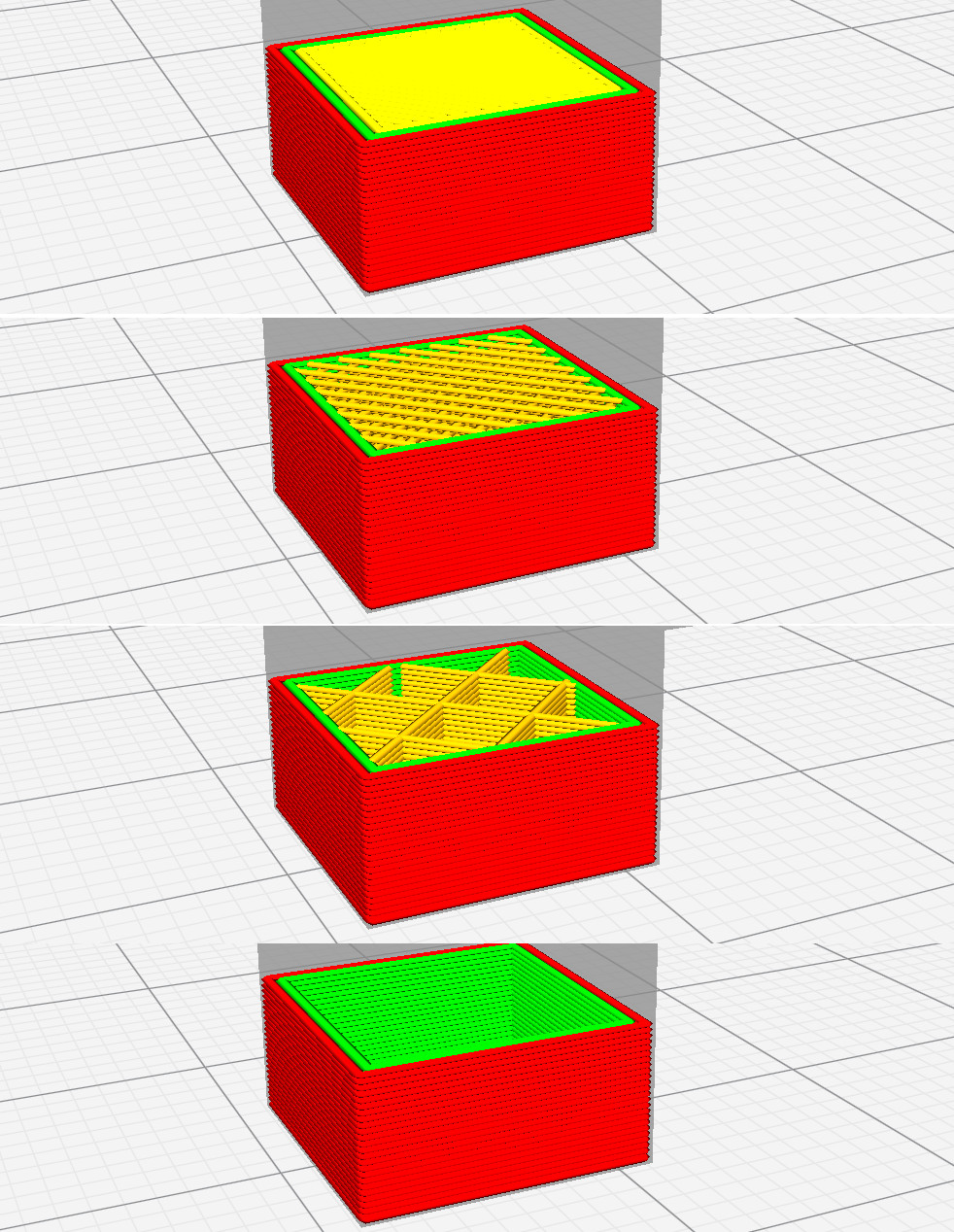
Different densities of infill (in yellow), as generated by Cura slicer, from solid to hollow.

Additional features of slicer are listed below:

- Infill: Printing solid objects requires a significant amount of material (such as filament) and time. To mitigate this, slicers can automatically convert solid volumes to hollow ones, thereby saving costs and reducing print time. These hollow objects can be reinforced with internal structures, like internal walls, to enhance robustness. The proportion of these structures, known as 'infill density', is a key parameter that can be adjusted in the slicer.

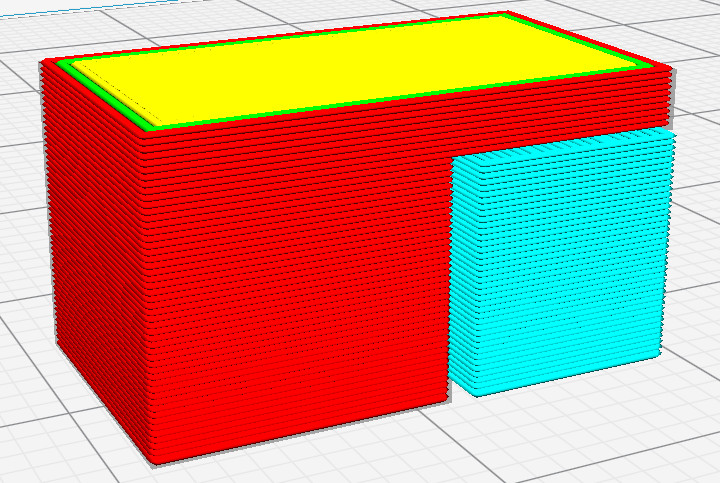
Support structure (in blue) generated by Cura software.

- Supports: Since most 3D printing processes build objects layer by layer, from the bottom up, each new layer is deposited directly on top of the previous one. Consequently, every part of the object must, to some extent, rest on another part. For layers that are 'floating'—for example, the flat roof of a house or a horizontally extended arm in a figure—the slicer can automatically add supports. These supports are designed to touch the object in a manner that allows for easy detachment upon the completion of the object's production. The two main types of support are the standard lattice, in a zig-zag pattern (shown in image to right) and a tree structure where a main branch attaches to the print bed and grows arms to support overhangs. Tree supports are considered easier to remove and consume less filament.

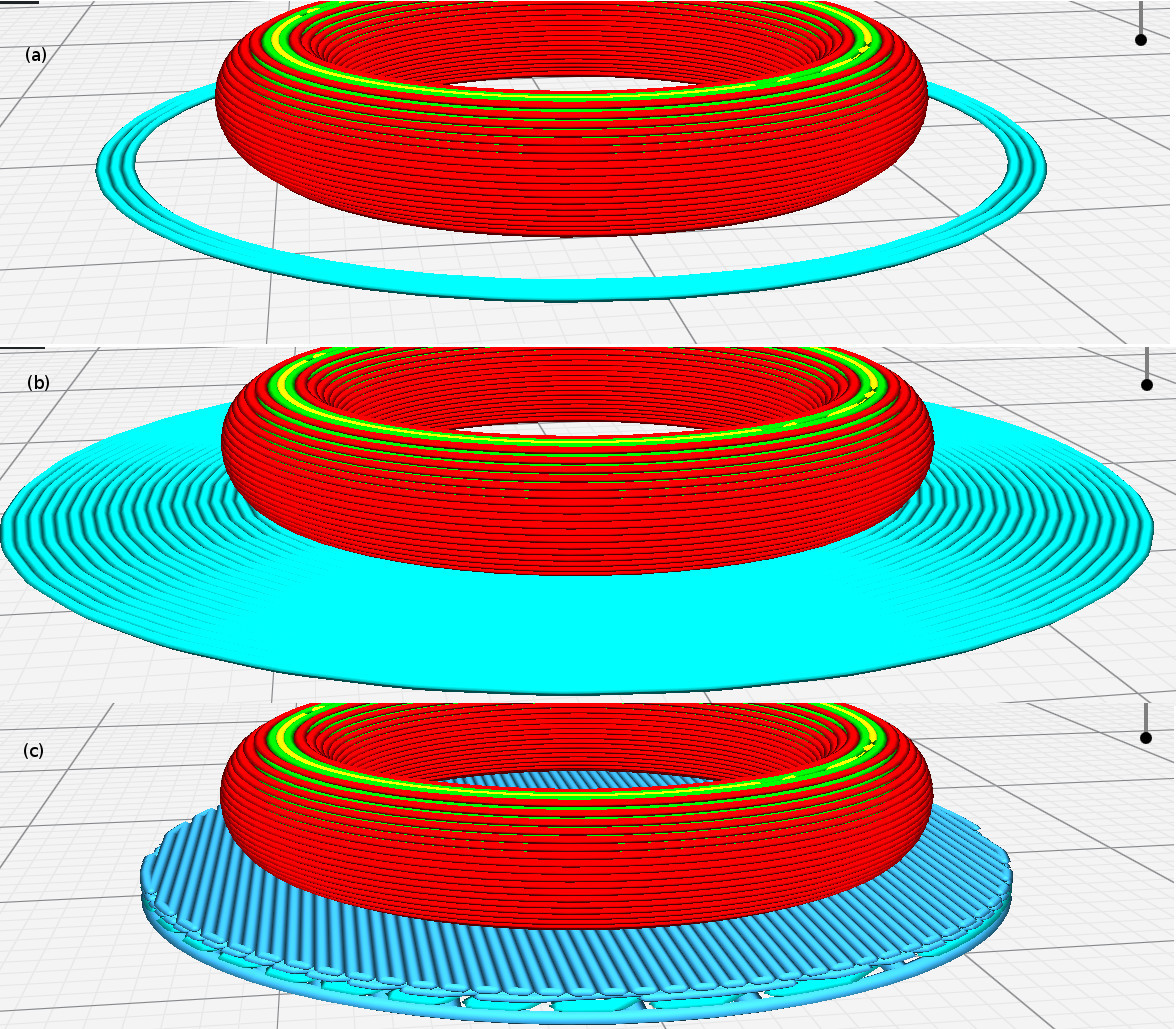
Comparative of base layers (in blue): a) skirt; b) brim; c) raft, generated by Cura software

- Rafts, skirts and brims: The printing of the first object layer, which contacts the printer bed, presents unique challenges, such as adherence issues, surface rugosity, and the smooth deposition of the initial filament. To mitigate these problems, the slicer can automatically add detachable structures. Common types of these base structures include:
  - A skirt: A single band encircling the object's base, without touching it.
  - A brim: Multiple lines of filament around the base of the object, touching but not underneath it, and extending outward.
  - A raft: Several layers of material forming a detachable base on which the object is printed.

== List of slicer software ==
There is a diverse array of slicer applications available, including many that are free and open source. Some of the most commonly used ones include:

Name	License	Relations
Ultimaker Cura	GNU LGPL	
OrcaSlicer	GNU AGPL	Fork of BambuStudio
BambuStudio	GNU AGPL	Fork of PrusaSlicer
SuperSlicer	GNU AGPL	Fork of PrusaSlicer
PrusaSlicer	GNU AGPL	Fork of Slic3r
Slic3r	GNU AGPL	
Creality Print	GNU AGPL	Based on Cura; Fork of OrcaSlicer
Simplify3D	Proprietary	
Realvision online	Proprietary	Online slicer
