= Prusa Research =

Czech 3D printer manufacturer

Prusa Research a.s.
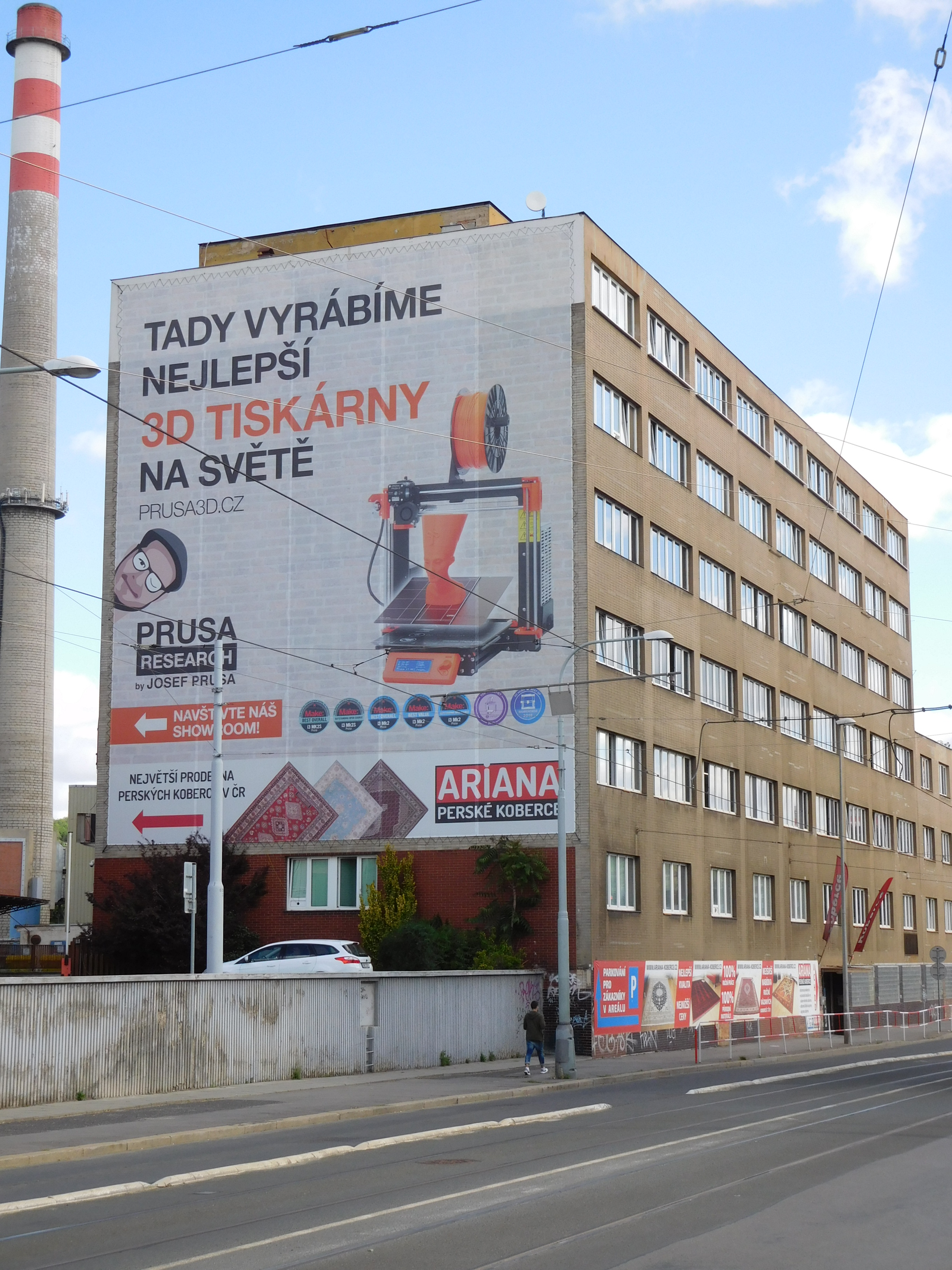
- Type: Private
- Industry: 3D printing
- Founded: 2012; 14 years ago
- Founder: Josef Průša
- Headquarters: Prague, Czech Republic
- Products: 3D printers, printing materials and software
- Revenue: CZK 3.65 billion (2024)
- Operating income: CZK 150 million (2024)
- Net income: CZK 47.3 million (2024)
- Total assets: CZK 1.899 billion (2024)
- Number of employees: 1,000 (2024)
- Website: www.prusa3d.com

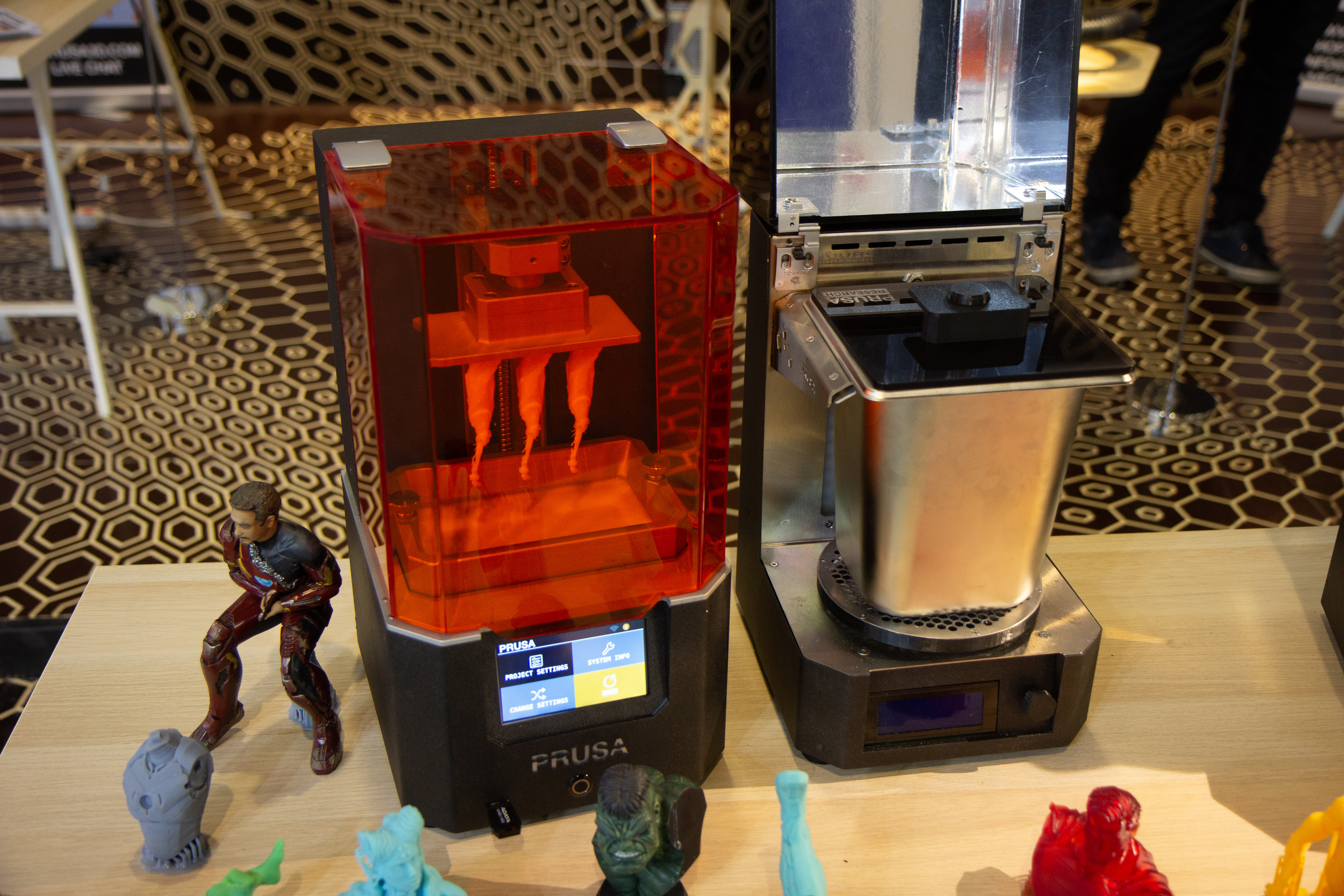
The discontinued SLA printer Prusa SL1, the predecessor of the SL1S printer

Prusa Research a.s., commonly referred to as Prusa, is a Czech company that produces 3D printers, and was the world's second largest 3D printer manufacturer in 2020.

It was founded in 2012 by Josef Průša, a developer in the RepRap project which has an emphasis on building open-source hardware. In the past, all printers produced by the company were open source – their design plans were available online and anyone could use them.

As of 2023, the company started partially abandoning open-source concept due to competition; as their software was being used by a direct competitor Bambu Lab. In 2025, it released CORE One frame designs under its Open Community License, which places restrictions commercial use.

== Hardware ==
Prusa Research as of 2026 offers FDM printers Prusa MINI+, Prusa MK4S, Prusa CORE One+ (Gen 2), Prusa CORE One L+ and XL+. The MINI+ and MK4S are open-frame printers with moving print beds. The enclosed CORE One models use CoreXY mechanisms.

Prusa offers add-ons for printing with multiple colours or materials, MMU3 and INDX. These are available separately for compatible printers.

Several models are available as lower-priced assembly kits containing the parts and tools needed to build the printer. Prusa also sells kits for upgrading older printers to newer models. For example, owners can upgrade an MK3S-series printer to the MK4S, or convert an MK4S into a CORE One+.

The company’s SL1S SPEED printer makes finely detailed objects from liquid resin using masked stereolithography. It cures entire layers at once using UV light, allowing multiple items to be printed simultaneously.

For industrial customers, Prusa offers the Pro HT90 and the Automated Farm System (AFS). The HT90 has a chamber heated to 90 °C and interchangeable printheads for working with engineering plastics such as PEEK and PEI. The AFS combines nine printers with an automated arm that collects finished prints and replaces the print sheets.

== Software ==
Prusa Research also develops its own software.

=== PrusaSlicer ===
Prusa Research software products includes the open-source PrusaSlicer (GNU Affero General Public License v3.0), based on Alessandro Ranellucci's Slic3r, a well-known 3D model preparation program that is no longer being updated with new features and settings. In PrusaSlicer, profiles can be created for any 3D printer on the market, meaning that one does not need to own a Prusa printer to use the program.

=== Prusa EasyPrint ===
Prusa EasyPrint is a lightweight web-based tool for online slicing 3D models. It processes models in the cloud using the PrusaSlicer, making 3D printing easily accessible from any device. It offers basic model manipulation and print settings, specifically designed for ease of use by beginners and professionals.

=== Prusa Connect ===
Prusa Connect lets users monitor printers, send files and manage print jobs over the internet. It can manage individual printers or groups of machines in a print farm. PrusaLink provides monitoring and control over a local network without an internet connection.

The Prusa app for Android and iOS gives users access to Prusa Connect from a phone or tablet. They can check printing progress, start, pause or cancel prints, and receive notifications. The app also lets users browse Printables and prepare models for printing through EasyPrint.

=== Printables ===
Printables.com is an online library of 3D models developed by Prusa, where users can share their models, alterations to other models, called Remixes, and publish their printed results under the author's original model. It thus competes directly with platforms such as MakerWorld from Bambu Lab or Thingiverse. The EasyPrint feature is now available for Prusa printers, enabling cloud slicing for printing from mobile devices or less powerful computers.

== Operations and manufacturing ==
Prusa Research’s factories are located in Czechia and the US. Its Prague operations are split between Holešovice, where it makes printers, and Libeň, where it produces filament. It also has production facilities in Hradec Králové. The group’s tooling company, Prusa Tools, makes injection moulds and other tools used in manufacturing.

Many plastic parts for new printers are made on the company’s own machines. In August 2026, its Prague print farm had about 800 printers, and its filament factory had 23 production lines. Prusa also assembles its own circuit boards. Its printing materials are sold under the Prusament name, with codes on each spool allowing customers to check production measurements. In 2025, the company made approximately 122,000 printers, 933 tonnes of Prusament and more than 10 million printed plastic parts.

In Delaware, its subsidiary Prusa USA, formerly Printed Solid, makes printers and filament and handles shipping and repairs for American customers.

== Open-source and licensing ==
Due to the open source nature of products based on the Prusa designs, Prusa trademarked the name Original Prusa to differentiate from Prusa Research's open source products. Current products not denoted with the Original Prusa name are not completely open source.
