= 1998 Plzeň municipal election =

- 13–14 November 1998

All 47 seats in the Assembly 23 seats needed for a majority

	First party	Second party	Third party
Leader	Jiří Šneberger	Josef Průša	Miroslav Pihrt
Party	ODS	ČSSD	KSČM
Seats won	15	11	6
Popular vote	686,224	528,097	270,196
Percentage	31.7%	24.4%	12.5%
	Fourth party	Fifth party	Sixth party
Leader	Jaroslav Kadlec	Petr Náhlík	Vladimír Duchek
Party	US–DEU	Christian and Democratic Union – Czechoslovak People's Party	PVP
Seats won	4	4	3
Popular vote	189,326	161,692	155,784
Percentage	8.7%	7.5%	7.2%
Mayor before election
Zdeněk Prosek
ODS
Elected mayor
Jiří Šneberger
ODS

Plzeň municipal election in 1998 was held as part of Czech municipal elections, 1998. It was held on 13 and 14 November 1998. The election was won by the Civic Democratic Party (ODS). Jiří Schneberger became the new Mayor. ODS was led by Jiří Šneberger while Czech Social Democratic Party (ČSSD) was led by university professor Josef Průša. ODS and ČSSD formed Grand coalition after the election.

== Campaign ==
Civic Democrats focused on fight against gambling during campaign.

== Results ==
Party	Votes	%	Seats
Civic Democratic Party	686,224	31.66	15
Czech Social Democratic Party	528,097	24.36	11
Communist Party of Bohemia and Moravia	270,196	12.47	6
Freedom Union – Democratic Union	189,326	8.73	4
Christian and Democratic Union – Czechoslovak People's Party	161,692	7.46	4
Right Choice for Plzeň	155,784	7.19	3
Democratic Union	44,687	2.06	1
Green Party-Independent Candidates	41,767	1.93	1
Civic Democratic Alliance	38,080	1.76	1
Party for Secure Life	26,231	1.21	1
Czech Right	12,346	0.57	0
Republican Union	10,650	0.49	0
Independent Candidates	2,508	0.12	0
Total	2,167,588	100	47
