= PrusaSlicer =

3D printer slicing software

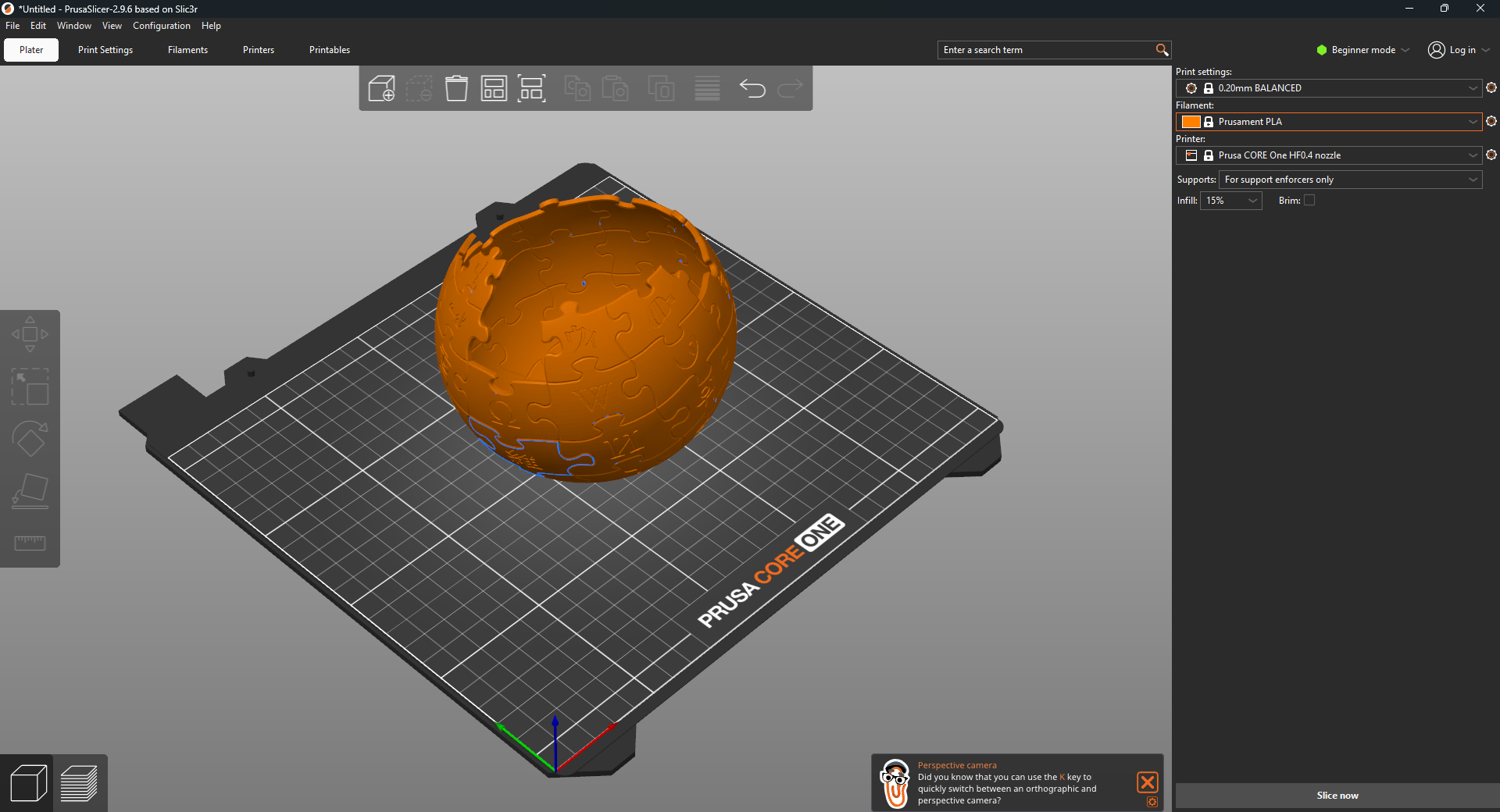
- Screenshot of PrusaSlicer 2.9.6 running on Windows 11.
- Stable release: 2.9.4 / November 7, 2025; 8 months ago
- Operating system: Microsoft Windows, Mac OS X, Linux
- Type: 3D printer slicing application
- License: GNU AGPL
- Website: www.prusa3d.com/p/prusaslicer/
- Repository: https://github.com/prusa3d/prusaslicer

PrusaSlicer (formerly known as Slic3r Prusa Edition or Slic3r PE) is free and open-source slicer software developed by Prusa Research. It is used to prepare models for 3D printing on both FFF and MSLA (SLA) 3D printers, and can be also used to manage Prusa printers remotely via integrated Prusa Connect and browse the Printables model database.

PrusaSlicer is available for Windows, macOS, and Linux. It is licensed under the GNU Affero General Public License v3.0 (AGPLv3) and is based on the older open-source project, Slic3r.

== History ==
The Slic3r project originated in 2011 within the RepRap community as an open-source slicer led by Alessandro Ranellucci.

Until 2016, Prusa Research relied solely on Slic3r. As the company grew, it required faster development and implementation of new features. According to the company, the cooperation with the original Slic3r development team became unsustainable, which led to the decision in 2016 to create a dedicated fork of the project named Slic3r Prusa Edition.

In May 2019, with the release of version 2.0, the software underwent an extensive user interface overhaul and was renamed PrusaSlicer. The reasons for the name change, according to the company, were to differentiate it from the original project, from which its codebase was increasingly diverging, and to prevent confusion among users. As part of its development, the original Perl code was also progressively rewritten into C++.

Both projects, PrusaSlicer and Slic3r, continue to exist concurrently.

== Supported Printers ==
While it is primarily designed for original Prusa 3D printers, PrusaSlicer is also compatible with other manufacturers' printers that support FFF or MSLA technology.

== Prusa EasyPrint ==
In May 2024, Prusa Research introduced the cloud service Prusa EasyPrint, a simple cloud based slicer alternative accessible via web based interface and through an app for iOS and Android. The same year, Prusa Slicer was also integrated into 3DPrinterOS.
