= Prusa Mini =

Czech open-source fused deposition modelling 3D printer

Original Prusa MINI
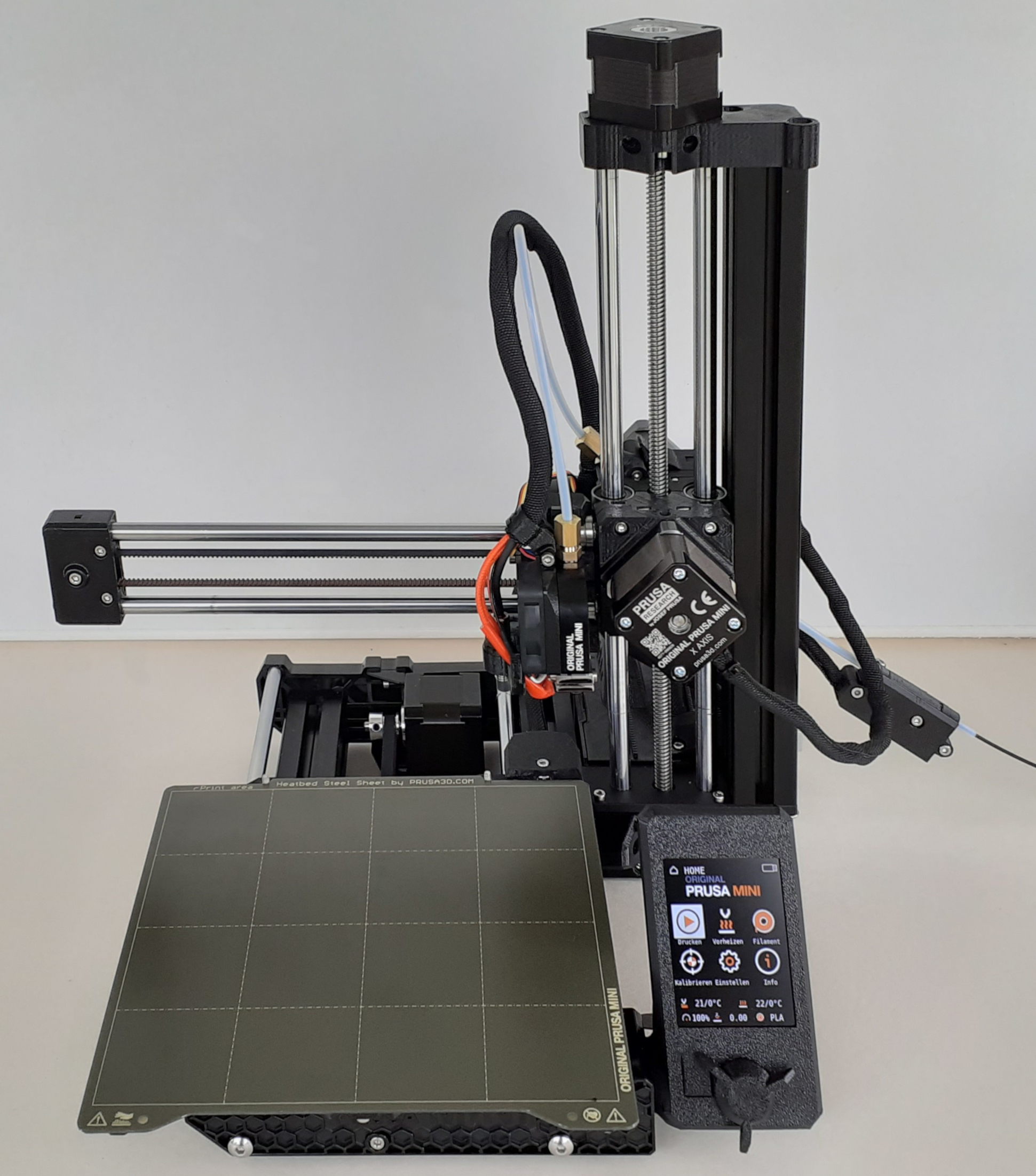
- Prusa Mini+ Black Edition
- Classification: Fused deposition modeling 3D printer
- Inventor: Josef Průša
- Manufacturer: Prusa Research

The Prusa Mini, stylized as the Original Prusa MINI, is an open-source fused deposition modeling 3D printer that is manufactured by the Czech company Prusa Research. The printer is the lowest cost machine produced by Prusa Research and is designed as a first printer or as part of a 'print farm'.

== Specifications ==
=== Mini ===
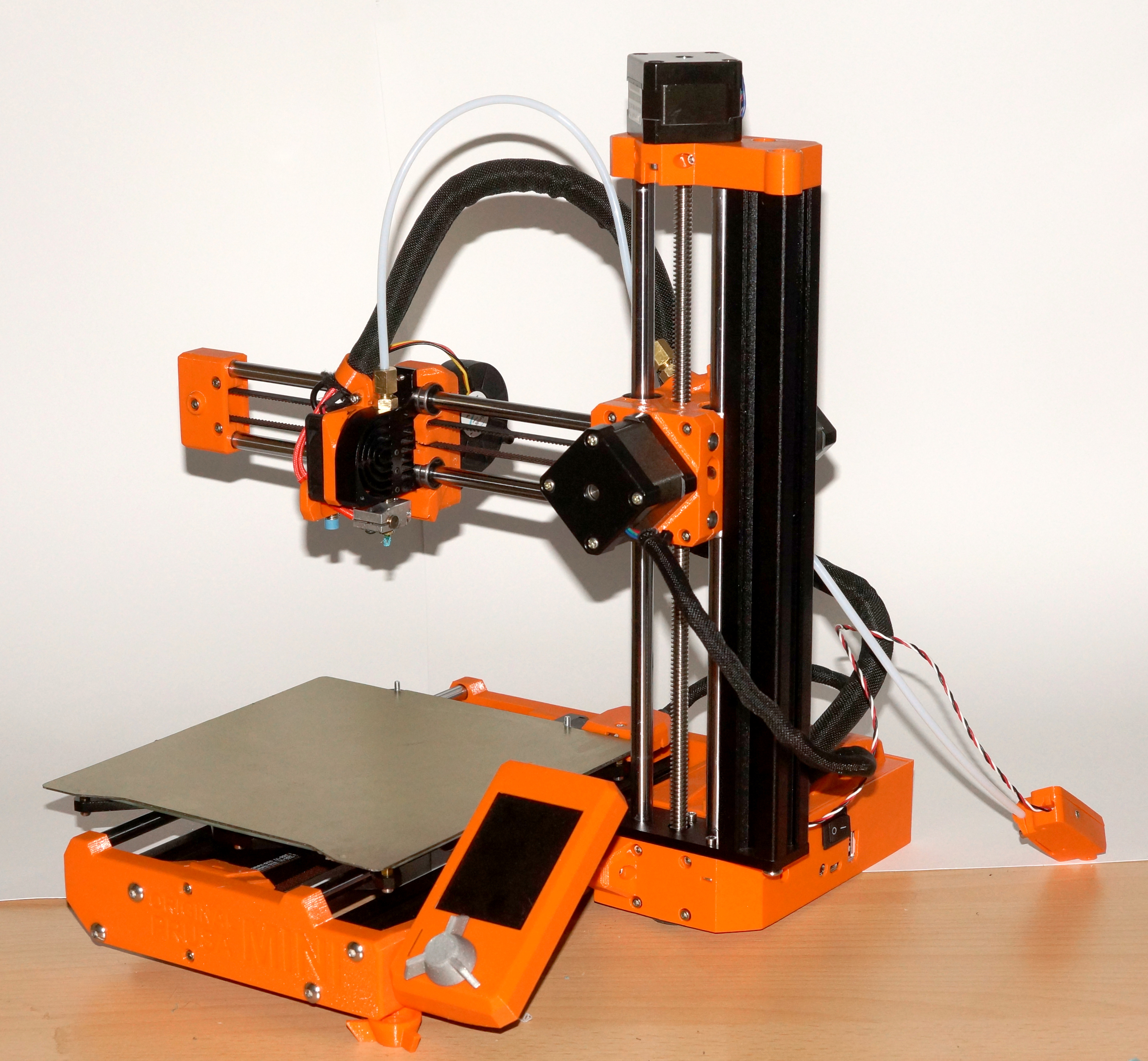
Prusa Mini Clone

The Prusa Mini was officially launched in October 2019. The printer is available either partially assembled or as a kit. The build volume is 180 x 180 x 180 mm, and the print is performed on a spring steel sheet, which is meant to be easy to remove. Minimum layer resolution is 50 micrometers, and the maximum travel speed is 200 millimeters per second. The maximum nozzle temperature is 280°C and the maximum heatbed temperature is 100°C. The printer has an LCD color display (non-touch), is able to print via USB drives. It has a custom 32-bit mainboard and a built-in online firmware updater. The printer has sensorless homing using Trinamic 2209 drivers and has a custom hot end which supports E3D nozzles.

It has several safety features including three thermistors to detect thermal runaway.

=== Mini+ ===
In November 2020, the Prusa Mini was replaced by the Mini+, which featured a few small updates meant to ease assembly and maintenance. One of the changes was a new mesh bed levelling sensor called "SuperPINDA" which replaced the previous "MINDA" sensor, and it is claimed by the manufacturer that this should result in a more consistent calibration of the first print layer in particular. The Mini+ filament sensor is an optional extra.

=== Upgrades ===
In September 2023, Prusa Research announced that upcoming Mini and Mini+ firmware would include network remote management using the PrusaConnect service, and input shaping for faster printing with no physical changes to the printer needed.

The printer is the first open source hardware product to require a user wishing to use unsigned firmware to physically break off a piece of the PCB, voiding the printer's warranty, before it can be flashed onto the board. This is intended to reduce Prusa's liability should someone create custom firmware with potential to cause harm (such as disabling thermal runaway protections or other safety features).

== Reception ==
Prusa Mini was selected as The Best 3D Printer by The Wirecutter in 2021, and continued to feature until 2023.

== See also ==
- Prusa i3
- RepRap Ormerod
