= Slic3r =

3D printer slicing software

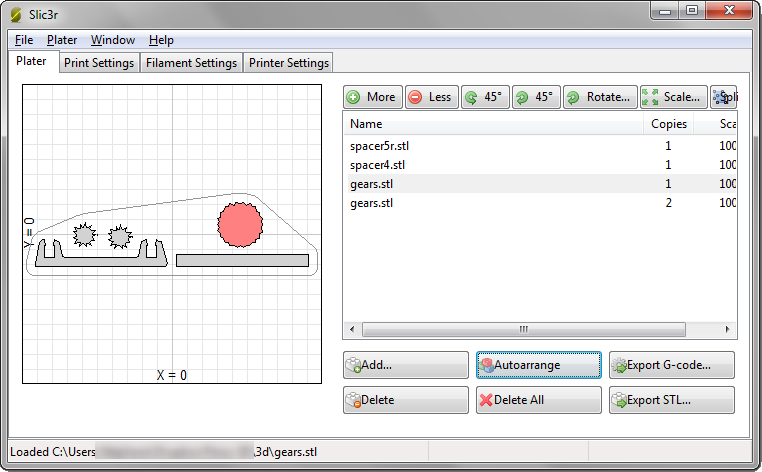
- Original author(s): Alessandro Ranellucci
- Stable release: 1.3.0 / May 10, 2018; 7 years ago
- Repository: github.com/alexrj/Slic3r
- Operating system: Microsoft Windows, Mac OS X, Linux
- Type: 3D printer slicing application
- License: GNU AGPL
- Website: slic3r.org

Slic3r is free software 3D slicing engine for 3D printers. It generates G-code from 3D CAD files (STL or OBJ). Once finished, an appropriate G-code file for the production of the 3D modeled part, or object is sent to the 3D printer for the manufacturing of a physical object. As of 2013, about half of the 3D printers tested by Make Magazine supported Slic3r.

Prusa Research maintains an advanced fork called PrusaSlicer.

SuperSlicer is a further fork of PrusaSlicer.

== See also ==
- List of 3D printing software
