= Prusa i3 =

Czech 3D printer series

- A Prusa i3 MK2 print farm producing parts for new printers
- Classification: Fused filament fabrication 3D printer
- Inventor: Josef Průša
- Manufacturer: Prusa Research

The Prusa i3 is a family of fused filament fabrication 3D printers, manufactured by Czech company Prusa Research under the trademarked name Original Prusa i3. Part of the RepRap project, Prusa i3 printers were called the most used 3D printer in the world in 2016. The first Prusa i3 was designed by Josef Průša in 2012, and was released as a commercial kit product in 2015. The latest model (Prusa MK4S on sale as of August 2024) is available in both kit and factory assembled versions. The Prusa i3's comparable low cost and ease of construction and modification made it popular in education and with hobbyists and professionals, with the Prusa i3 model MK2 printer receiving several awards in 2016.

The i3 series is released under an open source license, which has led to many other companies and individuals producing variants and clones of the design. The i3 moniker refers to the printer being the third iteration of the design. It was used up until the Prusa i3 MK3 and its variants but was dropped from the model, Prusa MK4.

== Models ==
=== RepRap Mendel ===
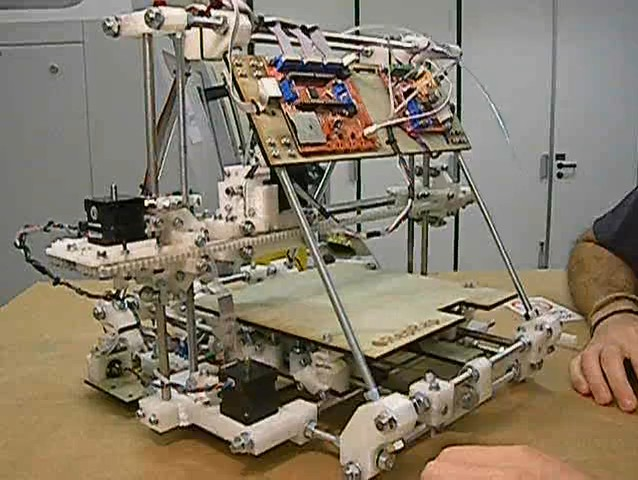
RepRap Mendel

First conceived in 2009, RepRap Mendel 3D printers were designed to be assembled from 3D printed parts and commonly available off-the-shelf components (referred to as "vitamins," as they cannot be produced by the printer itself). These parts include threaded rods, leadscrews, smooth rods and bearings, screws, nuts, stepper motors, control circuit boards, and a "hot end" to melt and place thermoplastic materials. A Cartesian mechanism permits placement of material anywhere in a cubic volume; this design has continued throughout development of the i3 series. The flat "print bed" (the surface on which parts are printed) is movable in one axis (Y), while two horizontal and two vertical rods permit tool motion in two axes, designated X and Z respectively.

=== Prusa Mendel ===
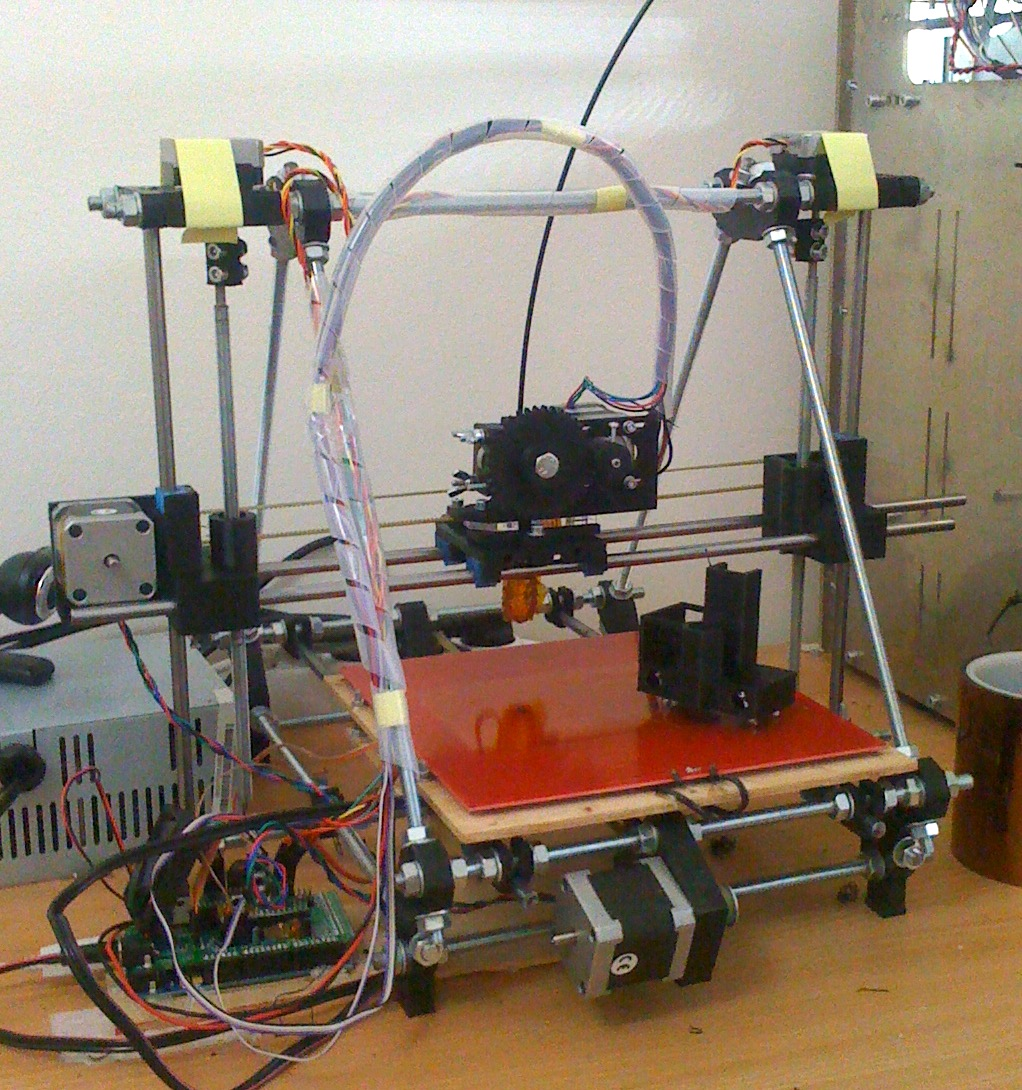
Prusa Mendel

Josef Průša was a core developer of the RepRap project who had previously developed a PCB heated "print bed". He adapted and simplified the RepRap Mendel design, reducing the time to print 3D plastic parts from 20 to 10 hours, changing to the use of two Z-axis motors to simplify the frame, and including 3D printed bushings in place of regular bearings. First announced in September 2010, the printer was dubbed Prusa Mendel by Průša himself. According to the RepRap wiki, "Prusa Mendel is the Ford Model T of 3D printers."

=== Prusa Mendel (Iteration 2) ===
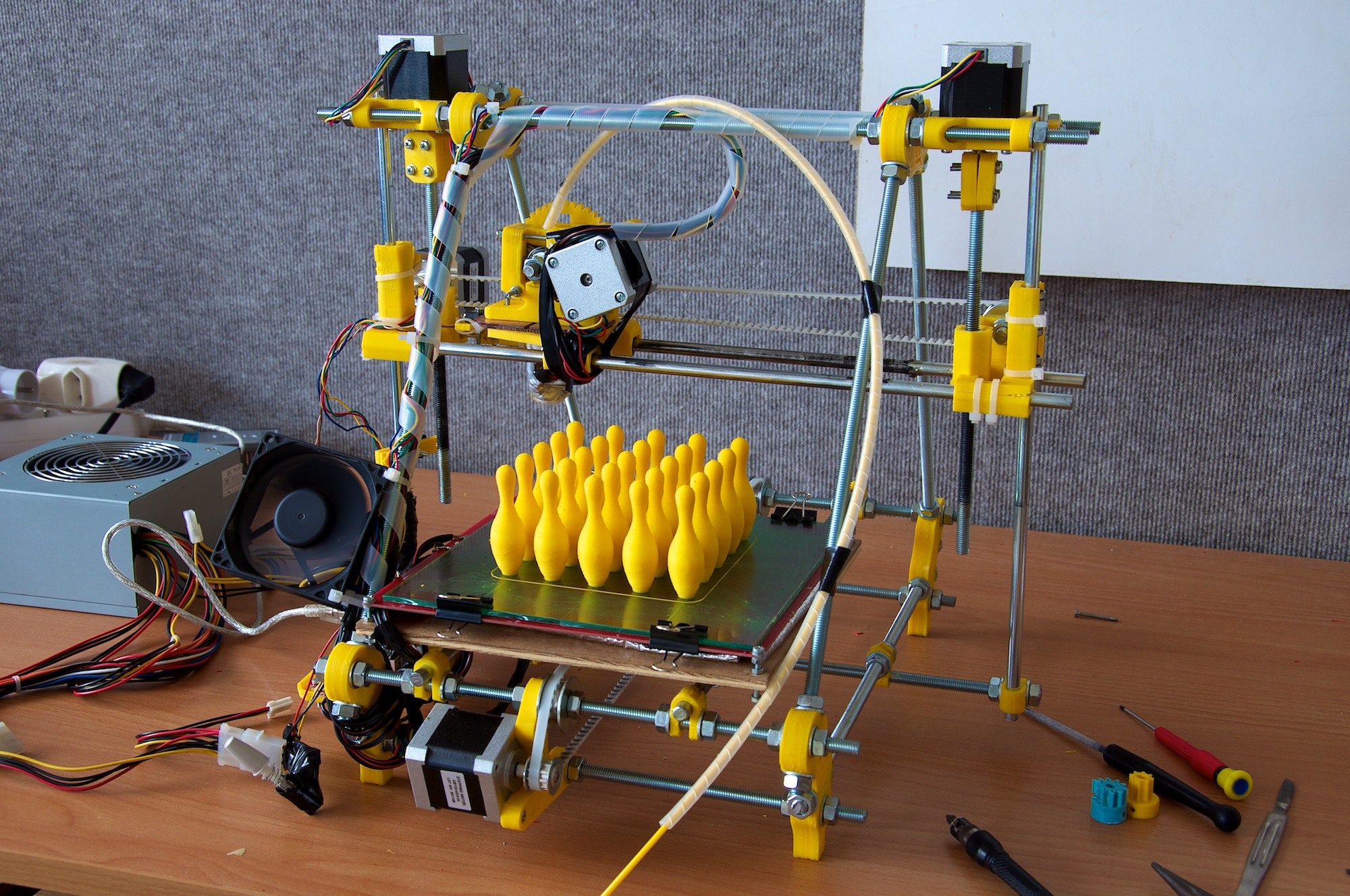
Prusa Mendel (iteration 2)

Průša streamlined his Mendel design, releasing "Prusa Iteration 2" in November 2011. Parts changes allowed for snap-fit assembly (no glue required); fewer tools were needed to construct and maintain this version. Although not required, fine-pitch manufactured pulleys and LM8UU linear bearings were recommended over printed equivalents for "professional" results.

=== Mendel90 ===
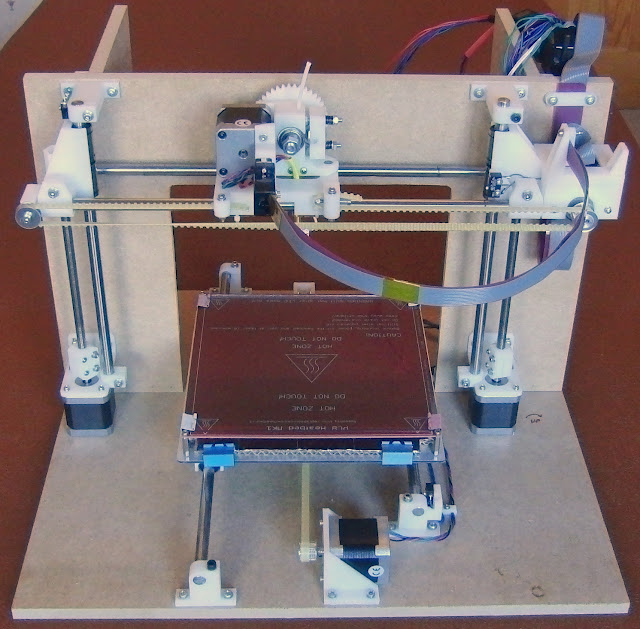
Mendel90 gantry-frame printer, 2011

It was clear to the RepRap community that the threaded-rod, triangular Z axis frame construction was limited in strength and stability, and that it would be necessary for the printer's footprint to grow substantially for the maximum printing height to increase. Chris Palmer (posting as "Nophead") created "Mendel90" in December 2011, a printer using a gantry-style MDF frame. It improved printing speed and accuracy by replacing the upper supports on the Mendel frame (which were easily skewed or twisted out of alignment if not properly tightened) with a rigid frame cut from solid sheet material, assembled as one structural and two mechanical planes at 90 degree angles from one another. Prusa's two Z-axis motors were moved from floating mounts at the top to being fixed to the bottom of the vertical frame, and a Dibond composite panel made for a rigid mounting plate for the heated bed.

=== Prusa i3 and i3 1.75 mm ===
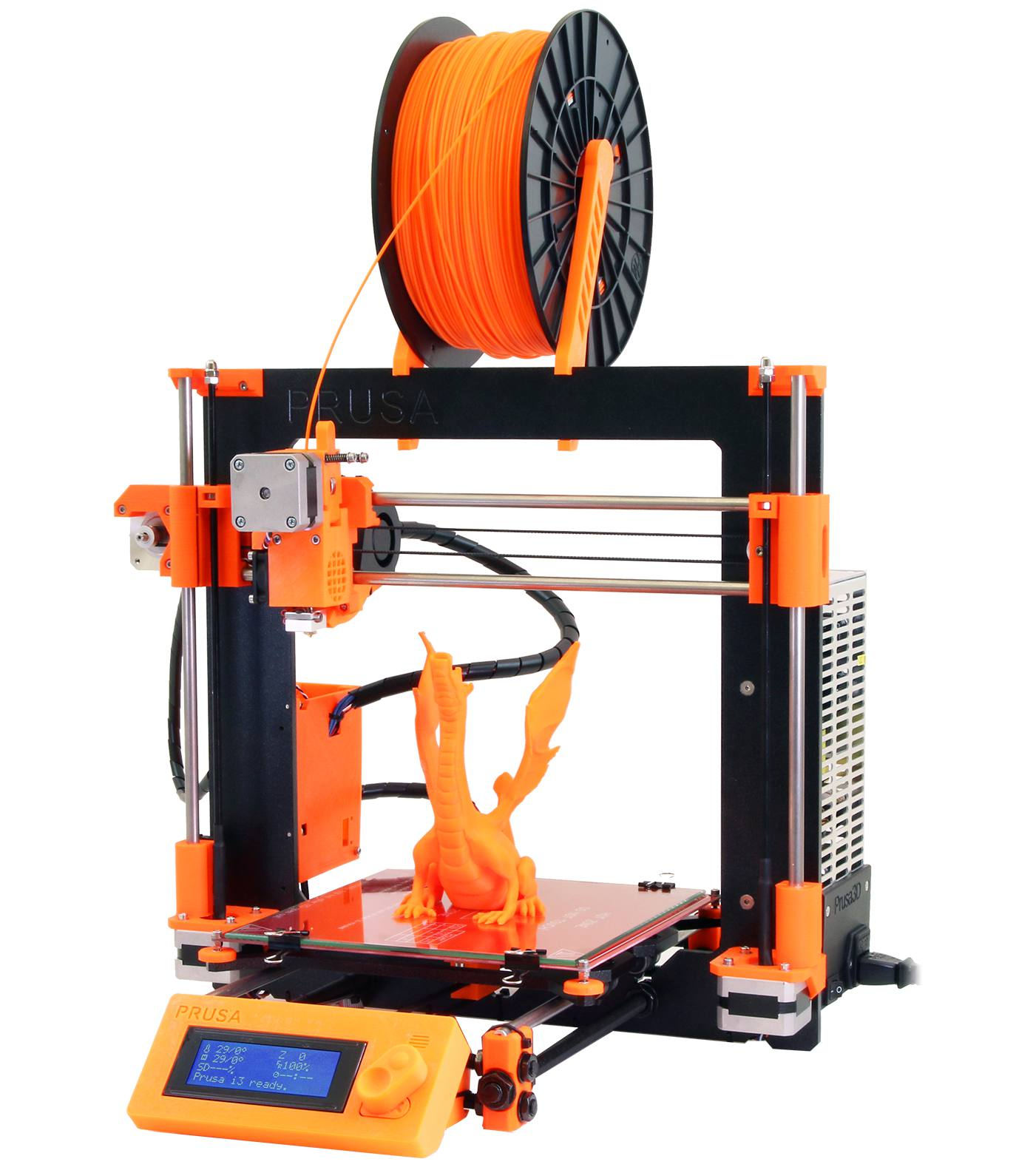
Prusa i3

In May 2012, Průša released a major redesign, focused on ease of construction and use, and no longer structured around the simplest available common hardware as previous RepRap printers were. The Prusa i3 used a rigid, single-piece water jet cut aluminium vertical frame with a large opening for the printing area and hard mounting points for the Z-axis components, similar to the Mendel90. A second frame piece served as a lightweight mount for the heated bed. Rather than having a baseplate, Prusa retained the M10 threaded rods to support the heated bed Y-axis. It used a single piece, food safe stainless steel hot end called the Prusa Nozzle which printed with 3 mm filament, and used M5 threaded rods as lead screws instead of M8.

In May 2015, Průša released an i3 full kit under the brand name "Original Prusa i3". After finding that 1.75 mm filament was far more common than 3 mm, Průša dropped the Prusa Nozzle and redesigned the extruder around a third-party hot end, the E3D V6-Lite. Noting that print quality was much improved, he introduced the new i3 1.75 mm version in August 2015. The original model was retrospectively dubbed MK0 or "Mark zero," while the new model came to be known as the "MK1."

=== Prusa i3 MK2 and MK2S ===
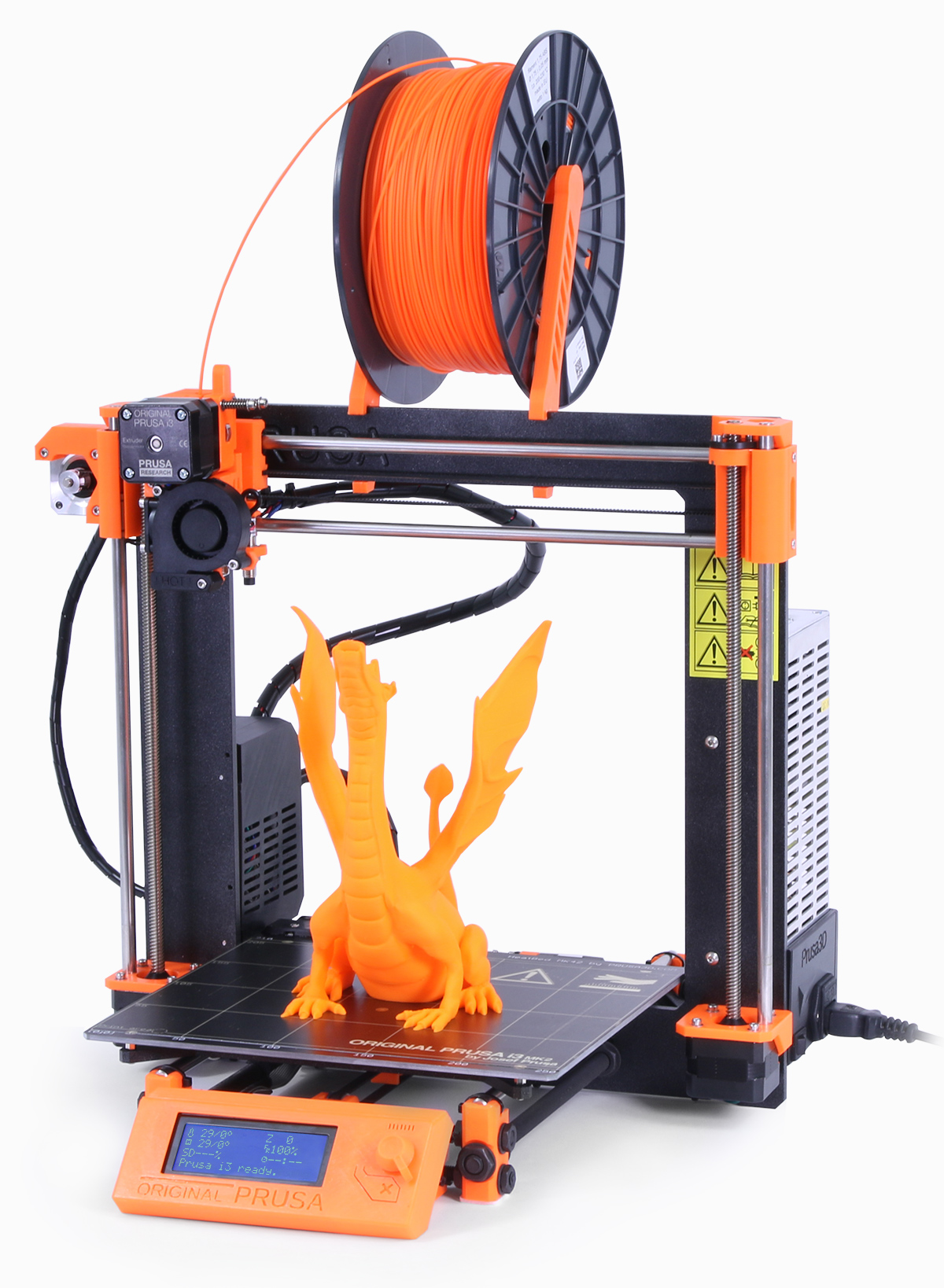
Prusa i3 MK2

Průša released the Prusa i3 MK2 in May 2016. It was the first hobby 3D printer with mesh bed leveling and automatic geometry skew correction for all three axes. Features included a larger build volume, custom stepper motors with integrated lead screws, a non-contact inductive sensor for auto-leveling, and a rewritten version of the Marlin firmware. Other new features include a polyetherimide print surface, Rambo controller board and an E3D V6 Full hotend. The Prusa MK2 became the first RepRap printer to be supported by Windows 10 Plug-and-Play USB ID.

In March 2017, Průša announced on his blog that the revised Prusa i3 MK2S would ship in place of the Prusa i3 MK2. Enhancements cited include U-bolts to hold the LM8UU bearings where cable ties had been used, higher quality bearings and rods, an improved mount for the inductance sensor, improved cable management, and a new electronics cover. An upgrade kit was offered to owners of the MK2 to add these improvements.

=== Prusa i3 MK3 and MK2.5 ===
In September 2017, Prusa i3 MK3 was released, marketed as "bloody smart." Starting with this model, the base and Y axis were assembled with aluminum extrusion, eliminating the last of the structural threaded rods from the Mendel design. Included were a new extruder with dual Bondtech drive-gears, quieter fans with RPM monitoring, faster print speeds, an updated bed leveling sensor, a new electronics board named "Einsy", quieter stepper motors with 128 step microstepping drivers and a magnetic heatbed with interchangeable PEI-coated steel sheets. Electrical components were updated to work with the new 24 volt power supply. The printer also offers dedicated sockets to connect Raspberry Pi Zero W running a fork of the open source OctoPrint software for wireless printing.

Ease-of-use features included a filament detector, allowing the printer to load filament when it is inserted, and to pause printing if the filament is jammed or runs out; error-correcting stepper motor drivers preventing layer shifts due to skipped steps; and recovery after power outages. The ambient temperature sensor both confirms suitable environment temperature and detects overheated electrical connections on the main board.

Existing MK2 and MK2S users were offered a $199 partial upgrade named MK2.5, limited to features which are cheaper to upgrade. After negative feedback from the community, Prusa made available a more expensive $500 MK2S to MK3 full upgrade.

=== Prusa i3 MK3S and MK3S+ ===
In February 2019, Prusa i3 MK3S was released, along with the Multi Material Upgrade 2S (MMU2S), which allows selecting any of 5 different materials for printing together automatically. MK3S changes include a simplified opto-mechanical filament sensor, improved print cooling, and easier access to service the extruder.

Prusa made a running change starting November, 2020 to the Prusa i3 MK3S+. This model has a revised bed leveling sensor and minor parts changes.

=== Prusa MK4 and MK4S ===
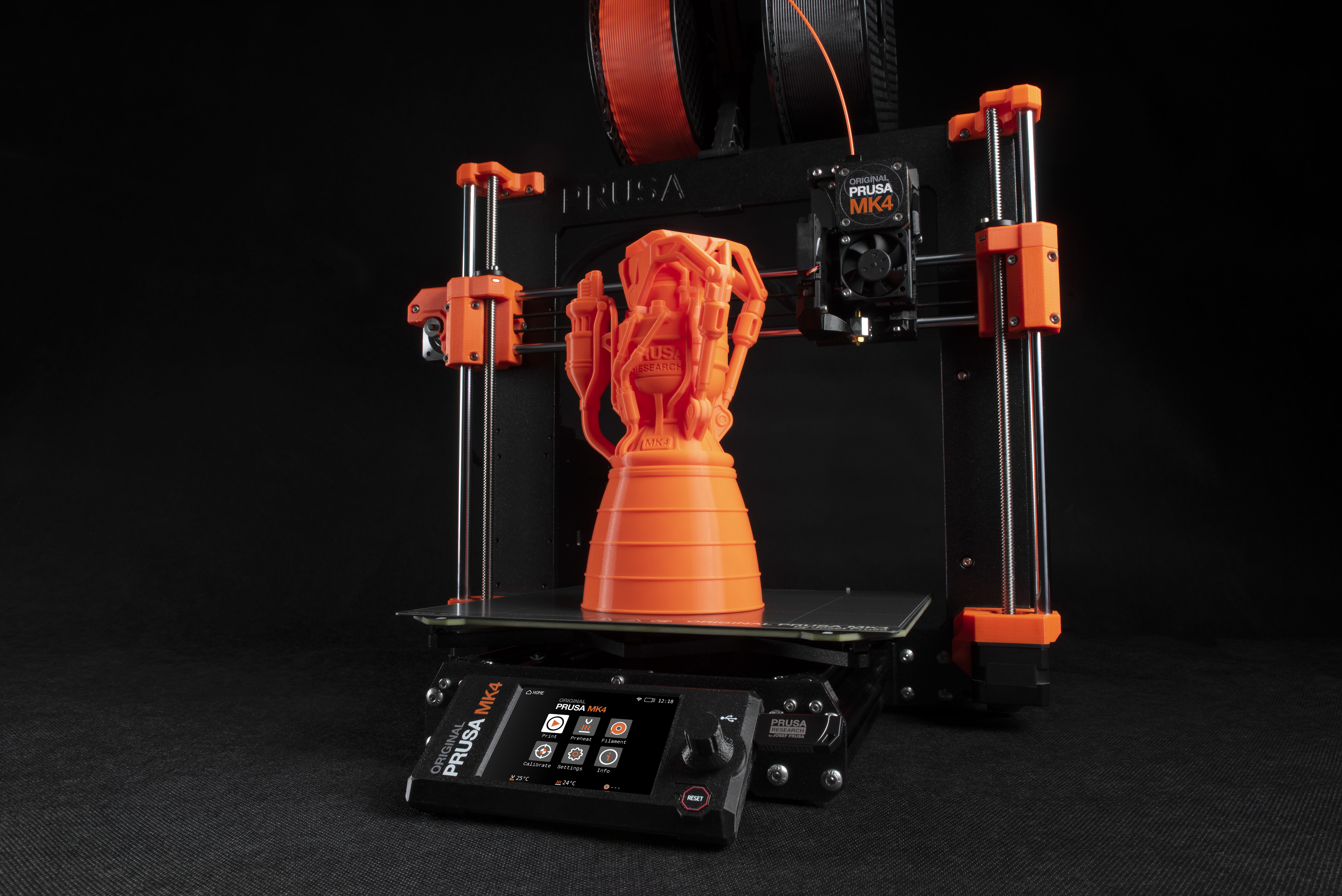
Original Prusa MK4

In March 2023 the company announced the Prusa MK4 and the Multi Material Unit version 3 (MMU3). This model features a new version of their "Nextruder" extruder system first seen on the Prusa XL, no-adjustment load cell bed leveling, a modular replaceable all-metal hot end, a color touchscreen, and die-cast aluminum frame, Y-carriage (heat bed support), and extruder frame. The 32-bit main processor board includes additional safety and monitoring circuits, a network connector, a port for the MMU3, and a Wi-fi module. This is Prusa's first Mendel-based design to include support for local and cloud monitoring and support.

Switching to 0.9 degree stepping motors, and the addition of input shaping and pressure advance, allow the Mendel-style design to print faster while avoiding ringing artifacts and other undesirable patterns imposed on the object being made, even though it does not have the advantages of the box-like structure of CoreXY printers. However, Průša has stated that print quality, not maximum speed, is their design goal. There is a provision for an accelerometer, often used in 3D printing for self-tuning of input shaping, but that component is not included in the final design.

When announced, software for input shaping, and sensor data collection were not finished, and the Multi Material Unit was not ready for release. Upgrade kits for earlier models likewise were not available for shipping. On February 5, 2024, upgrade kits to MK3.5 for the MK3 began shipping. Touch screen operation was not formally enabled until April 2024.

In August 2024 Prusa released the Prusa MK4S along with upgrade kits for owners of previous Prusa i3 printers. The MK4S brought marginal improvement over the previous MK4, with improved part cooling, faster print speeds, and more. Upon release of the CORE One, a Core-XY printer, the company released an upgrade path from the MK4S.

=== Prusa CORE One ===
In November 2024 Prusa released the Prusa CORE One printer with an enclosed chamber (with temperature control), a new LCD screen and faster print speeds (compared to the MK4S). Upgrade kits for the previous model MK4S, to the CORE One were also released. At the end of May 2025, the multi material kit addon (MMU3), for the CORE One was released by Prusa.

== Other Prusa models ==
Following the MK3S, Prusa introduced other models such as the Prusa SL1 (SLA printer), the Prusa Mini (with a cantilever arm), Prusa XL (using a CoreXY method inside a full-frame structure) and Prusa Core One, also using a CoreXY framework. These printers are not iterations of the Mendel frame design (except Prusa Core One, which is).

== Variants ==
With all aspects of the design freely available under open source and open hardware terms, companies and individuals around the world have produced Prusa i3 copies, variants, and upgrades in assembled and kit form, with thousands offered for sale as early as 2015. Rather than compete directly with these, Prusa Research's strategy is to pursue continual refinement of its designs.

== Recognition ==
- In 2012, Josef Průša received honors from the governor of the Vysočina Region in the Czech Republic for his accomplishments in technology.
- In February 2014 he was featured on the cover of Czech Forbes magazine as one of the 30 under 30 list.
- The MK2 and MK2S printers both won Best Overall 3D Printer awards from Make: Magazine.
- Deloitte placed Prusa Research at the top of the 2018 Deloitte Technology Fast 50 as the fastest growing company in Central Europe.
- The 3D Hubs Q3 2018 Trends report noted that the Prusa i3 MK2, MK2S and MK3 had been used to manufacture nearly 35% of all prints ordered through their fee-for-service business.
- The MK3 was named FFF 3D printer of the year for 2019 by 3D Printing Industry.
- Průša was again featured on the cover of the Czech edition of Forbes in 2019 for his leadership at the now billion-koruna company.
- All3DP named the MK3 the Best 3D Printer of 2018, and the MK3S the Best 3D Printer of 2020.
- The MK3S and MK3S+ were identified as "Our pick" or "Upgrade pick" by Wirecutter from 2020 until supplanted by Bambu Labs products late in 2023.

== Components and materials ==
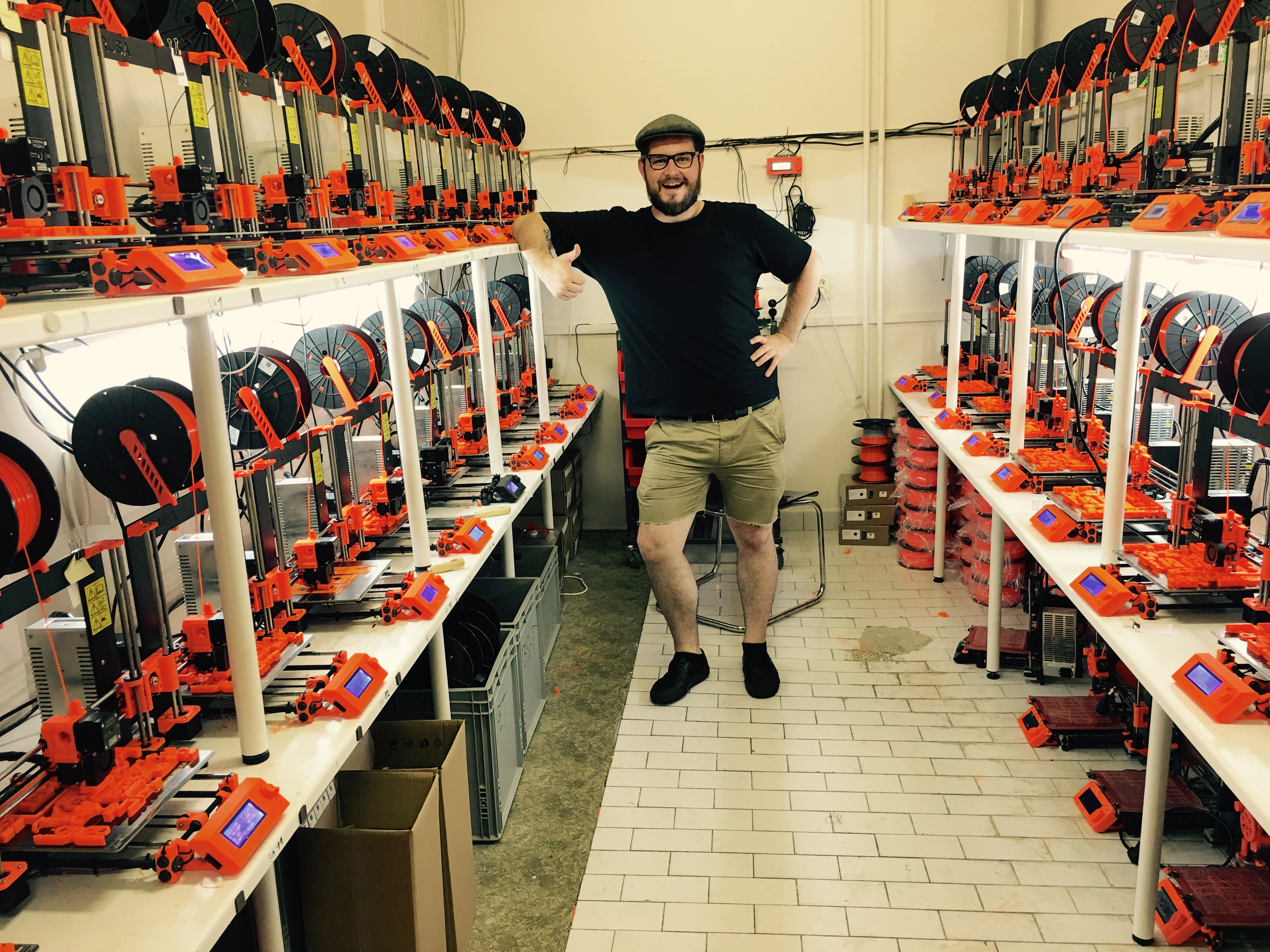
Josef Průša inside an early Prusa i3 MK2 print farm producing 3D printed parts at Prusa Research in Prague, Czech Republic.

=== Plastic parts ===
All Prusa i3 models use 3D printing filament as feedstock to make parts.

Like other RepRap printers the Prusa i3 is capable of creating many of its own parts, with the designs freely available for repairs, replication, and redesign. Formerly these were printed in ABS plastic; Prusa Research later switched to mostly PETG printed parts, with ASA used for higher temperatures near the nozzle. As of 2024 Prusa uses PETG with PCCF, a high-temperature polycarbonate blend with carbon fibers, on several printers including the MK4/MK4S. Prusa maintains a "print farm" of 600 3D printers (as of October 2021) to manufacture the plastic parts for Original Prusa branded products, with select injection molded parts added to speed production.

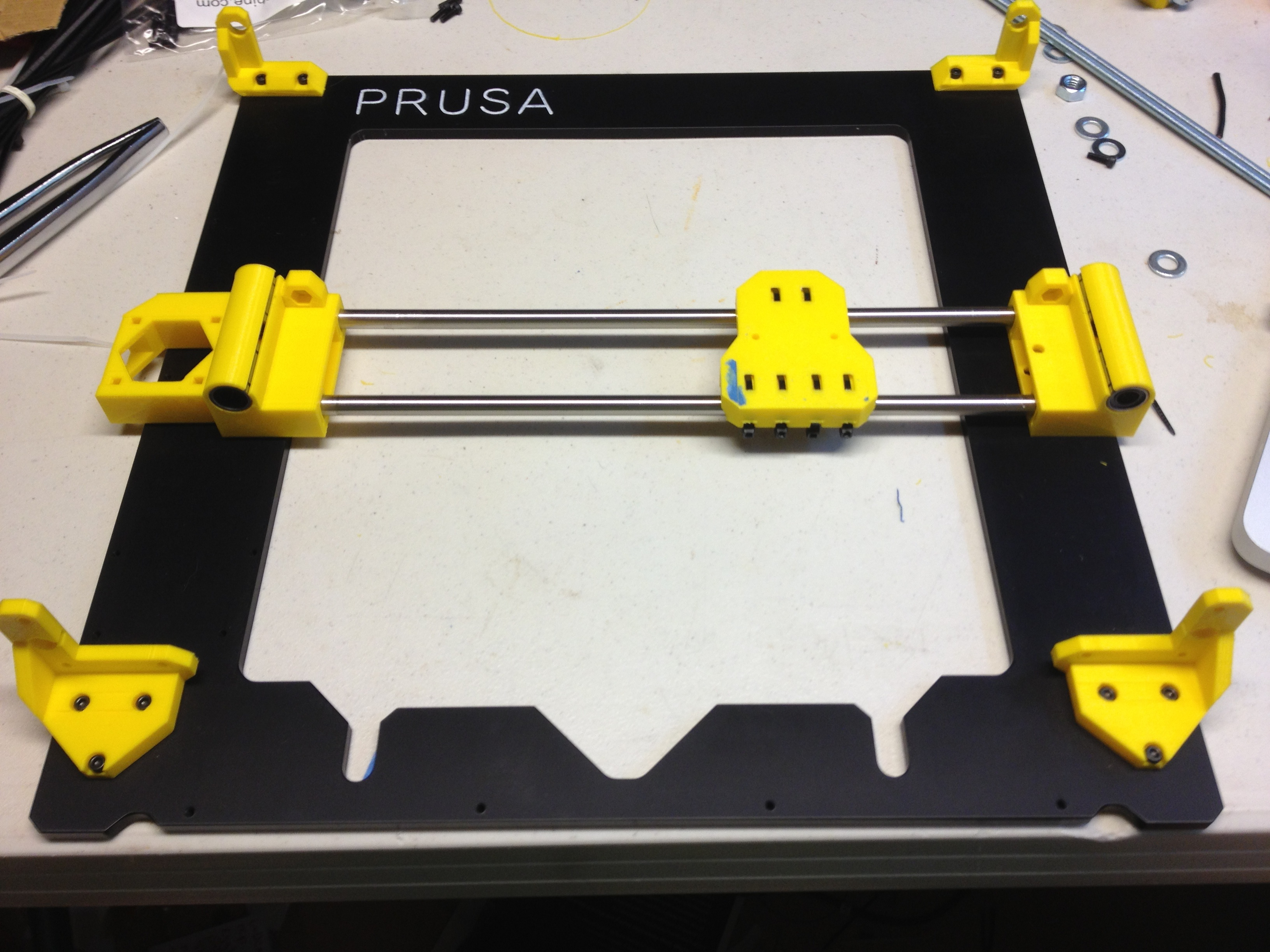
Metal frame and constructed X axis, printed parts in yellow.

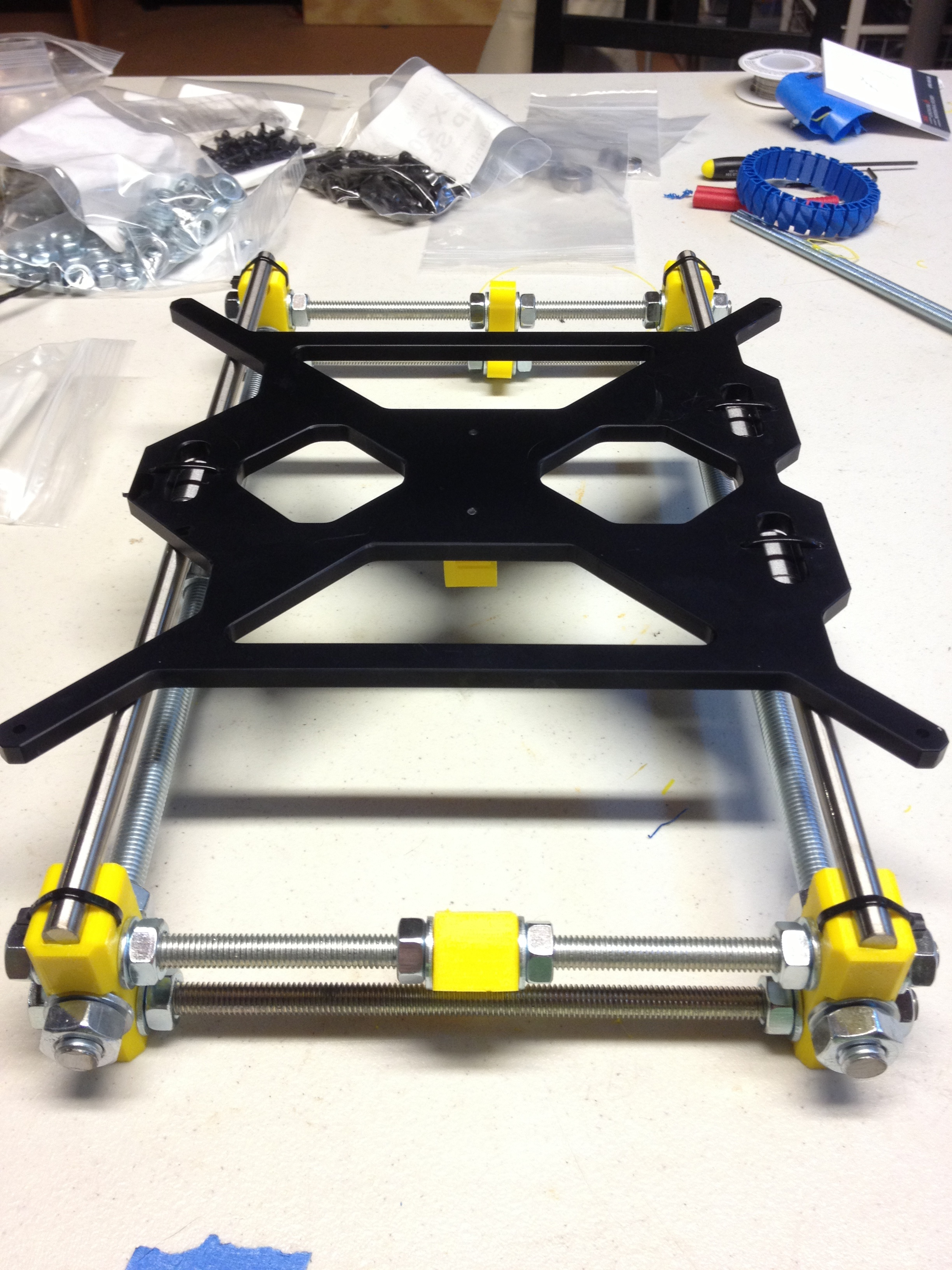
Assembled Y axis, printed parts in yellow.

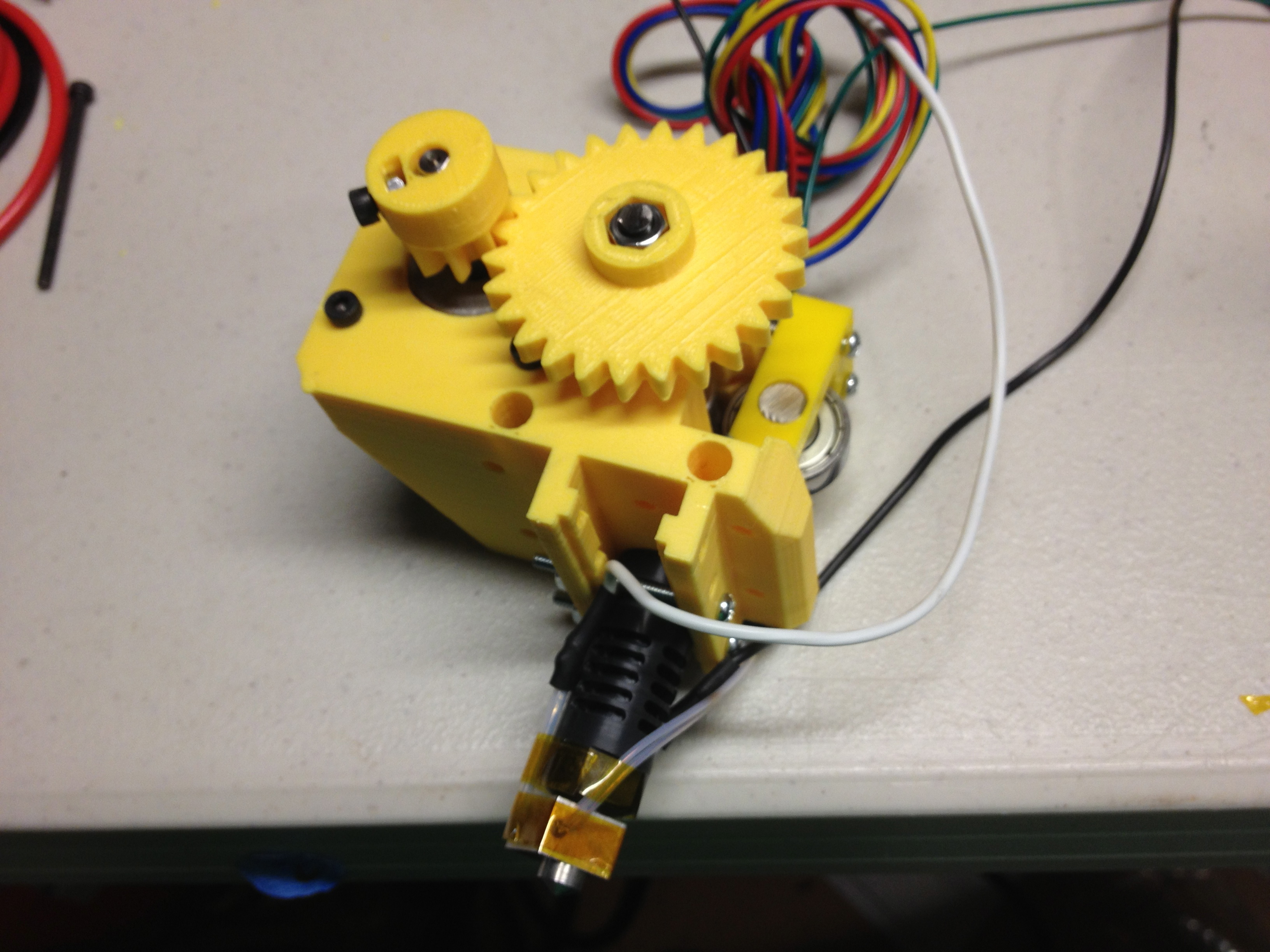
The original Prusa i3 MK0 extruder and hot end with yellow printed parts.

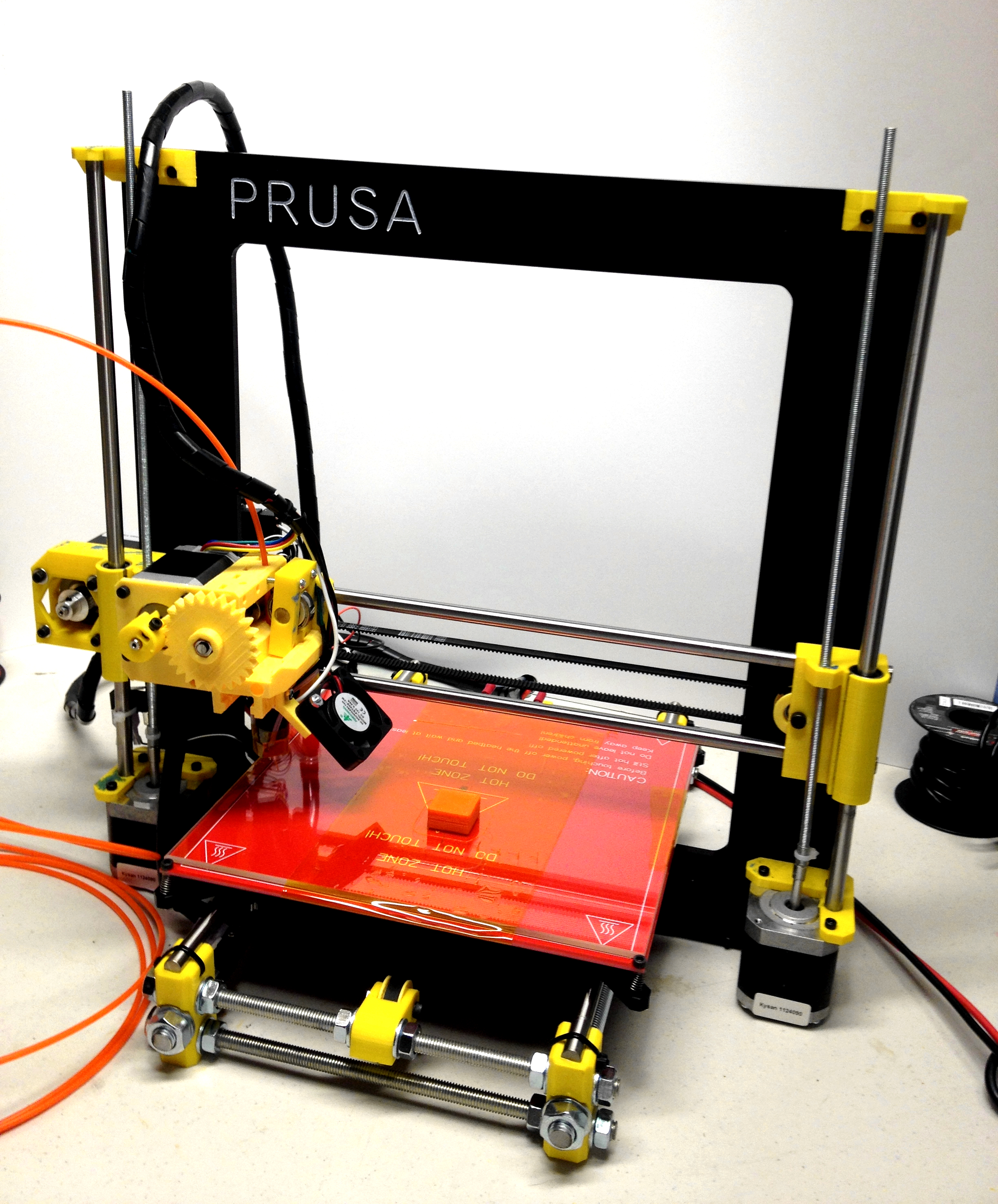
Completed Prusa i3, printed parts in yellow.

=== Control system ===
When the Prusa i3 design was first introduced in 2012, RepRap printers frequently used Open Hardware controllers such as an Arduino Mega combined with an Arduino shield providing the remaining circuitry, such as the RAMPS board. All-in-one versions such as the RAMBo board were becoming available. As a commercial product, Original Prusa i3 up to MK2 used Mini-Rambo. MK3 versions switched to Einsy Rambo boards to provide desired features such as quieter operation. The MK4 uses xBuddy, the first 32-bit board used in the i3 series.

All Original Prusa products use Marlin 3D printing firmware.

=== First layer control and bed leveling ===
When extruding the first layer, the print head must be a precise distance away from the print bed for proper adhesion. Many 3D printers rely on the user to complete this process by adjusting the height of the bed at several locations ("bed leveling"). To automate this process, Prusa i3 models from the MK2 in 2016 have sensor called PINDA (Prusa INDuction Autoleveling) to detect the height of the printbed at different locations, and then adjust for it when printing ("auto-leveling").

- PINDA V1 - A non-contact inductive sensor used on MK2/S and MINI.
- PINDA V2 - A thermally compensated inductive sensor used on MK2.5, MK2.5S, MK3, and MK3S.
- SuperPINDA - A thermally insensitive sensor used with MK2.5/S, and MK3/S/+.
- Load cell sensor - A contact sensor used on the MK4.

The PINDA series requires an electronic Z-height adjustment that may vary for different heat bed surfaces or different nozzles. The load cell sensor automatically compensates for variations in nozzle size, and thickness and expansion of the heated bed surface, eliminating stored settings for the purpose.

=== Frames ===
The distinguishing feature of the i3 from its predecessors is the vertical frame, which can take many forms. These include single sheet frames cut from steel or acrylic, box frames from plywood or medium-density fibreboard, and Lego. Inexpensive aluminum extrusion is commonly used, both by printer enthusiasts and by manufacturers of "clone" i3 printers. Some mass market i3 derivatives, such as the Creality Ender 3, use rollers against the extruded frame itself instead of precision rods and bearings to reduce cost and complexity.

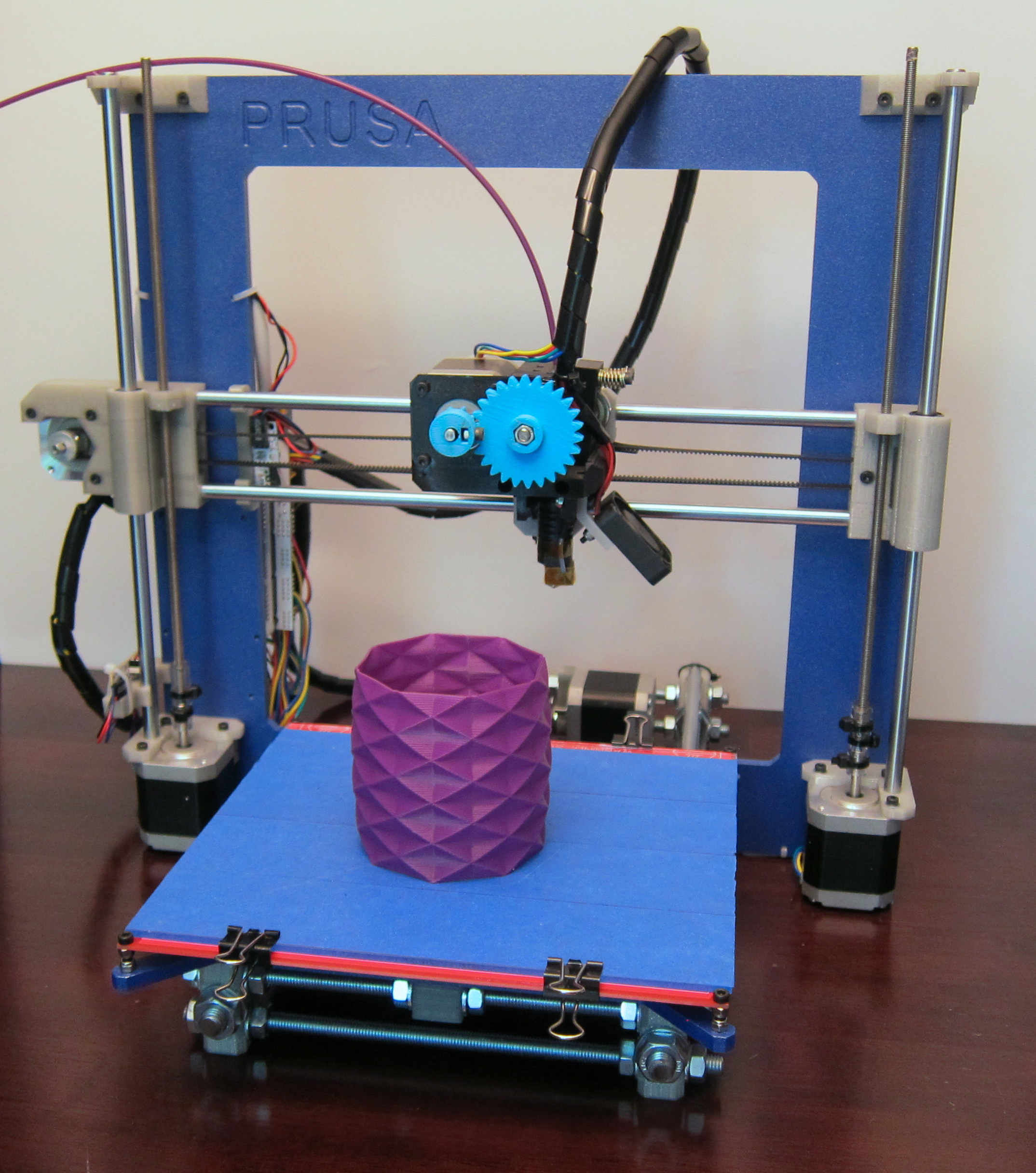
A Prusa i3 with a standard metal frame.

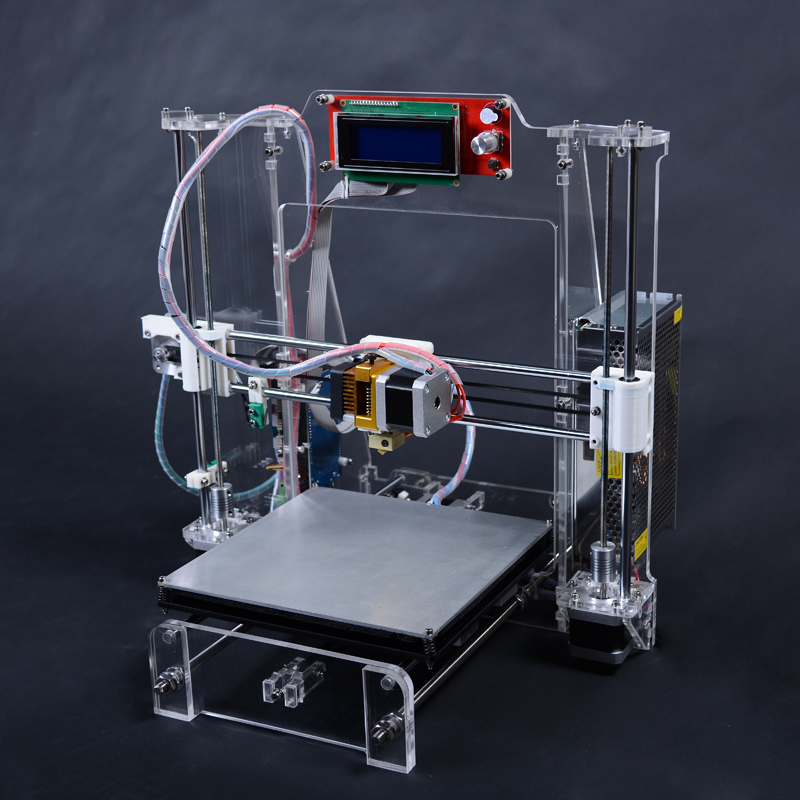
A Prusa i3 with an acrylic frame.

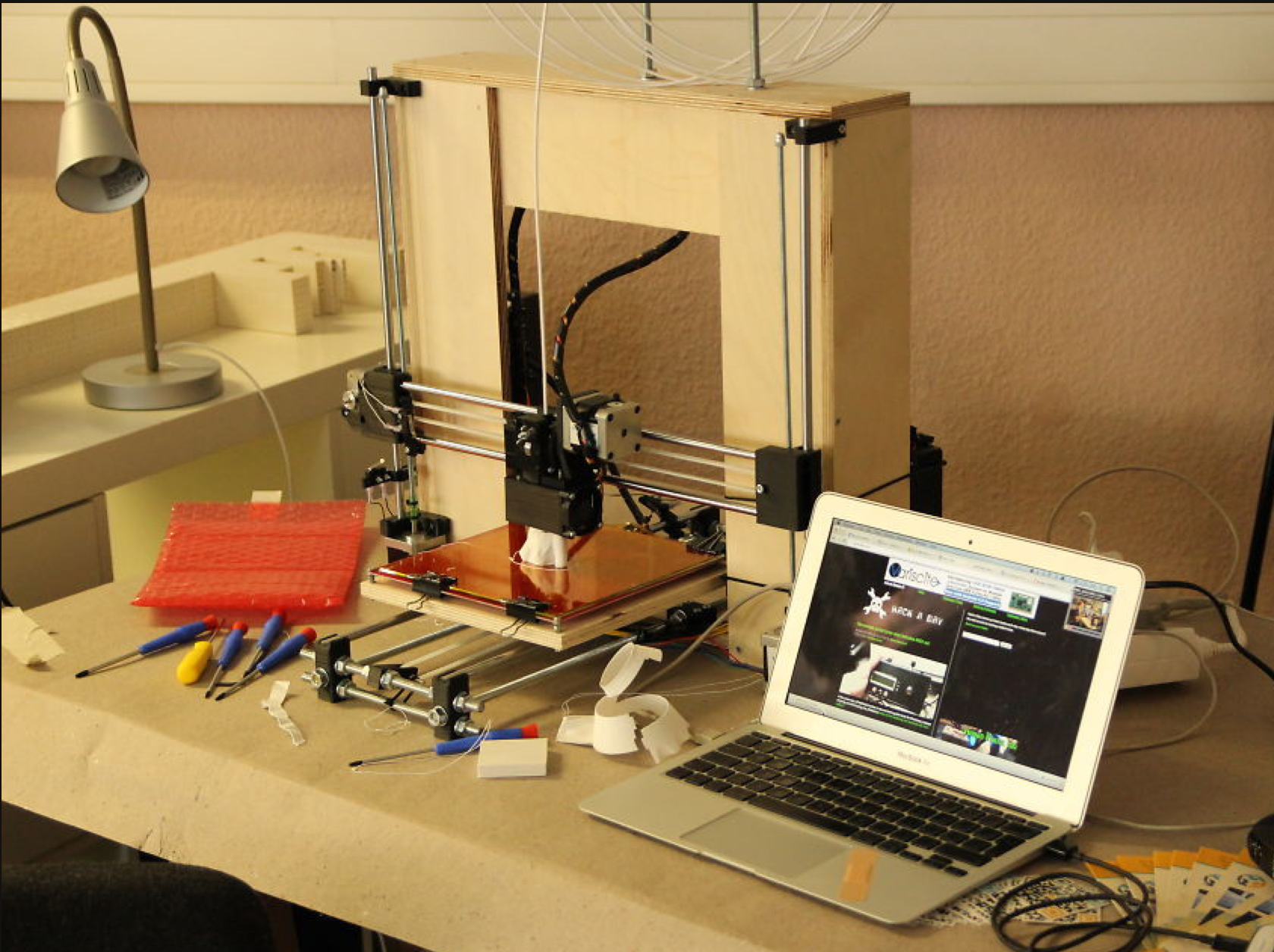
A Prusa i3 with a plywood box frame.

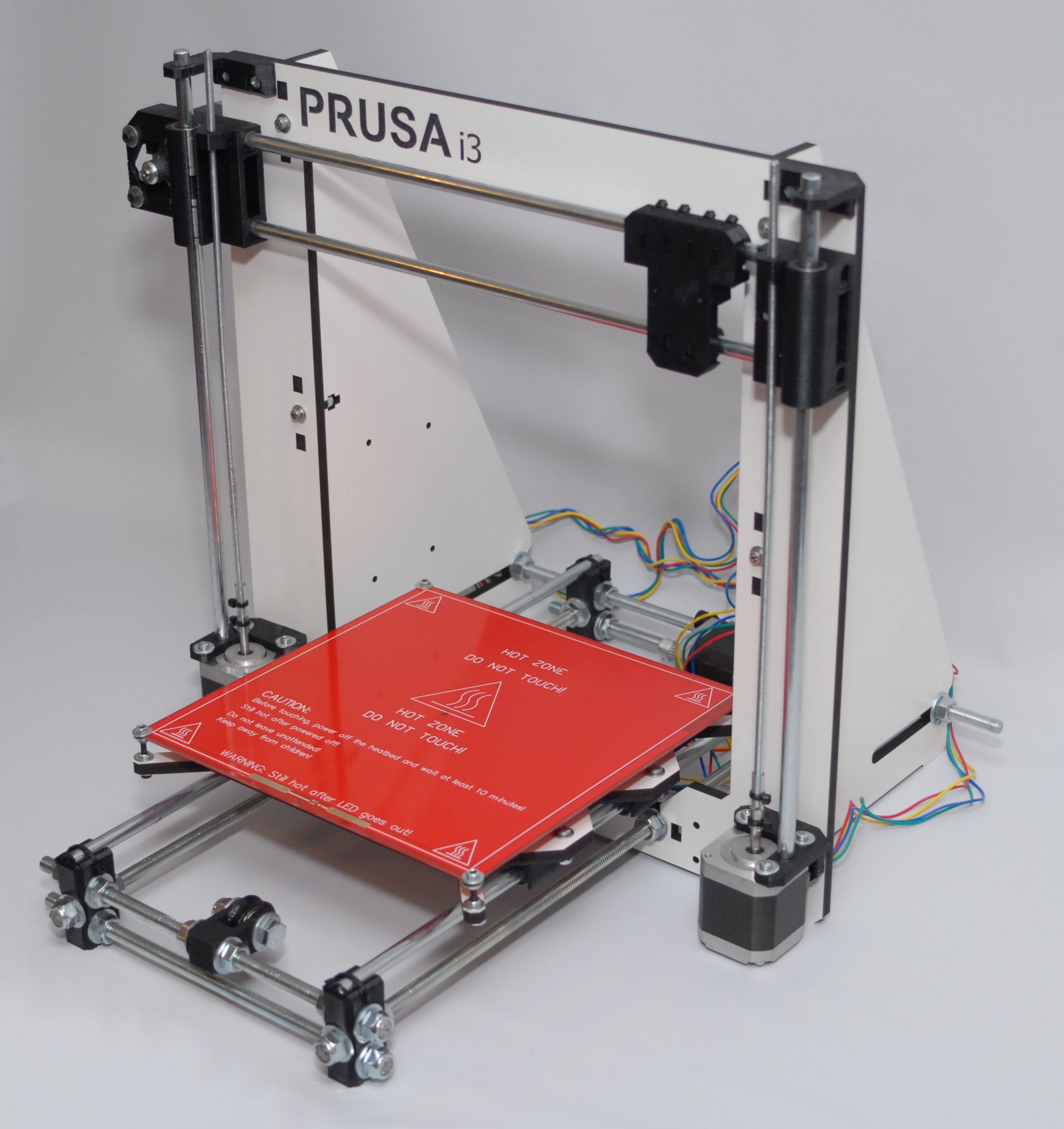
A Prusa i3 with a melamine-resin particle board frame.

=== Extruders ===
Beyond the standard Prusa i3 filament extruders, others have created aftermarket extruders and enthusiast tool heads, including a MIG welder and a laser cutter. Prusa offered a collection of functional cooking tools and programs under the name "MK3 Master Chef Upgrade" as an April Fools' Day gag in 2018.

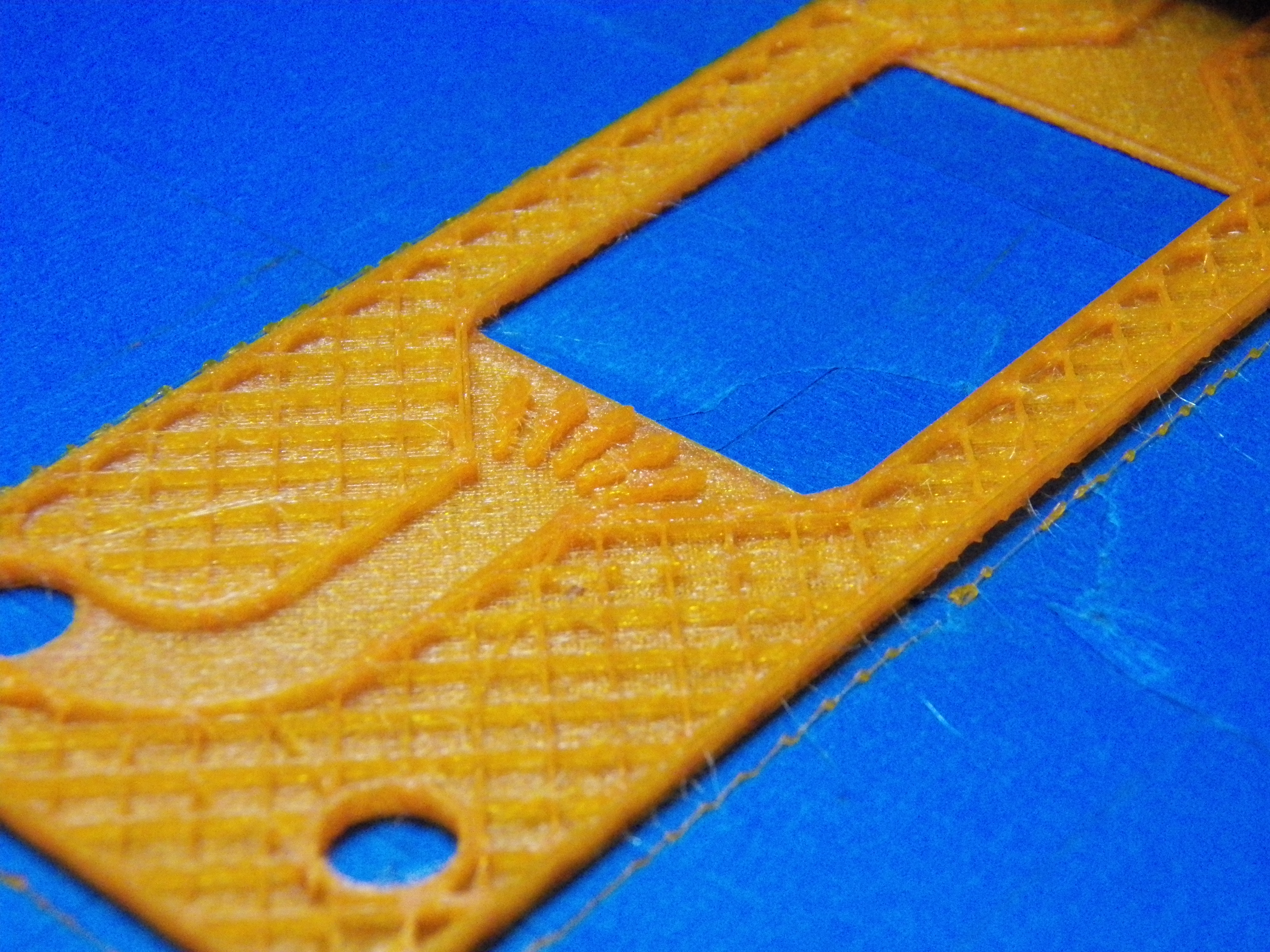
A partially printed single-colour object showing the infill created to increase rigidity and reduce the amount of plastic used.

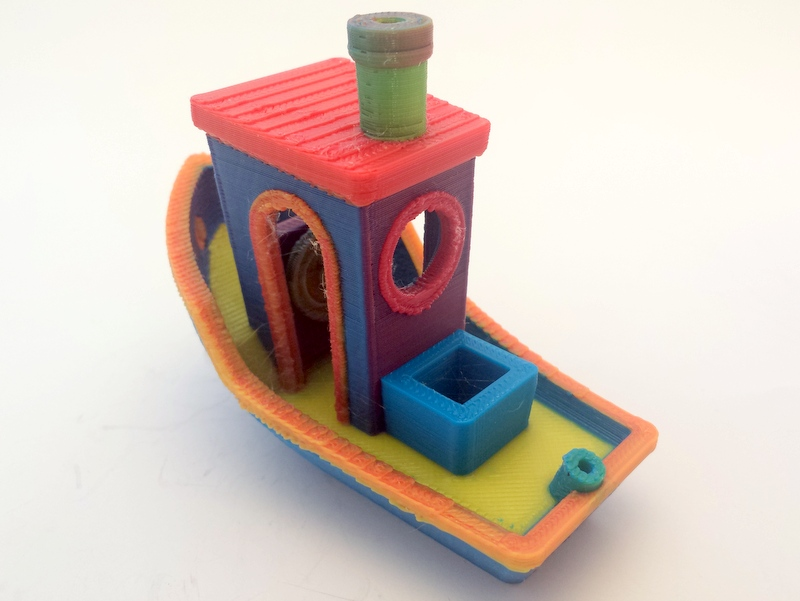
A 3DBenchy created on a Prusa i3 using a color-mixing hot end.

== See also ==
- Prusa Mini
