= Zdeněk Mraček =

Czech doctor and politician (1930–2022)

Mayor of Plzeň
- In office 5 December 1990 – 5 December 1994
- Preceded by: Stanislav Loukota
- Succeeded by: Zdeněk Prosek

Personal details
- Born: 6 January 1930 Plzeň, Czechoslovakia
- Died: 17 August 2022 (aged 92)
- Party: ODA
- Education: Charles University
- Occupation: Doctor

Zdeněk Mraček (6 January 1930 – 17 August 2022) was a Czech politician. A member of the Civic Democratic Alliance, he served as mayor of Plzeň from 1990 to 1994.

Mraček died on 17 August 2022, at the age of 92.
