= Josef Průša =

Czech businessman (born 1990)

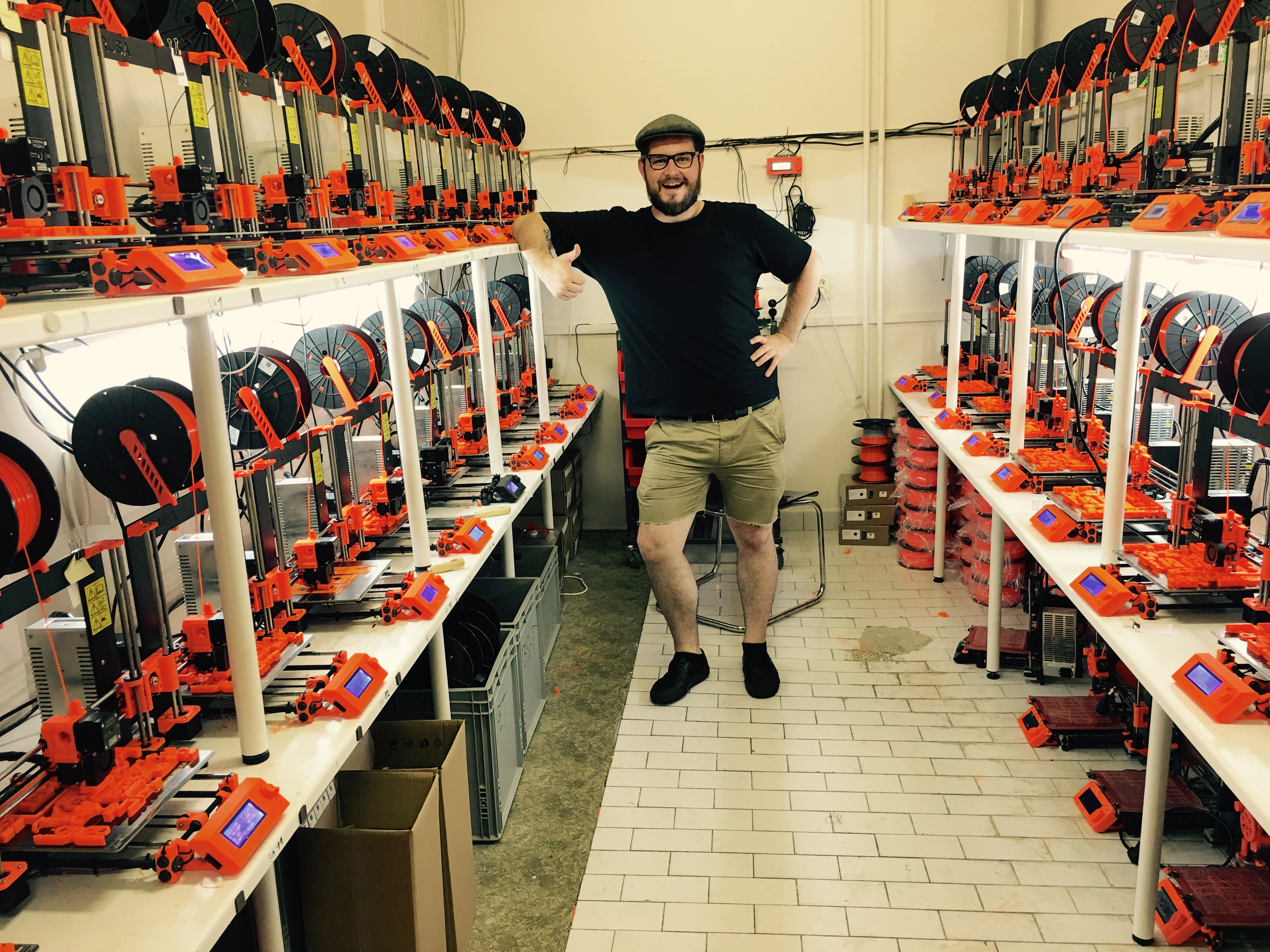
- Born: February 23, 1990 (age 36); Havlíčkův Brod, Czech Republic
- Education: Prague University of Economics and Business
- Occupation: Entrepreneur
- Known for: 3D printer developer

Josef Průša (born 23 February 1990) is a Czech businessman and 3D printer developer. He is the owner of Prusa Research.

== Early life and education ==
Josef Průša was born on 23 February 1990 in Havlíčkův Brod, Czechoslovakia. He studied applied computer science at the University of Economics in Prague, but did not complete it.

== Career ==
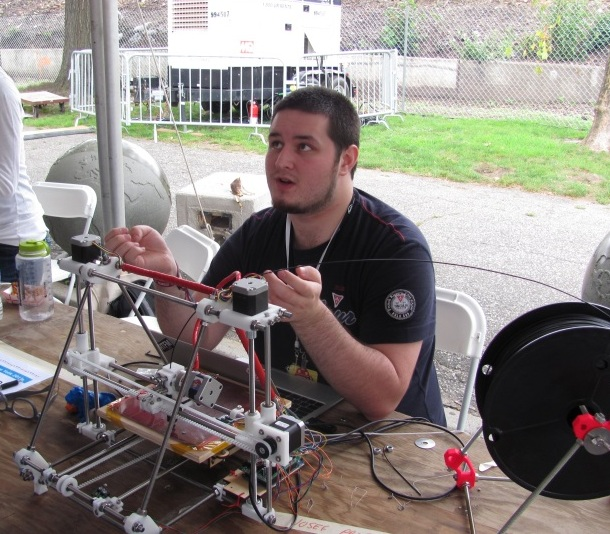
Josef Průša with a Prusa Mendel i1 (2011)

At the age of 19 he began designing 3D printers, and in 2012 he founded Prusa Research, which is a company that has made many notable 3D printers such as the Prusa XL, the Prusa MK3 and the Prusa Core One. The foundation for his business was his collaboration with the RepRap project, a 3D printer project that can partially replicate itself and is available as open-source hardware.

He has lectured on 3D printing and open-source hardware. He also has taught Arduino at the Faculty of Arts, Charles University, and taught at the Academy of Arts, Architecture and Design in Prague.

== Recognition ==
In 2012, he received the Wooden Medal of the Vysočina Region.

He was named EY Emerging Entrepreneur of the Year in 2016. In 2021, he was awarded the Honorary Recognition Award by Mensa Czech Republic, selected over other nominees Jiří Březina, Jan Frolík, Petr Horálek, and Libuša Hozová.

In 2021, Forbes ranked him as the 75th richest Czech with assets of 4.3 billion Czech koruna.

In October 2025, he received Medal of Merit for his economic achievements by President Petr Pavel.

== See also ==
- Prusa i3
- RepRap
