= Kit houses in Michigan =

Type of house construction

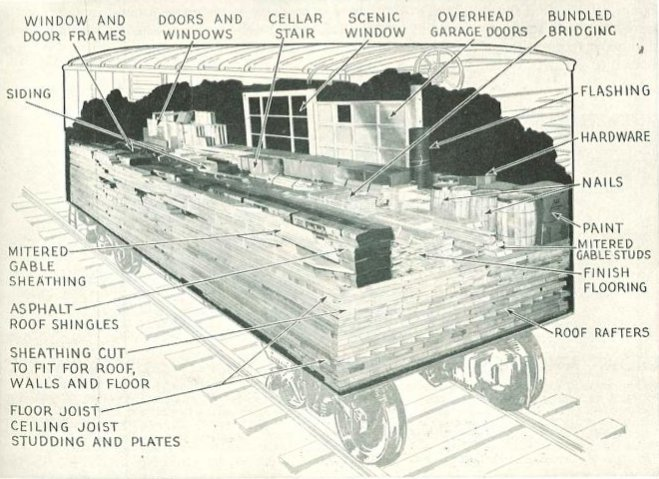
Excerpt from an Aladdin Company brochure demonstrating how a kit house could be shipped from their Bay City headquarters in a single railway box car (1952).

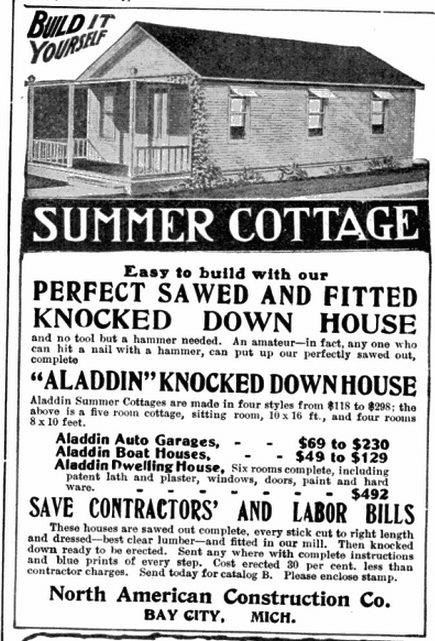
Aladdin advert in Popular Mechanics, 1908

Kit houses in Michigan were a type of housing that was largely developed in the US state of Michigan throughout the first half of the 20th century. Michigan was home to the Aladdin Company, the first and longest-lived manufacturer of kit houses in North America, who had sales "in every part of the world, from Saskatchewan to Tahiti". Lewis and Sterling, two other major manufacturers of kit houses, were also based in Michigan.

Starting with Aladdin's simple knock-down models, these kit houses quickly evolved into full-size homes that were based on the architectural styles of the period. Unlike pre-fabricated homes, these homes were shipped in thousands of individual parts that had to be constructed on-site. The introduction of pre-cut lumber pieces helped to expedite the construction process. Shipping pre-cut home parts across the United States, these companies turned Michigan into the "center of kit-home manufacturing". Examples of the homes manufactured by these companies and other kit house manufacturers like Sears, Gordon-Van Tine and Wardway can be found in communities across the state of Michigan. These include clusters of homes and rare models that are notable in the history of kit houses, the oldest of which are now over 100 years old.

== History ==
Among the first kit house companies was the Aladdin Company, based in Bay City, which started producing kit houses and other domestic buildings in 1906. Aladdin sold large orders of kit houses to companies in the extraction and manufacturing fields who used them to create neighborhoods of kit houses for employees of those companies. By 1918, 2.4% of all US housing starts could be credited to homes purchased from Aladdin.

The lumber for early Aladdin homes was provided by the Lewis company of Bay City. In 1913, Lewis began to produce their own line of kit houses. In 1915, the International Mill & Timber Company of Bay City began selling kit houses under the Sterling brand. The presence of three major manufacturers of kit houses was due in part to Bay City's history in relation to the timber industry. This capacity to process large amounts of timber allowed these companies to easily supply the volume of lumber necessary for kit houses.

Unlike other kit house manufacturers that went out of the kit home business due to the Great Depression or the advent of World War II, all three Michigan-based companies continued to manufacture kit houses for a number of decades, with Lewis and Sterling closing in the 1970s and Aladdin being the last to close in 1982. Several smaller companies including the McClure Company of Saginaw also produced kit houses that were sold around the country.

== Examples ==
Aladdin, Lewis and Sterling were all based in Bay City and the city's neighborhoods feature many kit houses from all three companies. These include some of the largest kit house models from these companies that were built for executives of the kit house manufacturers. Other communities that have notable collections of existing kit houses include Ann Arbor, Berkley, Clawson, Detroit, Pontiac, Waterford, Flint, and Ypsilanti.

Michigan manufacturers and their competitors produced "streets lined with houses" in Ypsilanti, outside of the architectural norms set out in Marcus Whiffen's quintessential American Architecture Since 1780. Later identified by comparison with their original manufacturers' catalogs, a number of homes have been chronicled by the Washtenaw Historical Society and Ypsilanti Historical Society and have been the subject of National Register of Historic Places nominations. A number of kit houses in Michigan were featured in the sales catalogs of the various kit house manufacturers, and many of these "testimonial" homes still stand today. While most kit homes are privately owned, a couple are publicly accessible. These include:

- Berkley: Roseland Park Cemetery - Aladdin Pomona
- Waterford: Hatchery House - Sterling Senator B
