= Kit house =

Premade housing materials in the US and Canada

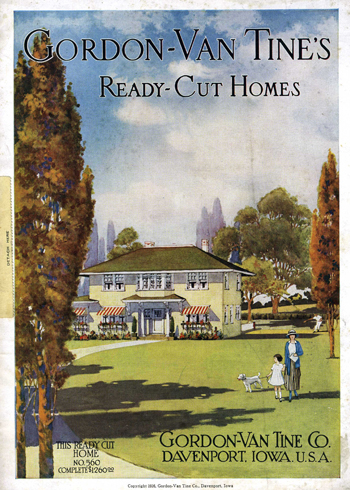
Cover of the 1916 catalog of Gordon-Van Tine kit house plans

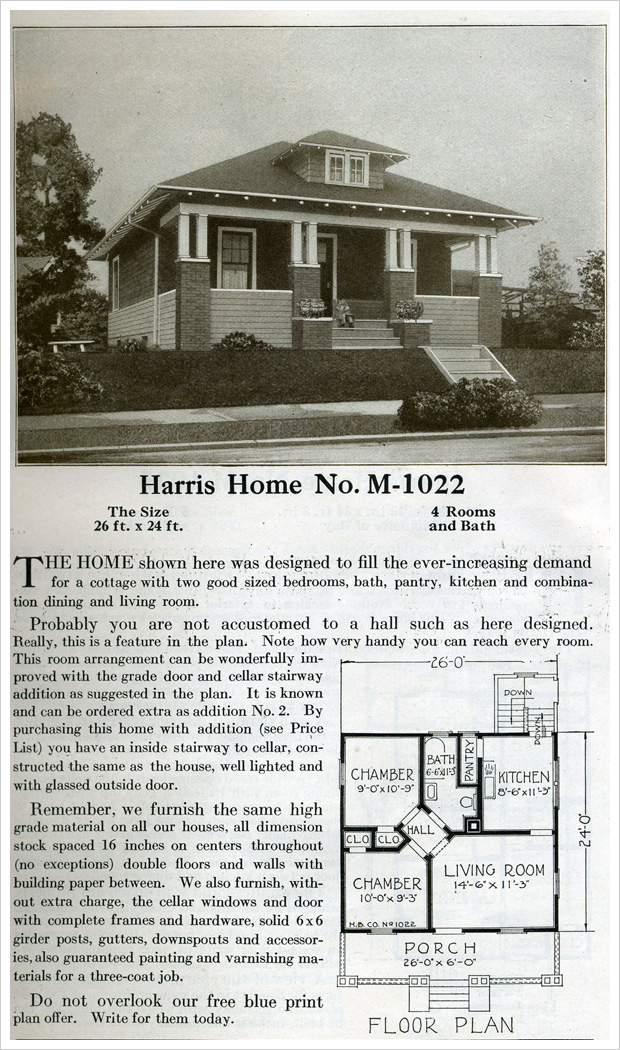
A modest bungalow-style kit house plan offered by Harris Homes in 1920

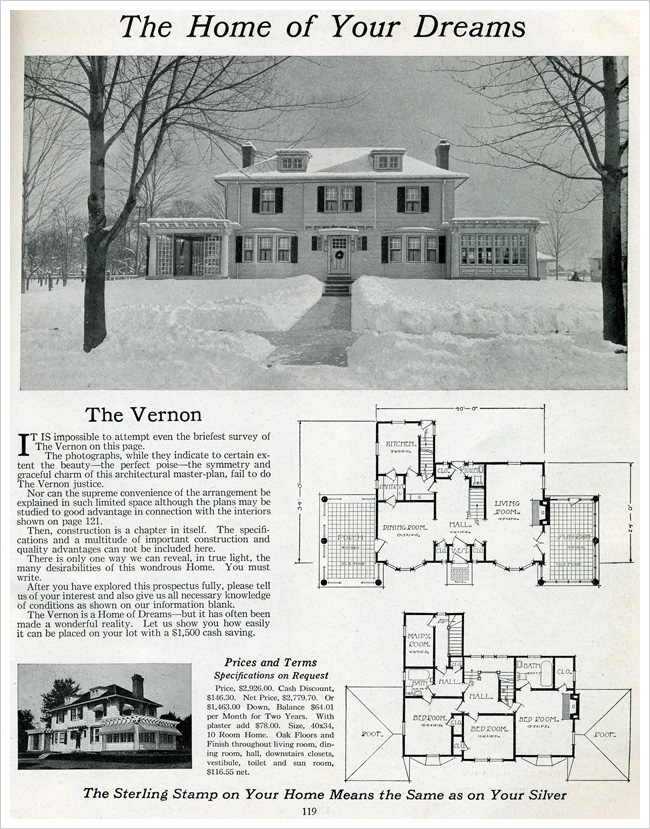
A Colonial Revival kit home offered by Sterling Homes in 1916

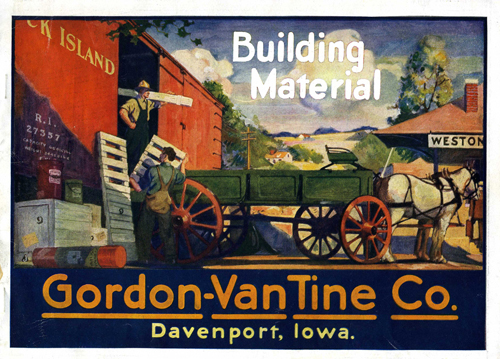
Cover of a 1922 catalog published by Gordon-Van Tine, showing building materials being unloaded from a boxcar

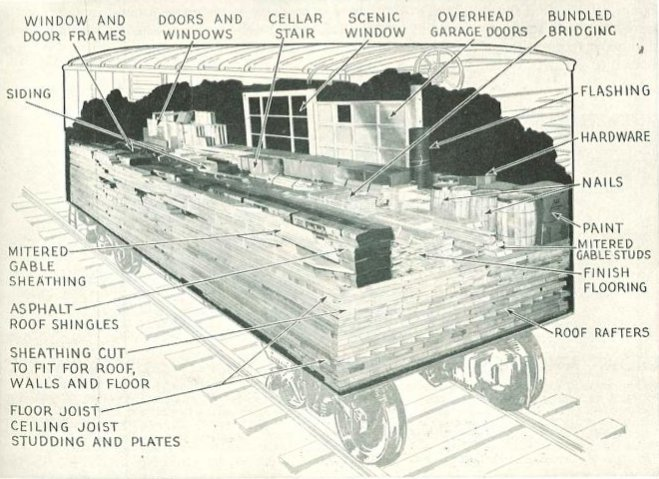
Illustration of kit home materials loaded in a boxcar from a 1952 Aladdin catalogue

Kit houses, also known as mill-cut houses, pre-cut houses, ready-cut houses, mail order homes, or catalog homes, were a type of housing that was popular in the United States, Canada, and elsewhere in the first half of the 20th century. Kit house manufacturers sold houses in many different plans and styles, from simple bungalows to imposing Colonials, and supplied at a fixed price all materials needed for construction of a particular house, but typically excluding brick, concrete, or masonry (such as would be needed for laying a foundation, which the customer would have to arrange to have done locally). Some house styles, like log cabins and geodesic dome homes, are still sometimes sold in kit form.

== Design ==
Stick-built, balloon-framed kit houses were built as permanent, not temporary structures, as the manager of the Sears, Roebuck lumber department explained to a United States Senate committee in 1919:

A ready-cut house should not be confused with a sectional-portable house, which can be taken down and moved by being unbolted. A ready-cut house is a permanent house and the method of its construction is not different from any other frame house where the lumber is framed (or cut to its proper length, notched, etc.), by hand by carpenters.

Unlike modular homes and prefabricated houses, which are built in sections at a factory, in a kit house every separate piece of framing lumber shipped was already cut to fit its particular place in the house, thus eliminating the need for measuring and cutting, and likewise the waste of time (especially in the days before power tools) and of materials. The framing lumber pieces were labeled with a letter/number combo related to the dimension of wood, and this helped the builder identify where in the house that each piece went, with these identifying labels corresponding to information shown on the blueprints for the house. Thus, kit home manufacturers claimed to save the customer as much as 30 to 40 percent over traditional building methods. This description by researcher Dale Wolicki of kit house manufacture by the Gordon-Van Tine Company was typical of other kit house companies' efforts as well:

All designs were standardized to maximize efficiency and reduce waste in materials and labor. Lumber and hardware were purchased in bulk. The factories had skilled employees and special machines to cut difficult pieces such as rafters and staircases. Lumber was pre-cut to length, guaranteed to fit, ready to nail, and labeled for easy assembly. Floor joists and bridging, sub-flooring, finished flooring, studs, rafters, sheathing, clapboards, shingles, stucco, plaster or drywall, columns, railings, doors and windows, hardware, nails, and paint for two exterior coats were included in the order. Plumbing, electrical, and heating systems were available for an additional charge. Although the lumber and hardware were standardized, the designs were not, and buyers were encouraged to personalize their order. Many models had two or three floor plans, while the exterior could be clapboards, shingles, stucco, or framed for brick. Walls, windows, and doors could be moved, added or eliminated. Porches, sun rooms, flower boxes, trellises, balconies, built-in cabinets, and a variety of door and sash patterns were available at an additional charge.

== Delivery and construction ==
Depending on the size and style of the plan, the materials needed to construct a typical house, including perhaps 10,000–30,000 pieces of lumber and other building material, would be shipped by rail, filling one or two railroad boxcars, which would be loaded at the company's mill and sent to the customer's home town, where they would be parked on a siding or in a freight yard for unloading. Once the materials arrived, a customer would arrange for a local carpenter or contractor to assemble the house on a piece of property owned by the customer; or a customer who was handy with tools might assemble all or part of the house himself in several weeks or a few months' time. Although most shipments came by rail, newspaper advertisements in the late 1920s and early 1930s showed Sears offering truck delivery to buyers living within a 35 mile radius of their Newark, New Jersey plant, or their Norwood, Ohio Sash & Door company.

The resulting houses were indistinguishable in quality and appearance from those built by traditional methods, if not better, yet were often significantly cheaper to build because of the savings on carpenters' and contractors' wages; and the cost of high-quality lumber bought from a large kit house company often was lower than at the local lumber yard. In addition, some companies, including Sears, Montgomery Ward, Gordon-Van Tine, and Harris Brothers, offered cash discounts and generous mortgage terms. For most homeowners, the complete cost of building a kit house was about double the catalog price, allowing for the construction of a foundation and labor costs. The price of land or a city lot on which to build would be another expense.

== Customization ==
In addition to their pre-cut houses, some companies also sold only the house plans (with the homebuyer purchasing all the materials locally) or non-pre-cut versions of their houses (at a lower price), leaving it up to the buyer to arrange for construction and carpentry work. Furthermore, some companies would provide reversed versions of their homes or make other modifications upon request. For example,

Sears was ... a very able follower of popular home designs but with the added advantage of modifying houses and hardware according to buyer tastes. Individuals could even design their own homes and submit the blueprints to Sears, which would then ship off the appropriate precut and fitted materials, putting the home owner in full creative control.

In addition, with some companies, homebuyers could choose the quality of materials. Gordon-Van Tine offered discounts for customers who chose lesser-quality siding, roofing, doors, windows, and trim. Sears offered "Honor Bilt" homes, with the finest quality materials, as well as "Standard Built" homes that were "best for warmer climates, meaning they did not retain heat very well", and "Simplex Sectionals", made from prefabricated panels that could be bolted together, intended for use as temporary structures or summer homes.

== Advertising ==
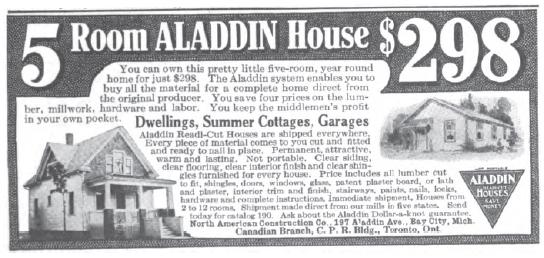
1915 magazine ad

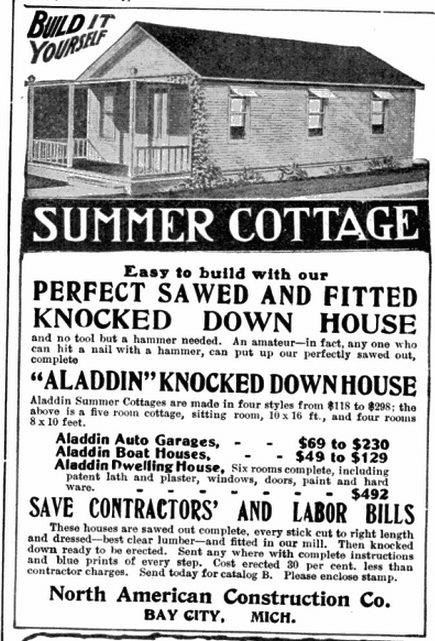
Advertisement for knocked down kits for summer cottages, in Popular Mechanics, May 1908. These were lightly constructed dwellings, not meant to be lived in year-round.

Kit houses were promoted through catalogs available at lumber yards and hardware stores, through the mail-order catalogs published by large retailers like Sears and Wards, and through advertisements in popular magazines and newspapers in those cities where kit home manufacturers had local sales offices. Dale Wolicki lists Saturday Evening Post, National Geographic, and Good Housekeeping as examples of nationwide magazines where Gordon-VanTine advertised. Prospective customers could arrange to inspect kit houses in their vicinity or visit a company's factory to tour model homes.

The ease of construction and cost savings of kit houses appealed to many would-be homeowners across the economic spectrum, from blue-collar workers to the affluent. For example, in 1928 Walt Disney and his brother Roy built two kit houses made by Pacific Ready Cut Homes on lots they owned in the Silver Lake neighborhood of Los Angeles.

The popularity of kit houses was attested in a roundabout way in the 1920 silent comedy One Week starring Buster Keaton, which shows Keaton constructing a build-it-yourself house that turns out all wrong.

== Kit house companies ==
A number of companies offered kit houses, and sometimes also offered rudimentary "industrial" and summer cottages lacking bathrooms, as well as garages, duplexes, apartment buildings, barns and other farm buildings, and even outhouses.

=== Canada ===
The largest sellers in Canada were:

- Canadian Aladdin Co. Ltd. – a branch plant, of the Michigan-based Aladdin Homes, the largest kit home seller in Canada, its Canadian headquarters were located in the Canadian Pacific Building, in Toronto. They operated across the whole of Canada, from 1905 to 1952. They were truly pre-cut, and need very little skill to assemble. They also featured high-quality lumber, and the company offered a refund of $1 for each knot found in a kit.
- The T. Eaton Co. Ltd. – by far the most important mail-order general retailer in Canada in the early twentieth century, it was also a provider of house kits from 1910 to 1932. They were only available in Western Canada, not in Ontario or the East. Eaton's sold at least 40 different house plans, but the most common type was the 1 1/2-storey, sometimes referred to as the semi-bungalow. In the 1919 and 1920 catalogues, all Eaton's houses were given a name starting in "Ea", thus, the Eatoncourt, Eastbourne, Easton, Eager, Earlswood, and Earlscourt. Although Eaton's houses were sold as kits, they were not pre-cut.
- Other smaller providers of mail-order kits included The B.C. Mills Timber and Trading Co., United Grain Growers, the University of Saskatchewan, and the Manitoba Agricultural College.

=== United States ===
Over 100,000 kit homes were built in the United States between 1908 and 1940. Companies offering kit houses during all or part of their corporate existence included:

- Aladdin Homes, Bay City, Michigan – 1906 to 1981
- Bennett Homes, North Tonawanda, New York – 1902 to 1935 or later
- Fenner Factory Cut Homes, Ready Built House Company, North Portland, Oregon – 1912 to 1928
- Gordon-Van Tine Homes, Davenport, Iowa, with additional plants in St. Louis, Missouri; Chehalis, Washington; Louisiana; and Hattiesburg, Mississippi – 1907 to 1947
- Harris Homes, Harris Brothers Company, Chicago, Illinois – 1913 to 1960
- Hewitt-Lea-Funck Company, Seattle, Washington
- Liberty Homes, Lewis Manufacturing, Bay City, Michigan – 1925 to 1973
- Pacific Ready Cut Homes, Los Angeles – 1908 to 1940
- Sears Modern Homes, Sears, Roebuck, Chicago – 1908 to 1940
- Sterling Homes, International Mill and Timber Company, Bay City, Michigan – 1915 to 1971
- Wardway Homes, Montgomery Ward, Chicago, Illinois – 1910 to 1931 (actual manufacture of homes was subcontracted to Gordon-Van Tine)

Kit house companies left the business for various economic reasons before, during, and after the Great Depression; some went bankrupt, while others returned to their original function as suppliers of building materials. According to researcher Wolicki:

Contrary to popular belief Montgomery-Ward and Sears Roebuck did not discontinue their pre-cut housing departments because of customers who defaulted on their mortgages. The New Deal programs introduced by the Roosevelt administration encouraged homeowners to refinance existing mortgages at a lower rate through programs established by the Federal Housing Administration. Throughout 1934 and 1935, customers paid off their home mortgages with Sears and Montgomery Ward. Without the profitable mortgage program Montgomery Ward decided to discontinue its offerings of pre-cut houses and building materials entirely. Sears, Roebuck continued to sell pre-cut houses but scaled back their operations significantly.

Some kit house companies continued after World War II, but most homebuyers flocked to the new, inexpensive tract house subdivisions springing up across the country. Among the kit house models manufactured after World War II were the Marshall Erdman Prefab Houses, designed by Frank Lloyd Wright in the 1950s.

Although none of the traditional kit house companies are still in business, pre-cut log home and geodesic dome kits are offered by a number of manufacturers. Lindal Homes, a kit house company established in 1945 and headquartered in Seattle, continues to sell its pre-cut exterior materials home packages internationally through a network of independent distributors. And beginning in 2006, for a few years Lowe's supplied plans and materials (not pre-cut) for small stick-built homes called Katrina Cottages, with walls designed to withstand 140 mile-per-hour (223 kilometer-per-hour) winds, intended to provide temporary housing for Gulf Coast residents who had lost their homes to Hurricane Katrina. Initially offered through Lowe's stores in Mississippi and Louisiana, in 2008 Lowe's began offering the cottages at all of its stores nationwide. However, although initially "hailed as the new Sears & Roebuck house," the program faced strong opposition from local governments in the Gulf Coast region who feared the cottages would lower property values, and by mid-2011, Lowe's had discontinued its product line.

== Other countries ==
=== Russia ===
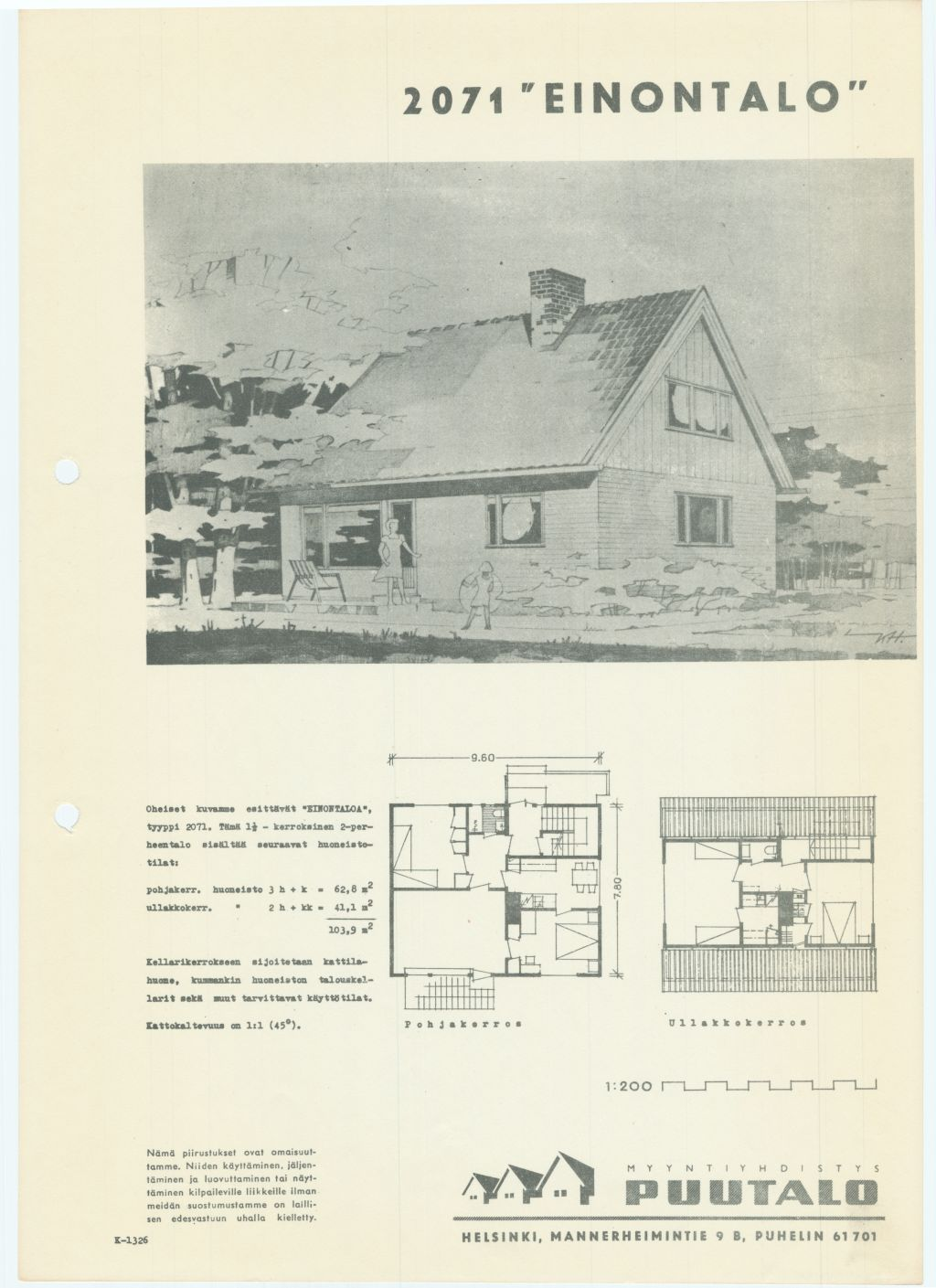
Ad for the "2071 Einontalo" manufactured by the Finnish company Puutalo during the 1950s.

Free DIY House Projects for the Development of the Far East and the Arctic, together with the VologdaTIZIS integrated design workshop, has developed 4 projects for independent construction. All information is placed in the project cards.

== Preservation ==
The Municipal District of Acadia, Alberta, has published a map of a self-guided driving tour of local catalogue houses.

== See also ==
- Gordon-Van Tine Company Historic District
- Kit houses in Michigan
- Lustron house
- Leisurama
- MAN steel house
- Sears Modern Homes

== Bibliography ==
- Schweitzer, Robert, and W. R. Davis. America's Favorite Homes: Mail-Order Catalogues as a Guide to Popular Early 20th-Century Houses. Detroit: Wayne State University Press, 1990. ISBN 0-8143-2006-6 (Google Books preview here.)
- Stevenson, Katherine Cole, and H. Ward Jandl. Houses by Mail: A Guide to Houses from Sears, Roebuck and Company. Washington, D. C.: Preservation Press, 1986. ISBN 0-471-14394-4
- Thornton, Rosemary, and Dale Wolicki. Montgomery Ward's Mail-Order Homes; A History and Field Guide to Wardway Homes. Gentle Beam Publications, 2010. ISBN 0-9715588-6-8
