= Altius =

Altius or ALTIUS may refer to:

- ALTIUS, a proposed satellite
- Altius Space Machines, an American company
- Altius Architects, a Canadian company
- Anduril Altius, an American unmanned aerial vehicle
- Sokol Altius, a Russian unmanned aerial vehicle
