= James C. Twiss House =

Historic house in Illinois, United States

- U.S. National Register of Historic Places
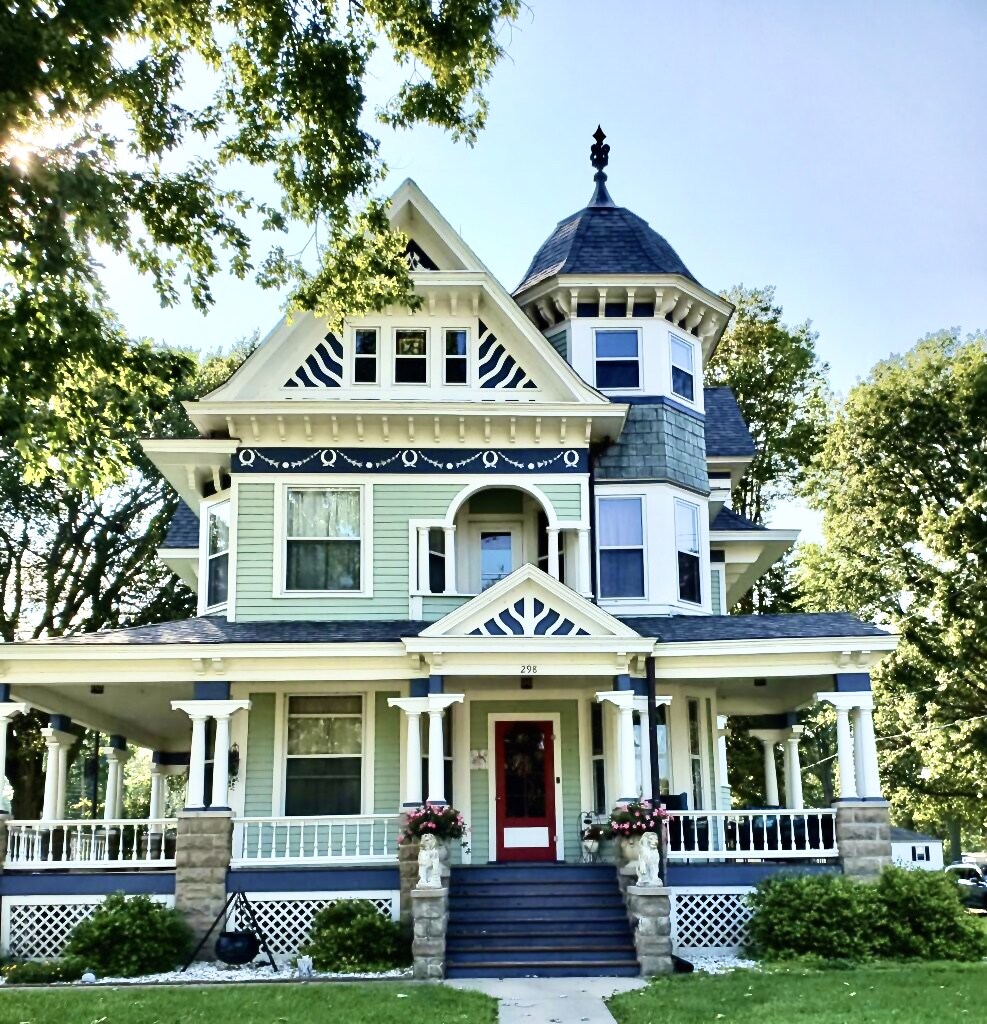

- Location within Illinois Location within the United States
- Location: 298 N. Page St., Aviston, Illinois
- Coordinates: 38°36′40″N 89°36′21″W
- Area: 0.5 acres (0.20 ha)
- Built: 1907
- Built by: Kellermann, B.H.
- Architect: Barber, George F.
- Architectural style: Queen Anne
- NRHP reference No.: 10000020
- Added to NRHP: February 17, 2010

The James C. Twiss House is a historic house located at 298 N. Page St. in Aviston, Illinois. The house was built in 1907 for James C. Twiss, a prominent Clinton County farmer. Architect George Franklin Barber, known nationally for his mail-order house designs, designed the plans for the house, which Twiss selected from a catalog. The Queen Anne house is two-and-one-half stories tall with wood siding and a limestone foundation. A hexagonal tower and a large gable with patterned woodwork mark the front facade of the house. The house's wraparound front porch is supported by Tuscan columns; a small gable, also with patterned woodwork, tops the porch at the entrance. A recessed balcony with Tuscan columns is located on the second floor above the entrance.

The house was added to the National Register of Historic Places on February 17, 2010.
