= Maude & the Bear =

Restaurant in Staunton, Virginia

Coordinates: 38°09′35″N 79°04′11″W

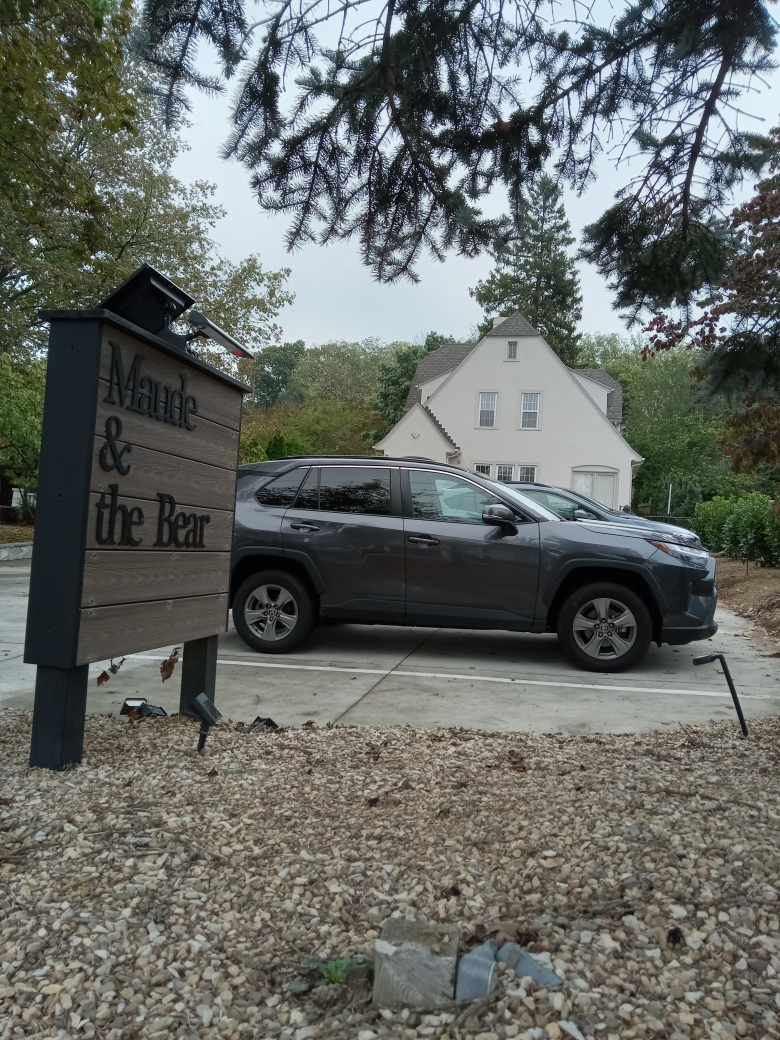
Maude & the Bear restaurant in Staunton, Virginia

Maude & the Bear is a restaurant in Staunton, Virginia. Opened in April 2024, it was named to The New York Times' list of the 50 best restaurants in the United States for 2025.

== History ==
Ian and Leslie Boden founded Maude & the Bear in April 2024. Ian Boden is the head chef. It was named a best new restaurant for 2025 by Esquire magazine. The restaurant is located in a 1926 Montgomery Ward kit house and features an adjoining inn.

Boden has twice been a semifinalist for the James Beard Best Chef award. He also owns The Shack in Staunton (where Michael Skipper is the head chef) and previously worked at the Glass Haus restaurant in Charlottesville.

The name of the restaurant is a reference to the Bodens’ nicknames for their two children.
