= The Aladdin Company =

Company that sold mail-order houses

- Company type: Kit houses
- Founded: 1906
- Defunct: 1987 (Relaunched in 2014)
- Fate: Ceased all operations
- Headquarters: Bay City, Michigan and now, Vienna, Virginia
- Key people: W. J. Sovereign, O. E. Sovereign, Charles W. Munro
- Products: Houses, Garages, Various Buildings
- Revenue: $5,400,000 (1950)

The Aladdin Company was a pioneer in the pre-cut, mail order home industry. Sometimes referred to as Aladdin Readi-Cut Houses, the company was the first to offer a true kit house composed of precut, numbered pieces. Its primary competitors were Montgomery Ward and Sears, Roebuck and Co. (Sears Modern Homes) in the US and Eaton's in Canada. Two other kit home manufacturers, Lewis and Sterling, were also based in Bay City. Aladdin began operations in 1906 and ceased operations in 1987. In 2014 the rights to the company name and logo were acquired by Charles Munro and sold in 2018.

== History ==
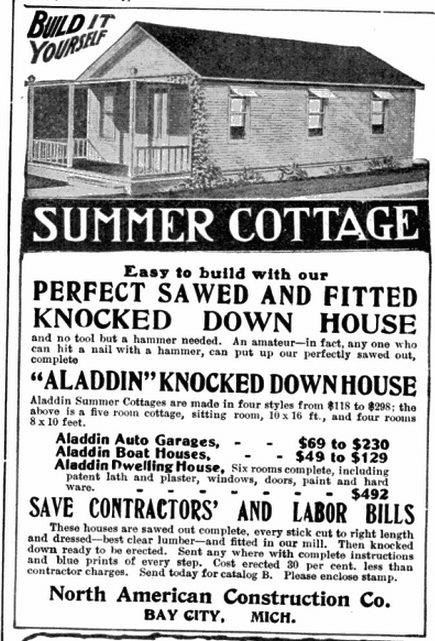
Advertisement for knocked down kits for houses, in Popular Mechanics, May 1908.

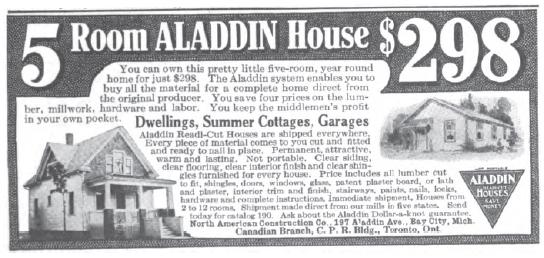
1915 magazine ad

=== Origins ===
Aladdin was founded by two brothers, W. J. Sovereign and O. E. Sovereign in Bay City, Michigan, after W. J. observed the success of the Brooks Boat Mfg. Co. in selling knock-down boats. The company began by selling boat houses, garages and summer cottages.

Almost immediately the company was also involved in the Canadian market, and eventually opened a branch office in the prestigious Canadian Pacific Building in Toronto, and several other regional offices in Canada.

=== Boom years ===
Aladdin quickly expanded to become one of largest mail-order house companies. By 1915 sales surpassed $1 million (~$22.4 million in 2024). In 1918 Aladdin alone accounted for 2.37 percent of all housing starts in the United States, around 1,800 homes. The company's greatest success came from sales to industries which constructed company towns around new plants, mines and mills. The town of Hopewell, Virginia was largely developed by the DuPont Company using Aladdin homes. In 1917 Aladdin shipped 252 houses to Birmingham, England for the Austin Motor Company who built Austin Village to house workers for munitions, tank and aircraft manufacture during World War I.

=== Decline ===
Aladdin began the development of a planned community called Aladdin City in southern Miami-Dade County, Florida, during the Florida land boom of the 1920s. The collapse of the boom not long after construction had begun proved disastrous. Aladdin's output fell below 1000 homes in 1928 on the eve of the Great Depression, and never recovered. It exited the Canadian market in 1952. The company continued to produce catalogues, and maintained sales of a few hundred homes per year through the 1960s. During the 1970s sales fell further and by 1982 the company ceased manufacturing. The company ceased all operations in 1987.

=== Relaunch ===
In 2014, the Aladdin Company was re-established by Charles Munro and re-registered the original Company Trademark. The company was sold and changed management in 2018.

=== Contributions ===
The Aladdin Company, along with other catalogue-home businesses, played a key role in providing affordable housing to Americans in the period between the turn of the twentieth century and World War II. It also made key advancements in the prefabrication of housing which would enable the post-war housing boom. Finally, it helped to propagate preferences across the U.S. and Canada for common architectural styles such as the Craftsman, Bungalow, Four-Square and Cape Cod homes.

== See also ==
- Kit house
- Sears Modern Homes
