= Redmond Park-Grande Avenue Historic District =

Historic district in Iowa, United States

- Redmond Park-Grande Avenue; Historic District
- U.S. National Register of Historic Places
- U.S. Historic district
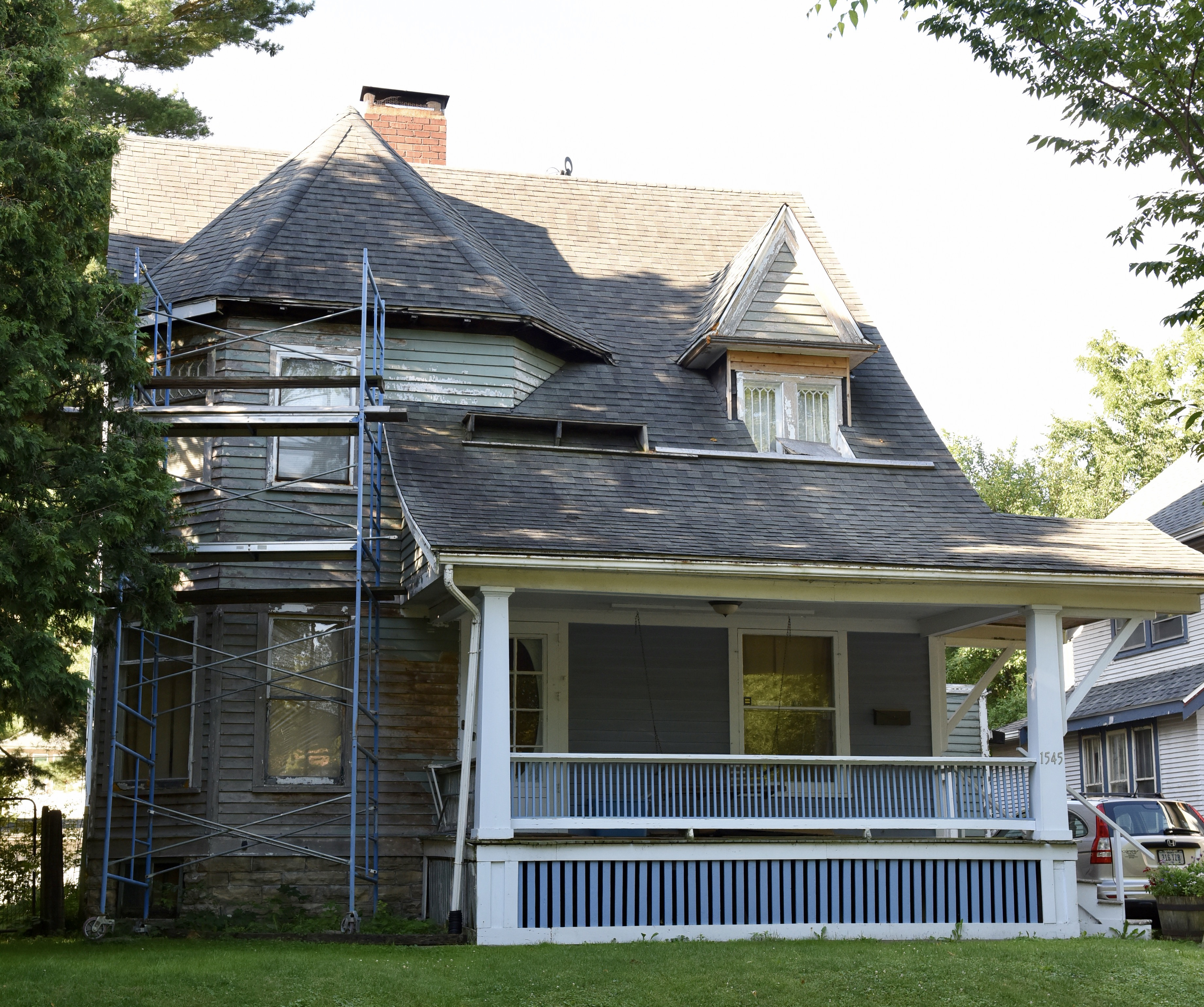
- Russell & Clara Mantz House (1900)

- Location within Iowa Location within the United States
- Location: Roughly bounded by U.S. Route 151, 19th St., and Washington Ave., Cedar Rapids, Iowa
- Coordinates: 41°59′16″N 91°38′42″W
- Area: 40.75 acres (16.49 ha)
- Architectural style: Bungalow/Craftsman; Colonial Revival
- MPS: Cedar Rapids, Iowa MPS
- NRHP reference No.: 01000994
- Added to NRHP: September 10, 2001

The Redmond Park-Grande Avenue Historic District is a nationally recognized historic district located in Cedar Rapids, Iowa, United States. It was listed on the National Register of Historic Places in 2001. At the time of its nomination it consisted of 196 resources, which included 193 contributing buildings, one contributing site, and two non-contributing buildings. This area was developed as a streetcar suburb at the turn of the 20th century. It includes single-family dwellings, two churches, and an apartment building. The southern part of the district, known as the Bever Park additions, was developed by brothers James and George Bever. The northern part of the district, known as Grande Avenue Place Addition, was developed by several developers, including the Bevers. The people who lived here were middle and upper income households. Local business leaders and professional people lived alongside salesmen and railroad workers.

The buildings are representative of various architectural styles and vernacular building forms popular from the 1890s through the 1930s. No known architect designed houses have been located here, but it is possible that local architect Charles Dieman had commissions here. Several of the American Foursquare and the Craftsman houses are similar to those found in the Davenport-based Gordon–Van Tine Company catalogs from the 1910s and the 1920s. They manufactured pre-cut mail-order homes, and people may have bought their products and had them assembled here.
