= Chester Valentine House =

Historic house in New York, United States

- U.S. National Register of Historic Places
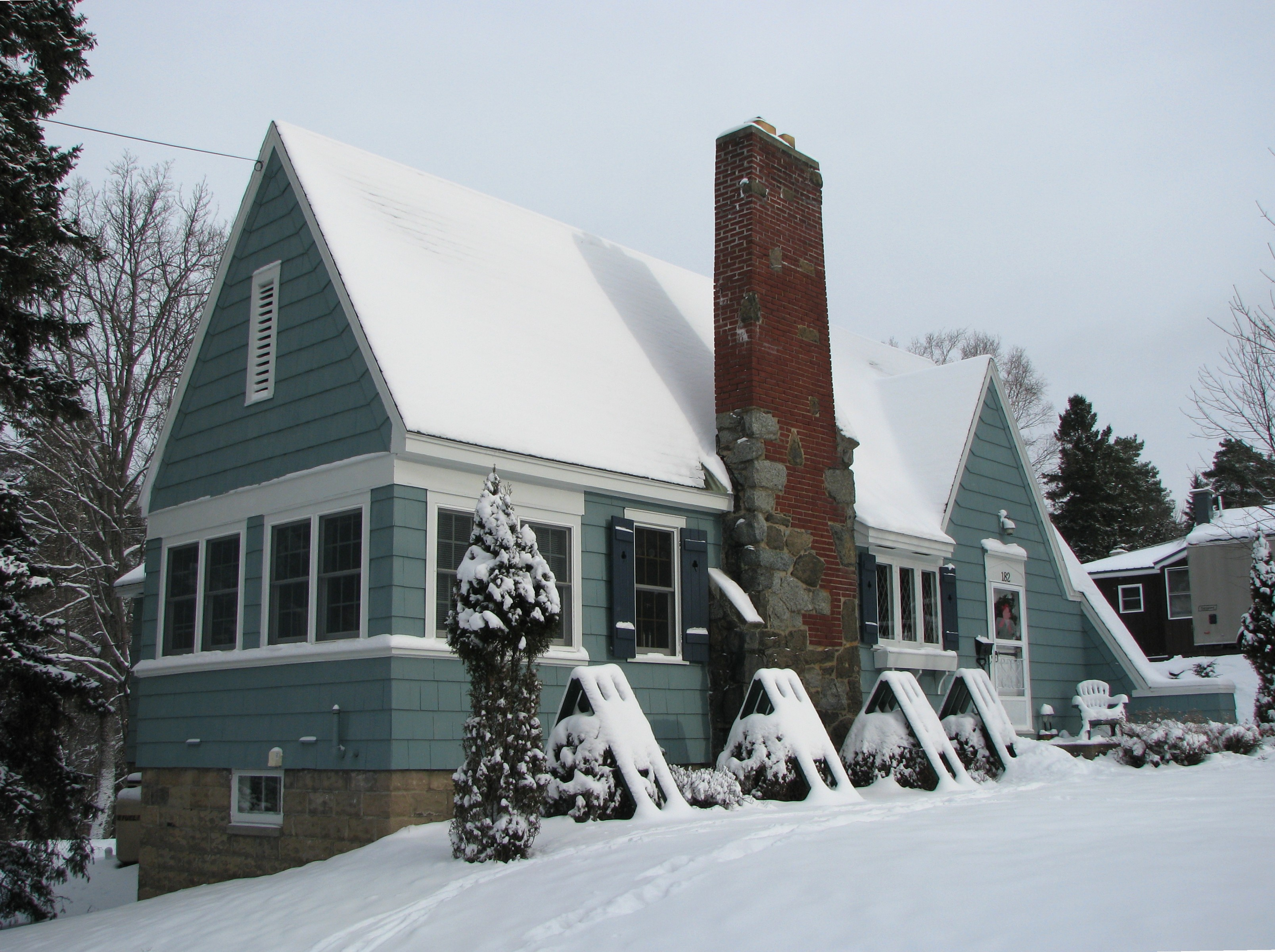

- Location within New York Location within the United States
- Location: 182 Lake St. Saranac Lake, New York
- Coordinates: 44°19′21″N 74°08′32″W
- Area: 0.57 acres (0.23 ha)
- Built: 1932
- Architectural style: Tudor Revival
- NRHP reference No.: 15000028
- Added to NRHP: February 23, 2015

Chester Valentine House, also known as Strathmore Cottage, is a historic Strathmore model Sears kit house located at Saranac Lake, Franklin County, New York. It was built in 1932, and is a one-story, L-shaped plan dwelling in the Tudor Revival style. It features a gabled entrance, diamond-pane casement windows, and a prominent brick and stone chimney.

It was added to the National Register of Historic Places in 2015.
