= Lindal Homes =

American prefabricated home manufacturer

- Type: Private
- Industry: Construction
- Predecessor: Colonial Homes
- Founded: December 31, 1944; 81 years ago in Toronto, Canada
- Founder: Sir Walter Lindal
- Headquarters: Seattle, United States
- Area served: North America, Hawaii, Japan, Korea, England, France, Germany, Russia
- Key people: Christina Lindal, president Robert Lindal, chairman
- Products: Prefabricated buildings
- Revenue: $50 million (2005)
- Number of employees: 193 (2006)
- Website: lindal.com

Lindal Homes (est. in 1944) is an American manufacturer of prefabricated post-and-beam homes. Since 1950s it is the largest North American manufacturer of prefabricated cedar homes. In the 1960s it was the largest US manufacturer of A-frame houses. The company operates as a third-generation, family-owned private company.

== History ==
Lindal Homes was established by Sir Walter Lindal in the end of 1944 in Toronto, Canada as Colonial Homes. Lindal studied architecture at the University of Ottawa and sold lumber before World War II. During the war he served in the Canadian Army Corps of Engineers and became interested in prefabricated housing. Lindal originally picked Toronto as it was at that time Canada's fastest growing city.

In 1962, the company built a sawmill outside Vancouver, British Columbia, next moved to Tacoma and finally settled in Seattle in 1971. Since 1950s it is the largest North American manufacturer of prefabricated cedar homes. In the mid 60s, after relocating to Tacoma, the company entered the A-frame houses market. In 1965 it developed a patented low-cost A-frame house that made it market leader in this segment.

In 1971, Lindal Homes became a public company in and traded on NYSE until March 2001, when the family bought the company out.

In 1973, the firm established a Japanese subsidiary, Lindal Cedar Homes K.K. It had, however, limited success in Japan selling only 50 or 60 houses a year in the early 90s. Walter's son Robert "Bob" Lindal became CEO and president in 1981.

In 1983, the company bought Justus Cedar Homes, Inc., a US prefabricated homes company in Tacoma, Washington that the Hungarian craftsman and businessman George R. Justus established in 1954. Lindal added Justus designs to its product line. Around the same time, in 1982, it discontinued its A-frame business.

In 1999 the company had 180 showroom dealers. The company has experienced hard times due mainly to the rising price of western red cedar from Canada. It has been losing money since 1997 and had to cut costs, sold a sawmill in British Columbia and launched new lines of cheaper precut homes.

Walter Lindal died in 2011. In November 2018, the company sold its Seattle office in an A-frame building near Interstate 5, which Bob Lindal called a necessary step forward, noting it was no longer practical to maintain a model home by the freeway. In September 2022, his daughter Christina Lindal became president after gradually assuming responsibility; she had been executive vice president, while Bob remains chairman of the board.

== Building method ==
Lindal Homes relies on traditional post-and-beam construction while using architectural-grade glulam posts and beams for added stability and endurance. It is suitable for green building.

== Design ==
In 2003, Lindal Homes partnered with the architect Michael Graves to produce Michael Graves Pavilion, a set of 3 low-cost pavilions distributed through Target. In 2004, it hired architect Jim Cutler, an architect behind Bill Gates's house, to design two floor Reflection Home Series.

In 2009, Lindal Homes, was selected as a production company for three prefab houses designed by Marmol Radziner and Turkel Design for Dwell Homes. These houses were included into The Green Design 100 list compiled by TIME. In 2012, a Gambier Island house from this collection designed by Joel Turkel of Turkel Design won Best in American Living Awards from the National Association of Home Builders.

In 2011, the company delivered a custom-designed 7,500 square foot house in Bucks County, Pennsylvania, their largest ever.

In 2013, Lindal Homes introduced the Lindal Architects Collaborative, hiring 8 architectural firms (including Altius Architects, Bates Masi + Architects, Carney Logan Burke Architects, David Vandervort Architects, Dowling Studios, the Frank Lloyd Wright School of Architecture, Marmol Radziner and ZeroEnergy Design) to design houses using post-and-beam structure.

As of 2014, the company had more than 3000 home designs.
