= Sears Modern Homes =

Fabricated houses sold primarily through mail order

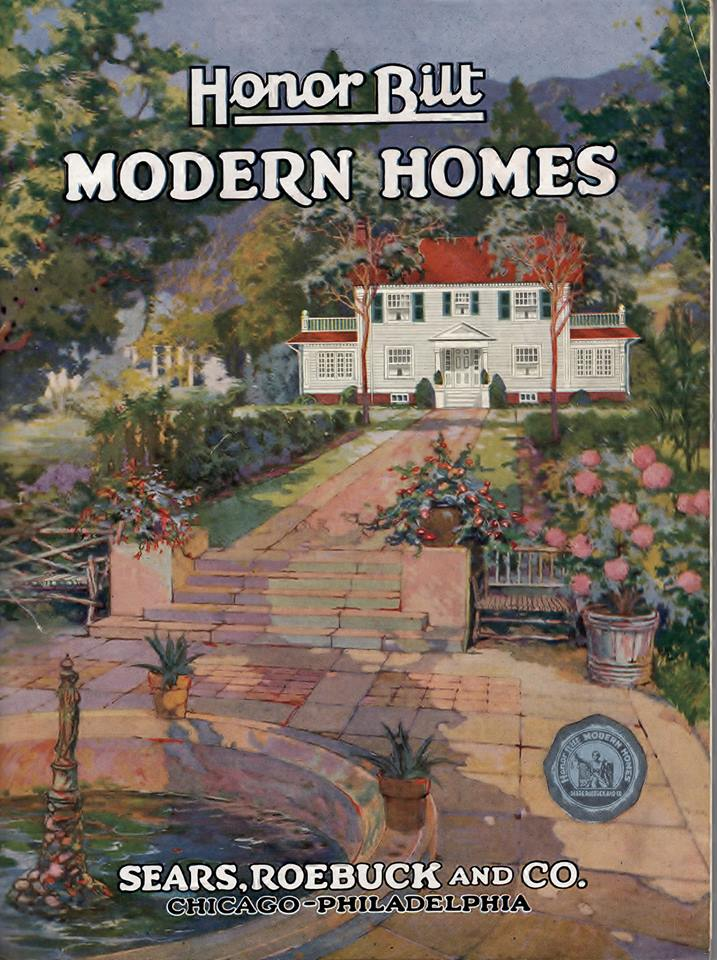
Cover of 1922 Sears Modern Homes catalog

Sears Modern Homes were houses sold primarily through mail order catalog by Sears, Roebuck and Co., an American retailer.

From 1908 to 1942, Sears sold more than 70,000 of these houses in North America. Sears Modern Homes were purchased primarily by customers in East Coast and Midwest states but have been located as far south as Florida, as far west as California, and as far north as Alaska and Canada. No complete record of their locations was left by Sears when they closed the Modern Homes program but current-day researchers are compiling a database of those that have been found so far and the list continues to grow.

Sears Modern Homes offered more than 370 designs in a wide range of architectural styles and sizes over the line's 34-year history. Most included the latest comforts and conveniences available to house buyers in the early part of the twentieth century, such as central heating, indoor plumbing, telephone, and electricity.

Primarily shipped via railroad boxcars, these kits included most of the materials needed to build a house. Once delivered, many of these houses were assembled by the new homeowner, relatives, friends and neighbors, in a fashion similar to the traditional barn-raisings of farming families. Other homeowners relied on local carpenters or contractors to assemble the houses. In some cases, Sears provided construction services to assemble the homes. Some builders and companies purchased houses directly from Sears to build as model homes, speculative homes, or homes for customers or employees. Although most shipments came by rail, newspaper advertisements in the late 1920s and early 1930s showed Sears offering truck delivery to buyers living within a 35-mile (56 km) radius of their Newark, New Jersey, plant and their Norwood, Ohio, Sash & Door company.

Sears discontinued its Modern Homes catalog after 1940 with sales through local sales offices continuing into 1942. Years later, the sales records related to home sales were destroyed during a corporate house cleaning. As only a small percentage of these homes were documented when built, finding these houses today often requires detailed research to properly identify them. Because the various kit home companies often copied plan elements or designs from each other, there are a number of catalog and kit models from different manufacturers that look similar or identical to models offered by Sears. Determining which company manufactured a particular catalog and kit home may require additional research to determine the origin of that home.

== History ==
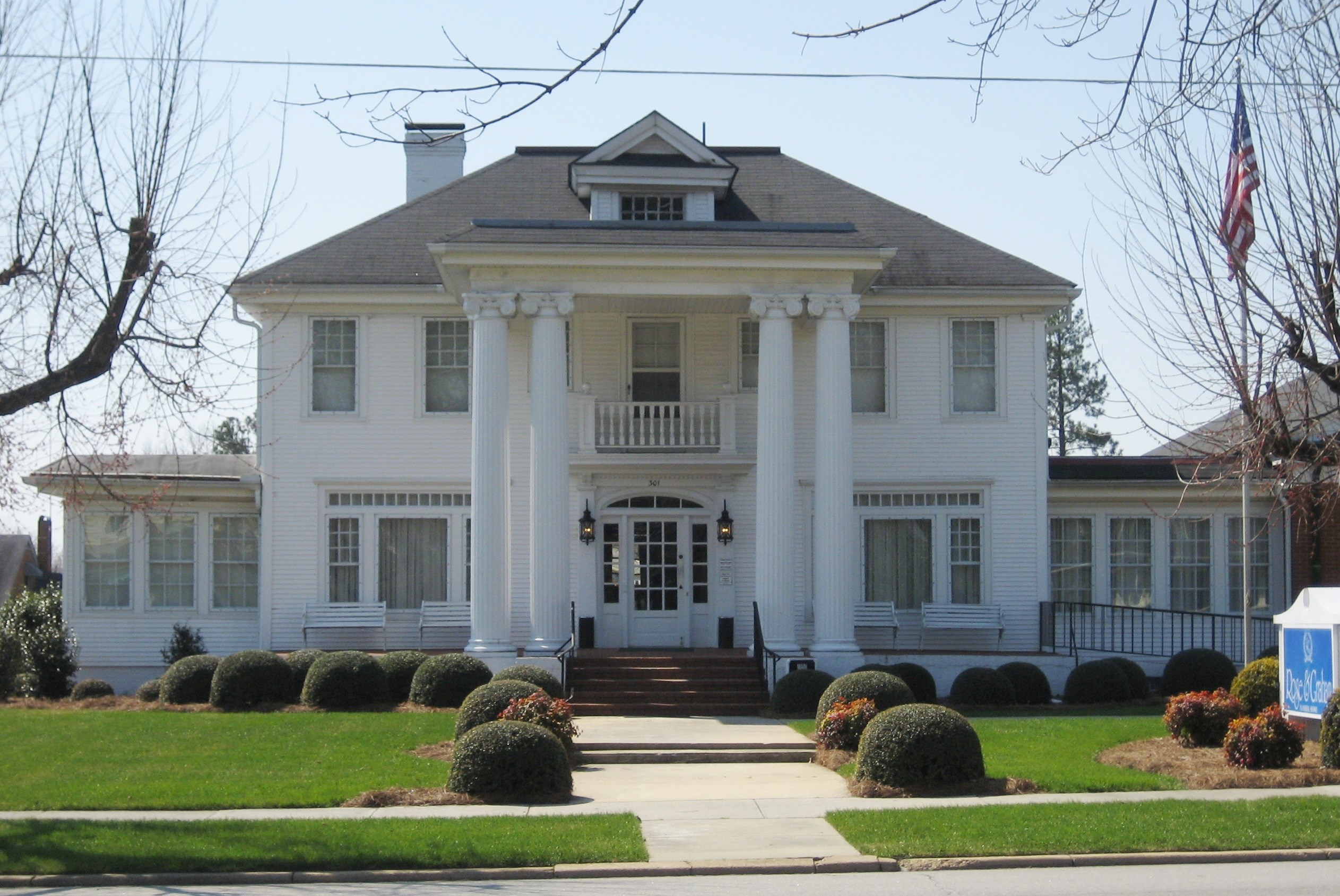
Sears Magnolia in Benson, North Carolina

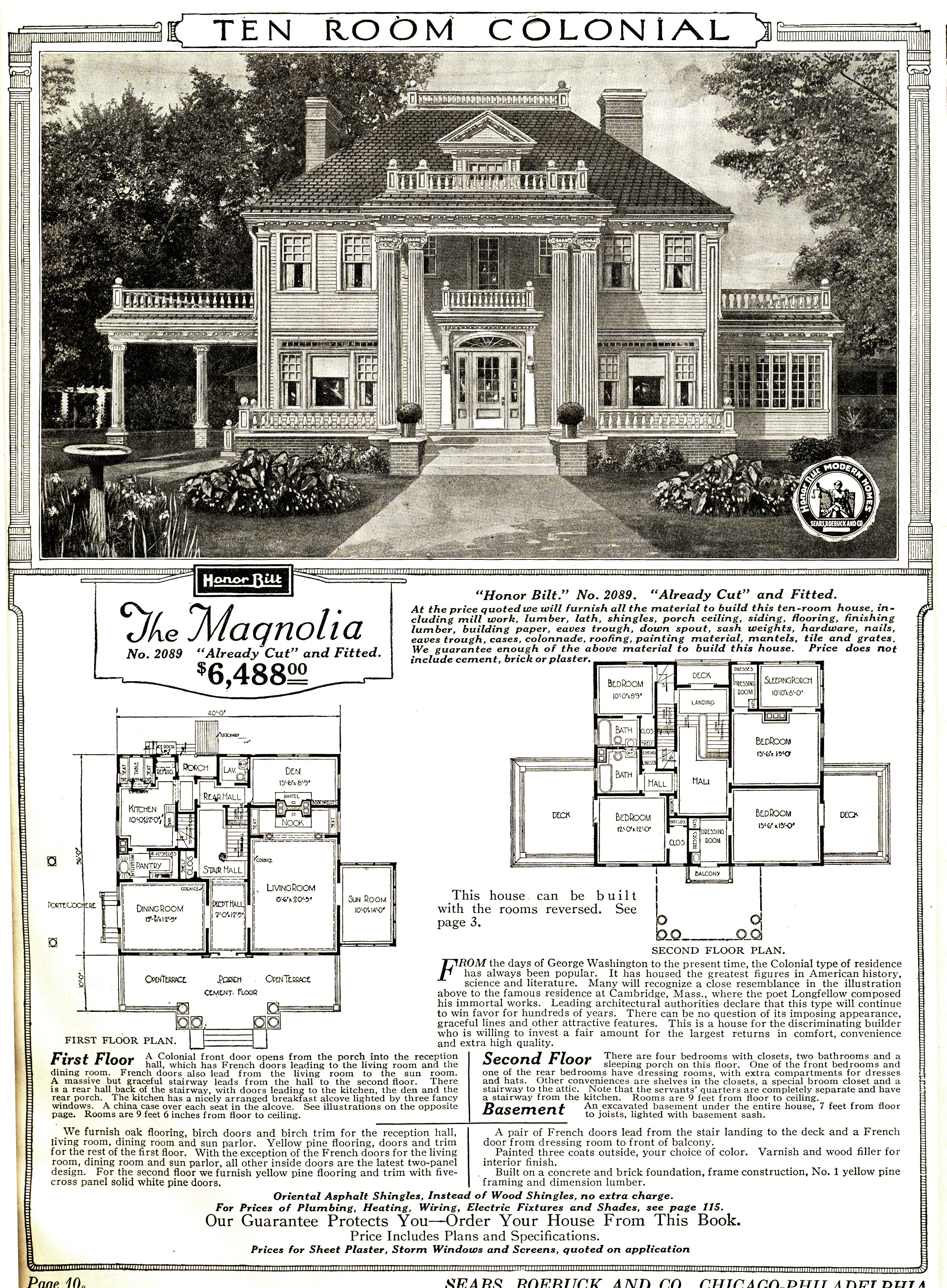
Catalog image and floorplan of Sears Magnolia model

=== 1908–1940 ===
In 1906, Frank W. Kushel, a Sears manager, was given responsibility for the catalog company's unwieldy, unprofitable building-materials department. Sales were down and excess inventory languished in warehouses. Kushel is credited with suggesting to Richard Sears that the company assemble kits of all the parts needed and sell entire houses through mail order. That year, the Aladdin Company of Bay City, Michigan, offered the first kit homes through mail order.

In 1908, Sears issued its first specialty catalog for houses, Book of Modern Homes and Building Plans, featuring 44 house styles ranging in price from US $360 to $2,890 (about $13,000 to $104,000 today). The first mail order for a Sears house was filled that year. As its mail-order catalogs were already sent to millions of homes, Sears had a distinct advantage over other kit-home competitors.

As sales grew, Sears expanded its production, shipping, and sales offices to locations across the country. To provide the materials for the Modern Homes division, Sears operated a lumber mill in Cairo, Illinois. In 1912, Sears purchased the Norwood Sash and Door Company in Norwood, Ohio (primarily used for fabrication of doors, windows, and other millwork), and, in 1926, opened a large lumber yard in Port Newark, New Jersey. The ability to mass-produce the materials used in Sears homes reduced manufacturing costs and consequently the kits' price tags.

Precut framing lumber pieces, an innovation pioneered by Aladdin, were first offered by Sears in 1916. Precut lumber was cut to the appropriate lengths and angles based on where the framing lumber would be used in the house, and letter/number codes were stamped on the pre-cut lumber pieces, coordinating with labels found on the blueprints for the house. Before 1916, the home builder had to cut their Sears-supplied lumber to appropriate lengths. These pre-1916 houses are generally considered catalog houses, not kit houses. Pre-cut lumber reduced construction time by up to 40%, according to Sears.

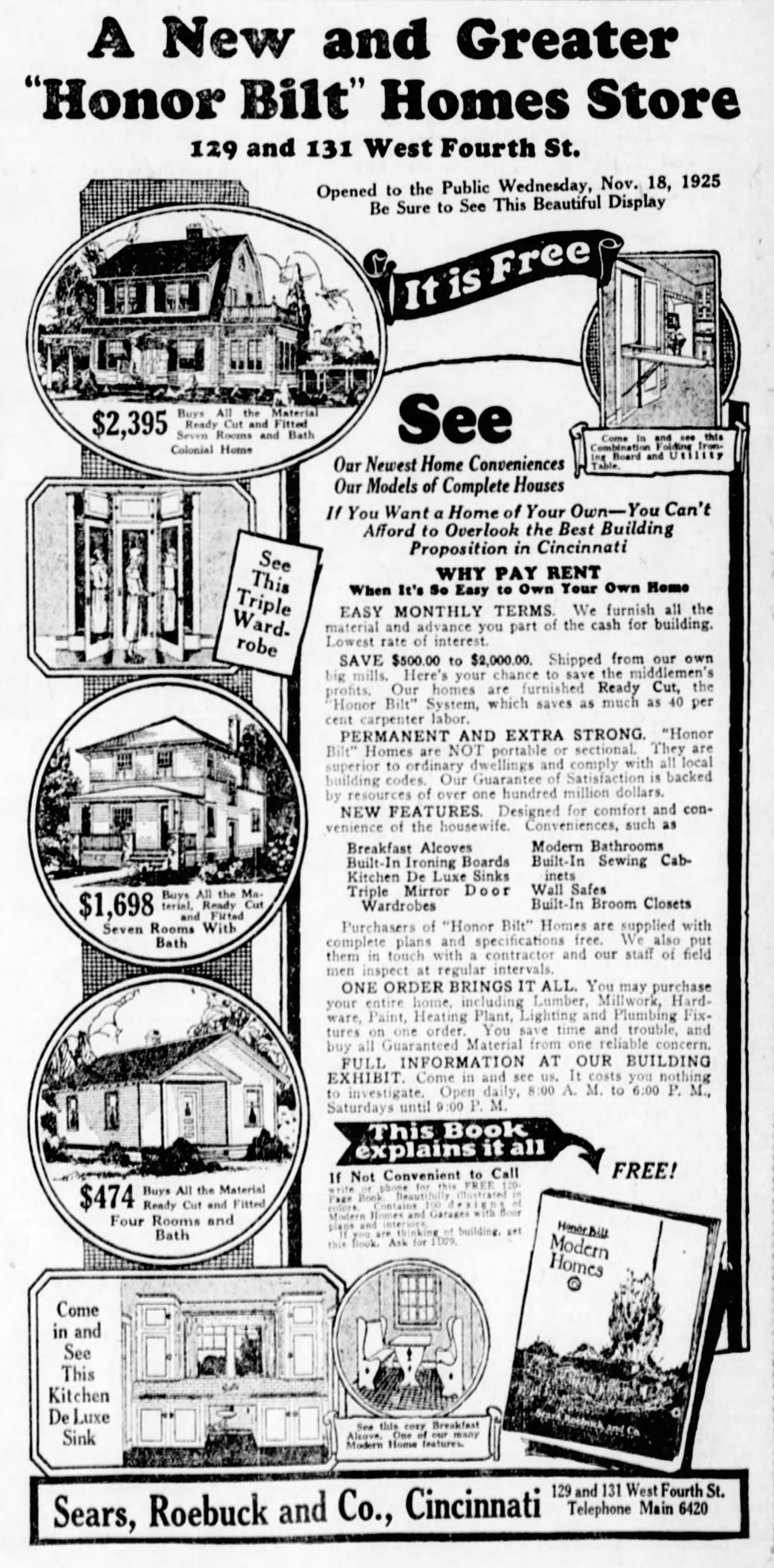
Sears "Honor Bilt" homes ad, 1925

The houses were designed with "balloon style" framing that eliminated the need for a team of skilled carpenters, reducing cost and construction time for the buyer. This system used precut lumber of mostly standard sizes (2"x4" and 2"x8") for framing. Balloon-framing systems rely only on nails to make connections between joints, whereas previous methods used heavier members and pegs. The method's name reflected that the structure was light and could be lifted away like a balloon. Early balloon structures were very basic, to enable home buyers to assemble them independently and also because designers had yet to see the implications the method held.

Shipped by railroad boxcar, and then usually trucked to a home site, the average Sears Modern Home kit had about 25 tons of materials, with more than 30,000 parts. Plumbing, electrical fixtures, and heating systems were options that could be ordered at additional cost; they were many families' first steps to modern HVAC systems, kitchens, and bathrooms. During the Modern Homes program, large quantities of asphalt shingles became available. Asphalt shingles were cheap to manufacture and ship, and easy and inexpensive to install. Sears also offered a plasterboard product similar to modern drywall (under the name Goodwall) as an alternative to the plaster and lath wall-building techniques which required skilled carpenters and plasterers. This product offered the advantages of low price, ease of installation, and added fire protection. Local building requirements sometimes dictated that certain elements of the house construction be done professionally and varied depending on where the house was constructed.

=== Economic aspects ===
Sears began offering financing plans around 1912. Early mortgage loans were typically for 5 to 15 years at 6% to 7% interest. Sales peaked in 1929, just before the Great Depression. While financing through Sears helped many homeowners purchase homes, a number of those purchasers defaulted during the ensuing Great Depression. The company was forced to liquidate $11 million in defaulted debt. The mortgage program was also a public relations disaster, as many of the families Sears foreclosed upon refused to do further business with the company.

Sears stopped offering mortgages at the end of 1933. In 1935, some newspaper reports stated that Sears had "discontinued" the "modern homes department". However, there's no evidence that Sears actually stopped selling homes and it continued to issue a new "Modern Homes" catalog throughout the 1930s. Home sales slowly recovered as the United States emerged from the Great Depression.

=== After 1940 ===
The last "Modern Homes" catalog was issued in 1940. Although it is sometimes claimed that no Sears kit homes were built after 1940, Sears continued to offer pre-cut kit homes through 1941 and into early 1942. Advertisements for Sears Modern Homes appeared through May 1942. Many of these post 1940 homes were based on models from the 1940 and earlier Sears catalogs but not all were, leading to debate over whether these homes qualify as "Sears Modern Homes". Because these homes were constructed using pre-cut lumber and plans provided by Sears, these homes can be considered to be "Sears Modern Homes". Many of these homes were built in Sears planned "Home Club Plan" developments in New Jersey, New York, Ohio and Pennsylvania.

== Models ==
Sears offered roughly 370 models over the 32 years it sold houses by catalog, with an average of 80 to 100 models in each catalog. The models offered in each catalog varied each year, with some models remaining over long periods, and others appearing in only a few catalogs. In the early years, the models were identified with numbers. In 1918, Sears began assigning names to the various models. Some models were offered with variations, the most common of those being expanded floor plans and additional finished living spaces. Sears houses could also be ordered with reversed floor plans. While the vast majority of models were for single-family house designs, Sears offered some duplex house designs and even a few larger multiple-family buildings.

The most popular models appeared in the catalog for multiple years. Other models only appeared for one year. No built examples have been found of some of the least popular models. Some models were offered in both wood siding and brick veneer versions with different names attributed to the same or almost identical home plan. Some of the most popular models were:

- Alhambra
- Argyle
- Avondale
- Barrington
- Conway/Uriel
- Cornell
- Crafton
- Crescent
- Dover
- Elsmore
- Gladstone/Langston
- Hampton
- Hathaway
- Lewiston
- Lynnhaven
- Maplewood
- Osborn
- Starlight
- Sunlight
- Vallonia
- Westly
- Willard
- Winona

The largest and one of the most expensive Sears models was the Magnolia. Only seven Magnolias are known to be still standing. One Magnolia built in Lincoln, Nebraska, was demolished in 1985.

In addition to houses, the 1908 Sears catalog offered a kit schoolhouse with the model name "Schoolhouse No. 5008". The two-story schoolhouse was priced at $11,500 (equal to $412,083 today) and its design included six classrooms, a library, an auditorium, and a superintendent's office. 1908 was the only year the schoolhouse appeared in the catalog. It is unknown whether any were purchased or built.

There was no single architect for the Sears designs. Many of the famous designs were commandeered from other sources and/or purchased from architects but given just enough change to be advertised as their own. Later on in the Modern Homes timeline, Sears had in-office designers but titled them as "experts" rather than actual architects.

== Identifying Sears Modern Homes ==
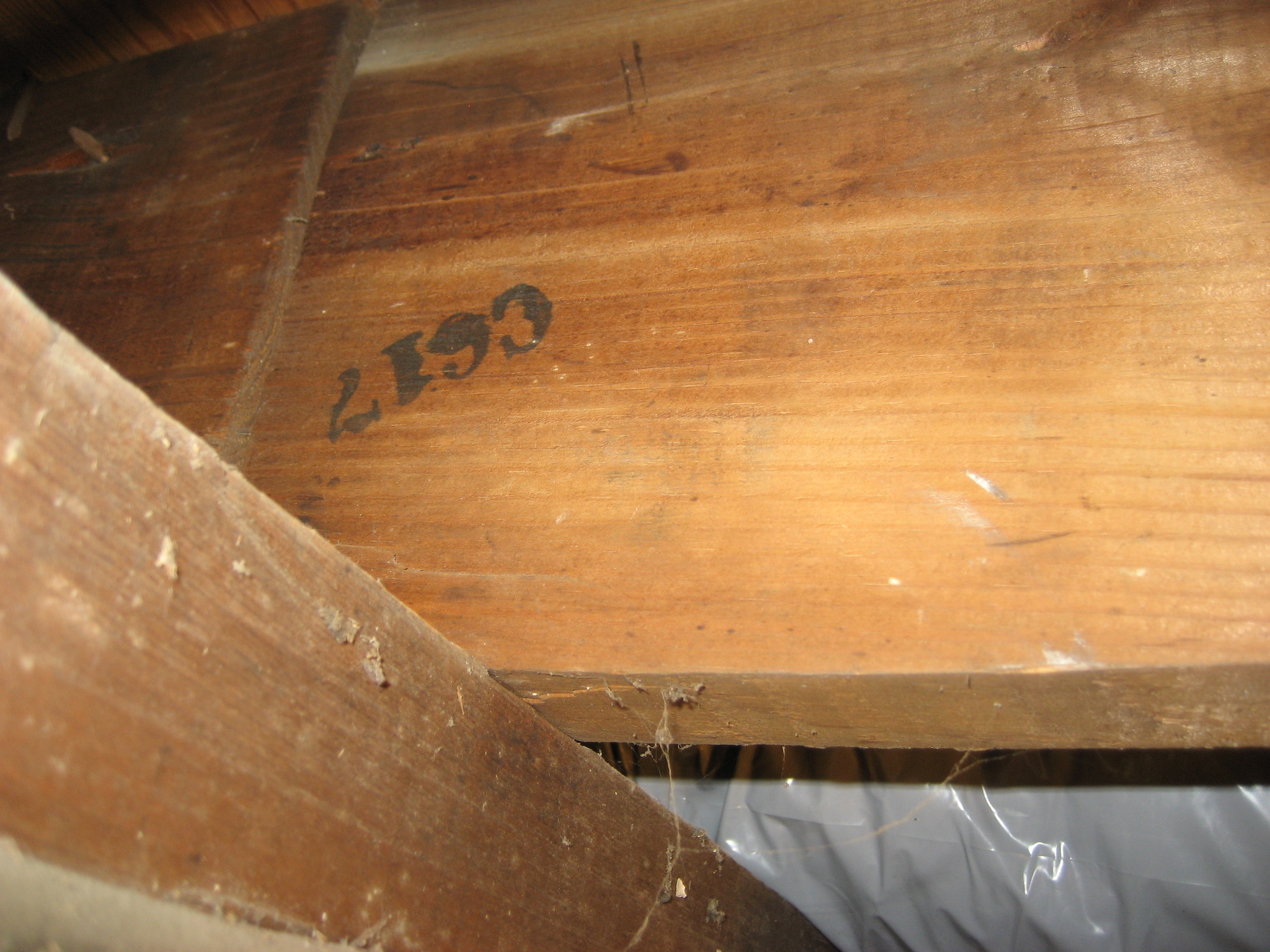
Stamped lumber in a Sears house

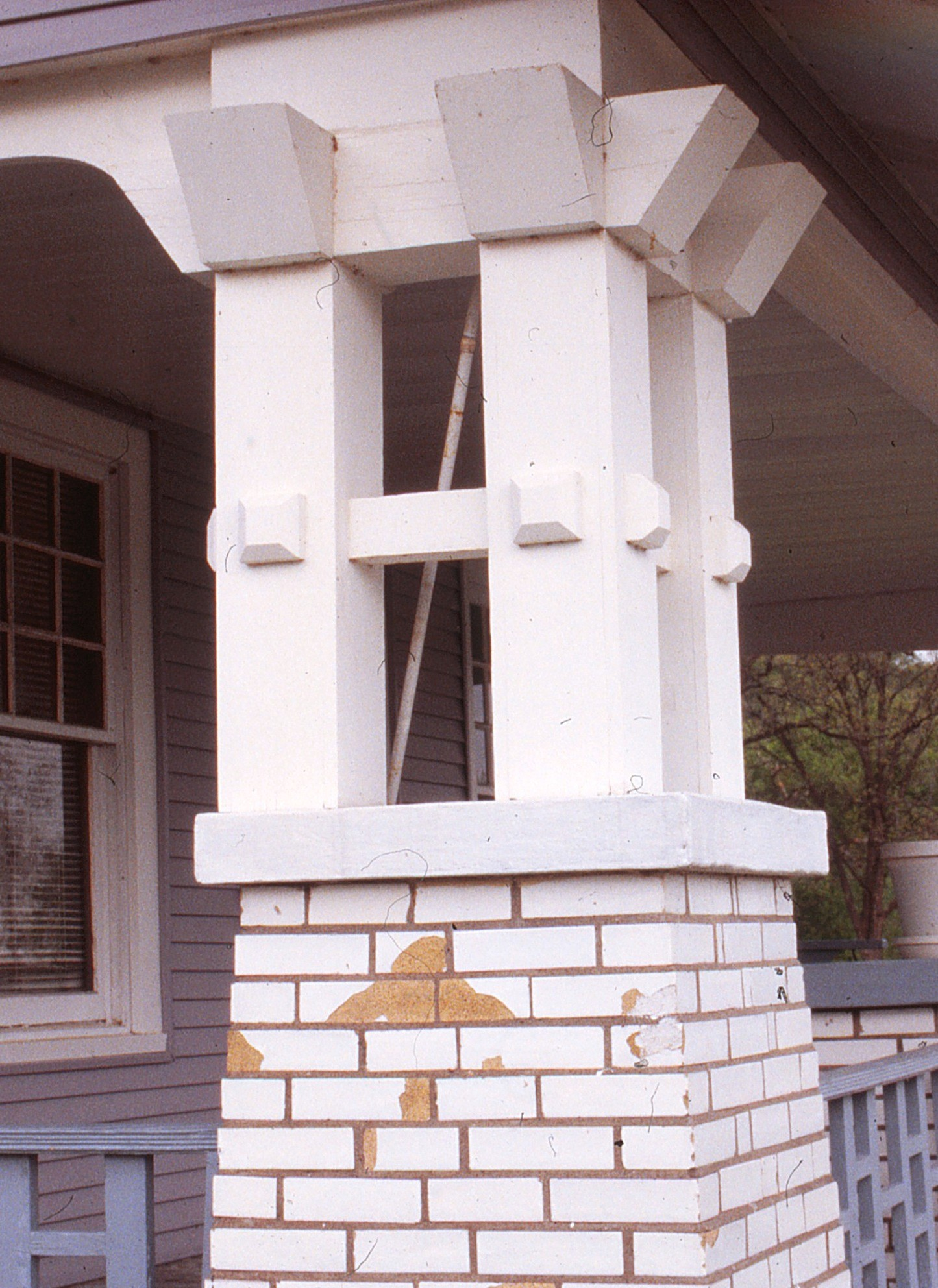
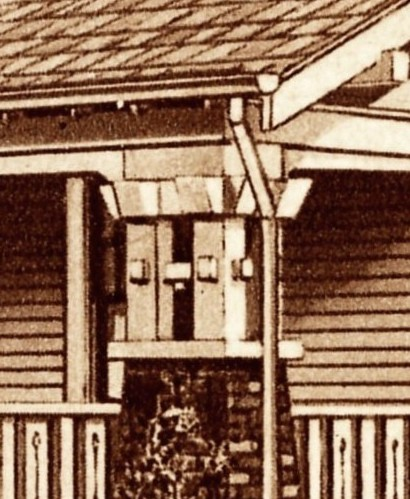
Column detail from a Sears Vallonia house, pictured alongside its appearance in the catalog

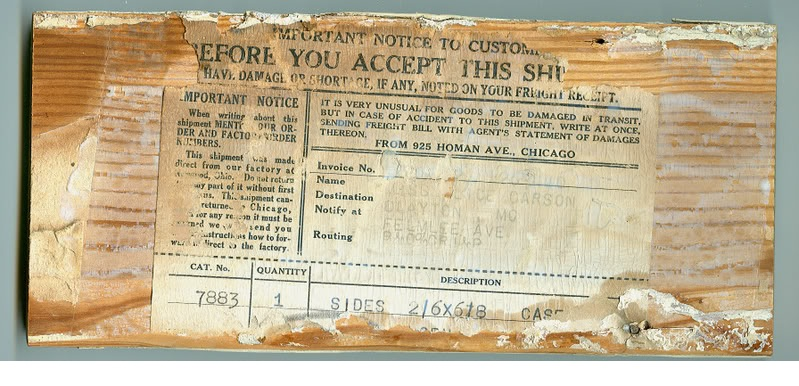
Shipping Label from a Sears house

Identifying Sears Homes has become a pastime among history enthusiasts because of their sturdy structure, the do-it-yourself nature of construction, and the popular architectural design concepts. However, many houses described as Sears Homes are not true Sears Homes, being either the product of another kit home manufacturer or not a kit home at all. National and regional competitors in the catalog and kit house market included Aladdin, Bennett, Gordon-Van Tine, Harris Brothers, Lewis, Pacific Ready Cut Homes, Sterling and Montgomery Ward (Wardway) Homes.

Sears houses can be identified or authenticated using the following methods:

1. Sears Modern Homes were sold between 1908 and 1942. There is some debate about whether some homes from Sears that were built in 1941 and 1942 qualify as Sears Modern Homes. Some of these homes were based on models offered in the Sears Modern Homes catalog. Others were not, but were still pre-cut kit homes built from plans and materials from Sears. Researchers have provided support for the end-date of 1942 in some areas of the country, however.
2. Original paperwork for the house including blueprints and letters of correspondence from Sears.
3. Public records: From 1911 to 1933, Sears offered home mortgages and Sears company officials or the Sears, Roebuck corporation may be named on the mortgage or deed associated with the property where the home was constructed. Sears company officials most commonly listed on mortgages and deeds include:
  - Edwards D. Ford (starting in 1929)
  - Walker O. Lewis (primarily before early 1930)
  - John M. Ogden
  - E. Harrison Powell (starting in 1930)
  - William C. Reed (primarily from 1922 - 1929)
  - F. C. Schaub (starting in 1932)
  - Nicholas Wieland (sometimes spelled Weiland)

4. Cities that have records of building permits may list Sears, Roebuck as the original architect. Homes in and around southern Ohio may have financing documents through the "Norwood Sash and Door Company" of Norwood, Ohio. Some Home Club homes have deeds from the "Port Newark Lumber and Material Company".
5. Shipping labels: Often found on the back of millwork like baseboard molding or door and window trim, shipping labels associated with Sears may indicate that the home is a Sears Modern Home. Beginning in 1912, most of the millwork was fulfilled by the Sears-owned Norwood Sash and Door Company near Cincinnati, Ohio, however, the 1926 opening of Sears' Port Newark lumber yard, expanded their framing lumber and millwork supply locations. Wording on shipping labels varied, and may mention Sears Roebuck, or simply the Sears Roebuck Company address at 925 Homan Avenue in Chicago, or the Norwood Sash & Door company. It's important to remember that building materials like millwork could be purchased separately from Sears so millwork with shipping labels is not, by itself, a definitive indicator of a Sears Modern house.
6. Stamped lumber: Most easily found in unfinished spaces like a basement or attic, framing members were stamped with a letter and a number. These stamps are normally located on or near the ends of pieces of framing lumber. However, these stamps were not used on lumber shipped before 1916, when Sears first started offering pre-cut lumber. Additionally, other kit-house companies also marked their pre-cut lumber, so marked lumber does not necessarily tie the house to Sears.
7. Goodwall sheet plaster was an early drywall-like product offered by Sears and may be an indication of a Sears Modern Home.
8. Compare house designs to original catalog images. Some models of Sears homes were very similar in design to models offered by other kit home manufacturers or through plan books. Designs may have been modified but generally should match in layout and dimensions.
9. Sears Modern Homes built in the 1930s may have a small circled "SR" cast into the bathtub in the lower corner (furthest from the tub spout and near the floor) and on the underside of the kitchen or bathroom sink. However, since Sears sold bathtubs and sinks separately, if the house does not match a model offered by Sears, this would not reliably authenticate a home as being from the Sears Modern Homes program.

== Existing Sears Homes ==
Because the Modern Homes division sales records were destroyed, there is no way to definitively verify the number of Sears houses that still exist. Documented Sears houses have been found across the United States and in a few locations in Canada. Cities with large numbers of documented Sears Modern Homes include:

- Aurora, Illinois, with 141.
- Arlington County, Virginia, with 162
- Carlinville, Illinois, with 149 in the Standard Addition neighborhood as well as several other Sears houses elsewhere in the city. Carlinville is said to have "the highest concentration of contiguous Sears homes in the nation."
- Cincinnati, Ohio, and surrounding communities in southern Ohio and Northern Kentucky with over 812.
- Downers Grove, Illinois, with 67.
- Elgin, Illinois, with 209.
- Pittsburgh, Pennsylvania, and surrounding suburbs, with 1,000 (696 in Pittsburgh itself).
- Philadelphia, Pennsylvania and surrounding communities.
- Prince George's County & Montgomery County, Maryland, with over 225.
- Rockford, Illinois with 144.
- Washington, D.C., with over 300.
- Wood River, Illinois, with 23.
- Yonkers, New York, with 121

The Carlinville, Illinois, concentration consists of houses bought in bulk by the Standard Oil Company in 1918 to house its mineworkers at a total cost of about US $1 million. The houses, comprising eight models, were all built in a 12-block area known as the Standard Addition. Construction of the houses took nine months which were completed in 1919. The bulk order is the largest known order for Sears Modern Homes and led to Sears, Roebuck naming their "Carlin" model after the city.

Not all Sears houses became private residences. At Greenlawn Cemetery, near the Hampton Roads waterfront in the Newport News, Virginia, area, the cemetery office building is a 1936 Sears Modern Home.

Like the Standard Addition in Carlinville, neighborhoods of Sears houses still hold a sense of identity and community. Due to reviews by homeowners then and now, it would appear that Sears Modern Homes are just as appreciated now as they were then. According to a review written by Mary Ann O'Boyle of Takoma Park, Maryland, her Sears home feels "unabashedly American, the kind of house you see in movies about the good old days" and "allows me to connect with the past". Another homeowner, Erskine Hogue Stanberry, states that his Saratoga model was the "first house in Chelsea to have electric lights" and that they "are using the original plumbing and wiring".

=== National Register of Historic Places ===
Several Sears Modern Homes are listed on the National Register of Historic Places. Among those are:

- Alhambra: At Triangle Ranch near Philips, South Dakota
- Saratoga: The Hogue House in Chelsea, Oklahoma
- Strathmore: Chester Valentine House in Saranac Lake, New York

Sears Modern Homes can also be found in historic districts listed in the National Register of Historic Places:

- Eastwood Historic District: 10 Sears Modern Homes of various models in Cincinnati, Ohio
- Old Town College Park: Includes a Sears Alhambra and Sears Sheridan in College Park, Maryland

== Modern interpretations of Sears Modern Homes ==
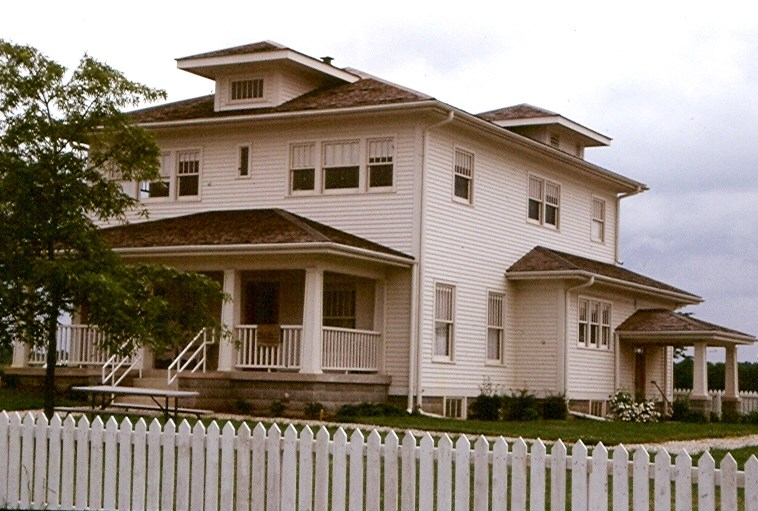
Modern reproduction of a Sears Hillrose at the Farm at Prophetstown in Battle Ground, Indiana

There are examples of modern homes built based on the design of Sears Modern Home. In some cases, homeowners used plans from original Sears homes to recreate a modern version of a Sears home. In other cases, the home followed the general design of a Sears house without being an exact duplicate.

One well-known replica of a Sears house is at the "Farm at Prophetstown" museum in Battle Ground, Indiana, which features a replica of a Hillrose model. The house forms part of the farmstead at the museum.

== See also ==
- Kit houses in North America
- American Foursquare
