= Eastwood Historic District =

Historic district in Ohio, United States

- U.S. National Register of Historic Places
- U.S. Historic district
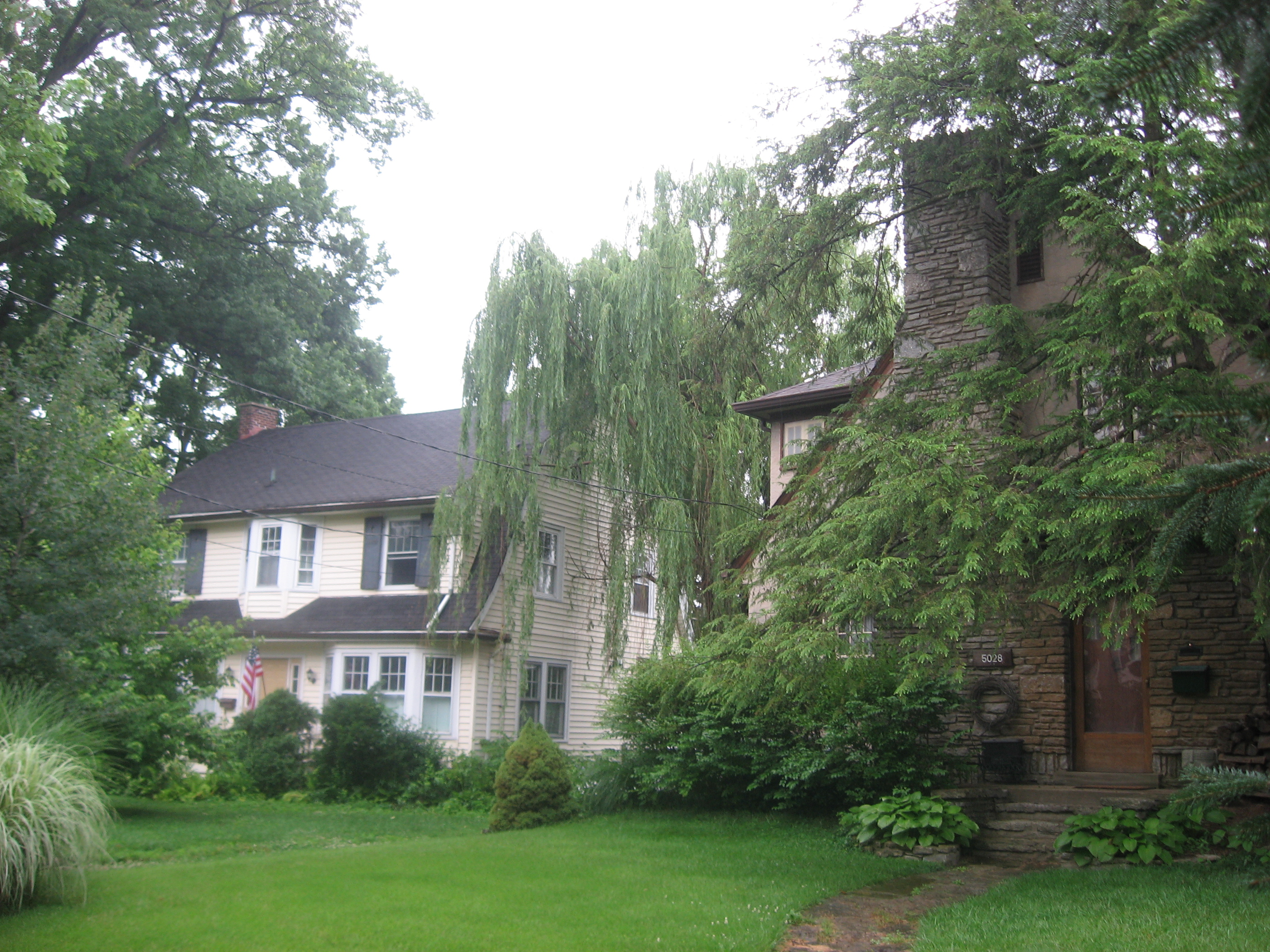
- Houses on Eastwood Circle

- Location within Ohio Location within the United States
- Location: Roughly along Eastwood, Collinwood, Overbrook, Madison and Duck Creek Rds., Cincinnati, Ohio
- Coordinates: 39°9′48″N 84°24′39″W
- Area: 152 acres (0.62 km^{2})
- Architect: Firth, Wilbur M. and Lee P.; et al.
- Architectural style: Late 19th And 20th Century Revivals, Bungalow/Craftsman
- NRHP reference No.: 05000093
- Added to NRHP: February 25, 2005

Eastwood Historic District is a registered historic district in Cincinnati, Ohio, listed in the National Register of Historic Places on February 25, 2005. It contains 86 contributing buildings. One of the unique aspects of the district are 10 models of kit houses from the Sears Modern Homes catalog.

== Historic uses ==
- Single Dwelling
- Secondary Structure
- Camp
- Business
- Clubhouse
- Medical Business/Office
- Garden
