= Stick-built construction =

Style of on-site house fabrication

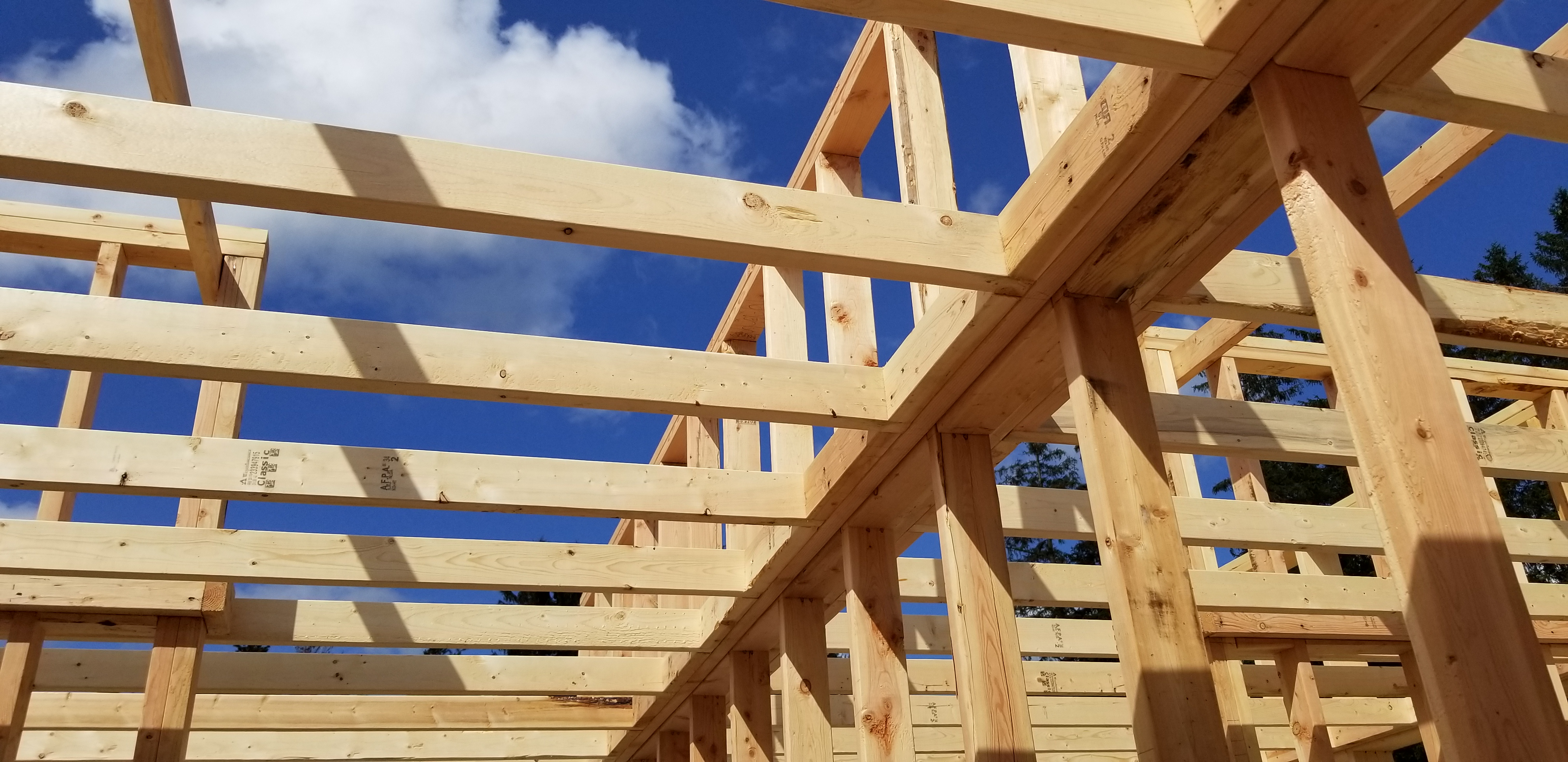
Stick-built construction framing

A stick-built home is a wooden house constructed of dimensional lumber entirely or largely on the site which it is intended to occupy upon its completion.

== Stick-built as a term ==
The term stick in the name refers specifically to the superstructure of the walls and roof as a general statement, though parts or all can use metal studs and poles. The term is primarily used to specify the construction method in comparison with other building approaches such as concrete blocks and modular homes or to contrast with other dwelling types such as mobile homes. The term is most commonly used in the US as an alternative to a prefabricated home built in a factory or similar facility.

== Construction method ==
Within the stick-built home approach, there are different framing methods for how to configure the "sticks" of the superstructure. One major shift over time was from balloon framing to platform framing. The term stick built does not necessarily inform anything about exterior materials. A stick-built home may have different types of façades, such as brick or vinyl siding. Most tend to use drywall construction inside and a shingled roofing material.

As the term stick-built often comes up in context of other construction methods, research on the topic focuses on comparing various long- and short-term cost, coding, and other project requirements that can lead to choosing one construction method over another. For instance, the simplicity of stick-built construction may offer more ability for the homeowner to perform do-it-yourself construction and maintenance.

The term has been around for a long time, but became more widely used in the 1960s and 1970s, possibly as other construction methods became more common in the US.
