= Canadian Pacific Building (Toronto) =

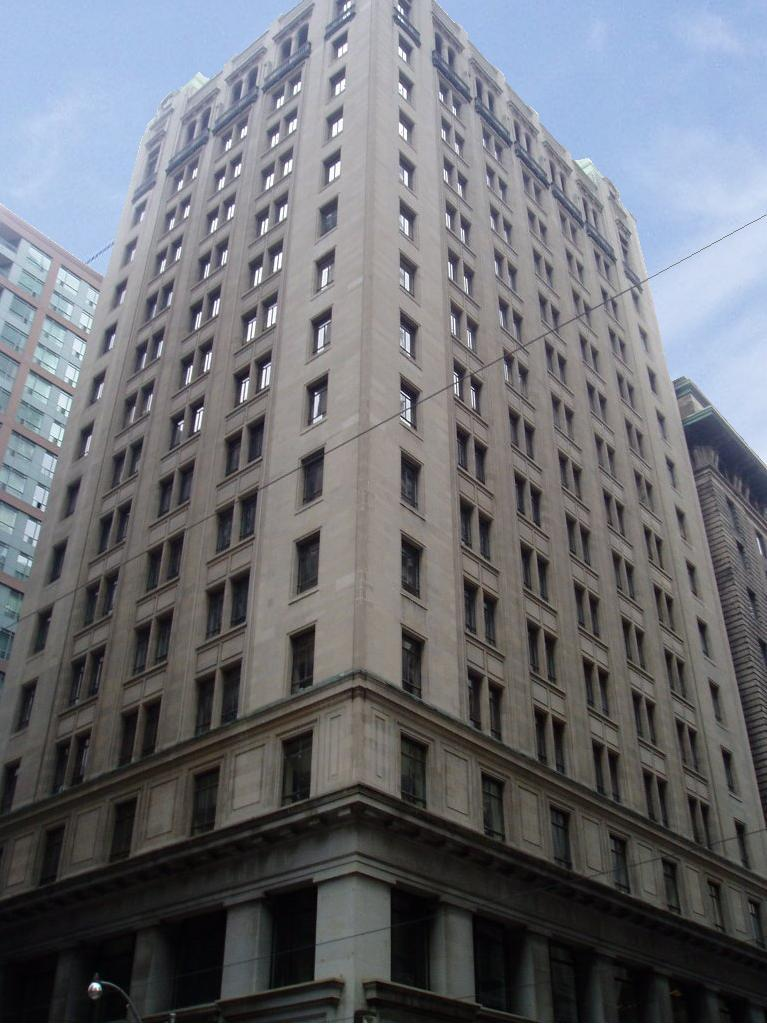
- Alternative names: Canadian Pacific Railway Building

General information
- Type: Commercial offices
- Location: 69 Yonge Street; Toronto, Ontario; M5E 1K4
- Coordinates: 43.649043°N 79.377564°W
- Completed: 1913

Height
- Roof: c. 85 m (279 ft)

Technical details
- Floor count: 15
- Lifts/elevators: 3

History
- Built: 1911-13, refaced 1929-30
- Built for: Canadian Pacific Railway
- Original use: Corporate Headquarters

Site notes
- Architect(s): Darling and Pearson, assisted by Harkness and Oxley, Engineers
- Architectural styles: Edwardian, Beaux Arts

Ontario Heritage Act
- Designated: 1990

The Canadian Pacific Building is a 15-storey highrise at 69 Yonge Street in the city's downtown core of Toronto, Ontario, Canada, designed by the architectural firm of Darling and Pearson. When completed in 1913 as corporate headquarters for the Canadian Pacific Railway, it was the tallest building in Canada and the British Empire.

== History ==
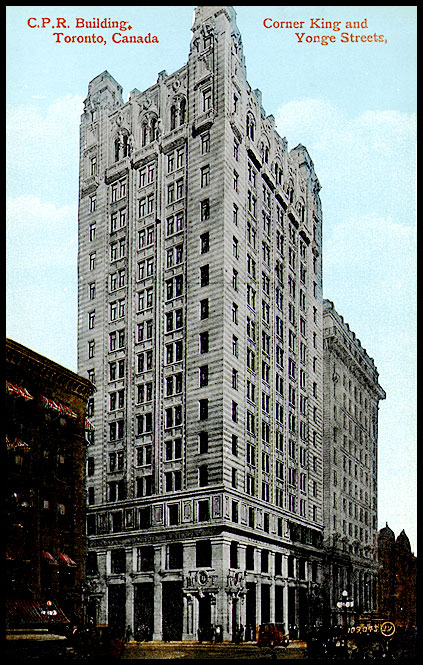
Period post card showing the building upon completion.

The Canadian Pacific Building was erected at a time when "the Canadian Pacific Railway was enjoying its greatest period of prosperity under the leadership of Sir Thomas Shaugnessy". The railway wanted to incorporate various corporate offices around the city in one location. The location contained a ticket office for the convenience of customers, to avoid them having to head down to Union Station to purchase tickets; by 1990 the original marble ticket office had been removed to make way for a drug store. Construction started in 1911 and was completed by 1913. The ground floor contained a two-storey marble lobby and ticket office. Above the ticket office were various other company functions, including the lucrative telegraph business. The railway had plenty of space left in the building available to be leased out to other business tenants. Built in an Edwardian Style, it was a "dramatic change from CPR's Château-style of architecture".

The building was one of four erected at the corner of King and Yonge Streets in Toronto around the same period, all of which still exist (as of 2001). They have since been eclipsed by much taller buildings in the area. The structure featured "cream enamel terra-cotta on four elevations, manufactured by [the] Northwestern Terra Cotta Co. [of] Chicago".

By 1929, its original ornate terracotta exterior proved to be unable to sufficiently withstand Canadian winters. Over the course of one year and a half, under the supervision of its original architects, Darling and Pearson, it was reclad with Indiana limestone from the fourth floor up, with the original granite on the first three floors untouched. The Canadian Pacific Railway (CPR) name no longer adorns the building, but traces of the name still remain on the walls. As of 2023, the faint outline of the former CPR lettering can still be seen on the building.

The building remained in railway hands until it was sold in 1988 to H&R Development, who renovated it. As of 2017, the property was entirely owned by H&R Real Estate Investment (a real estate investment trust); the property had a 100% occupancy rate, offering over 8,000 m^{2} (86,000 ft^{2}) of office space in total.

As of 2023, the unit sits somewhat vacant, with only from 4% to 11% of workers swiping their cards to access the building. With declining office vacancies after the COVID-19 pandemic (mostly due to office workers partly or completely working from home), the owner of the building was looking at "reimagining" the property, turning some space into housing units. This would also help with the chronic shortage of housing facing the city of Toronto post-pandemic.

=== Architecture ===
The 15-storey building was "designed in the Renaissance Revival style according to Beaux-Arts principles". It has a fire-proof steel skeleton, designed with a plinth, a shaft and an attic. On the plinth are Doric piers and cornice, four entrance doors with moulded surrounds and oversized transoms. Finally, we notice clerestory windows. The tall shaft of the building shows balanced fenestration, pilaster strips, and pinnacles. Further up, the attic storey features an arcade of paired windows with balustrades, topped off with a parapet roof decorated at the four corner towers with cupolas.

=== Protection ===
The building is protected under Part IV of the Ontario Heritage Act, designated by the City of Toronto since 1990.
