= Altius Architects =

Altius Architecture, Inc.
- Type: Architectural Practice
- Industry: Architecture, Interior Design
- Founded: 1998
- Headquarters: Toronto, Canada
- Key people: Cathy Garrido(Founder and Partner), Graham Smith(Founder and Partner)
- Number of employees: 25+
- Website: www.altius.net

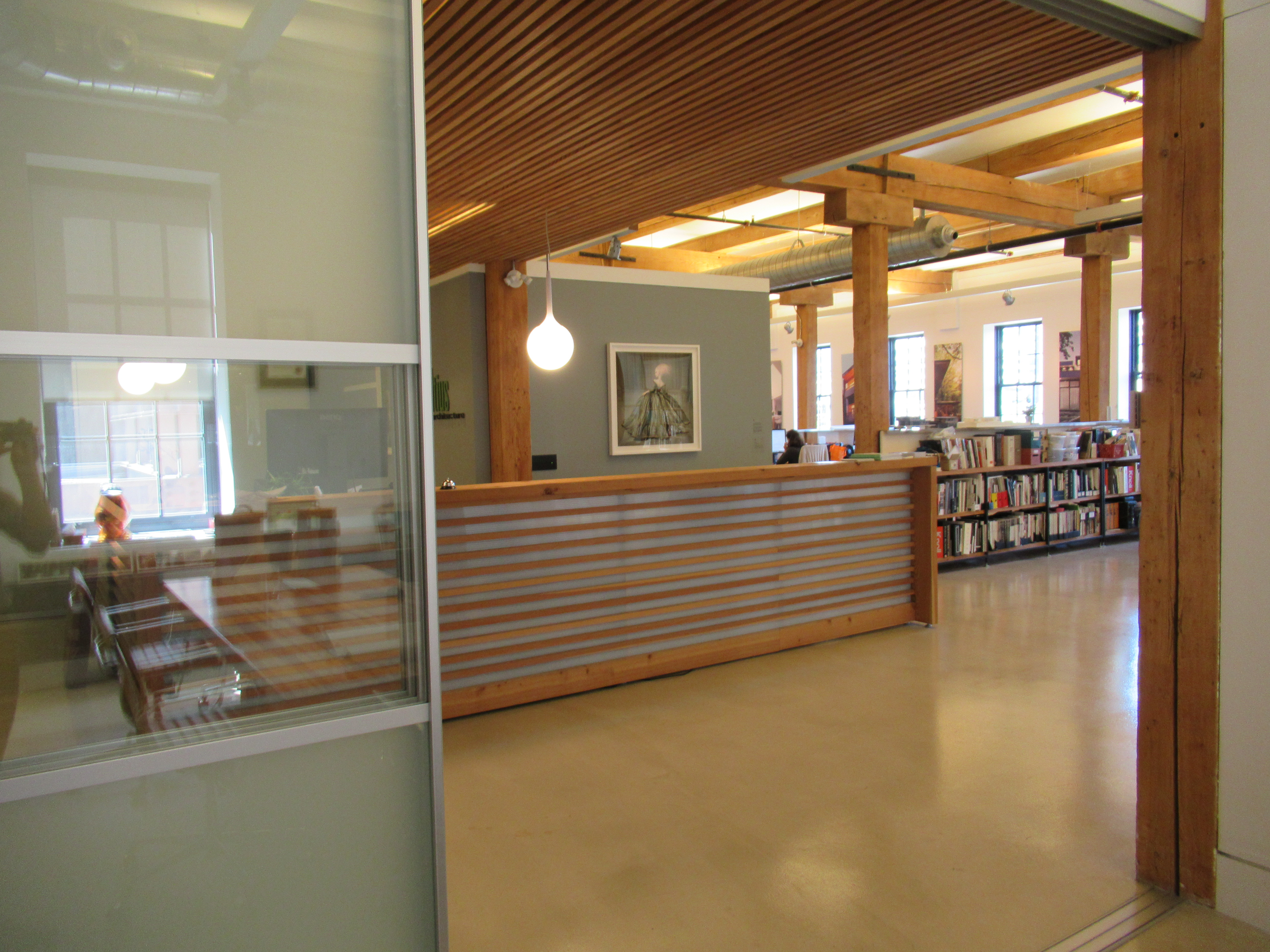
The interior of the Altius Architecture, Inc. office in the Liberty Village neighbourhood of Toronto.

Altius Architecture, Inc. is an architecture and interior design firm based in Toronto, Ontario that designs and constructs custom homes and cottages. The office is involved in projects in Canada, the United States and the Middle East. They practice in a regional and sustainable design process.

== History ==
Altius was founded by four partners who had met as students at the University of Waterloo, School of Architecture, in the 1990s. Altius Design Studio was founded in 1998 and became Altius Architecture Inc in 2002.

The Ontario Association of Architects selected Altius for the 2007 Best Emerging Practice Award, in recognition of their strategies and creativity in a firm that has been in practice for five years or less. In 2007, the three partners of Altius Architecture Inc purchased 49% of Sustain Design Studio and their flagship miniHome, a line of sustainable prefabricated homes.

In 2009, the three partners acquired 100% of Sustain Design Studio and began expanding the miniHome into the California market.

In 2012, Altius participated in the public exhibition Big Enough at the Toronto Harbourfront Centre. The exhibition was investigating the idea of space in the city, by posing the question: How much space do we really need?

== Projects ==
- 168 Ellis Park. Toronto, Canada. Residential. Completed 2006.
- Fawzia Saltan Rehabilitation Institute. Kuwait. Medical Clinic. Completed 2008.
- Parkview Hills Renovation. Toronto, Canada. Residential. Completed 2009.
- Cliff House. Muskoka, Ontario, Canada. Completed 2010.
- Gallery House. Toronto, Canada. Commercial/Residential. Completed 2012.
- Fawzia Saltan Rehabilitation Institute. Kuwait. Medical Clinic. Completed 2012.
- Sandspit Island Prefab Cottage. Muskoka Lake, Ontario. Residential. Completed 2013.
- Sandspit Island Boathouse. Muskoka Lake, Ontario. Residential. Completed 2013.
- Holiday Films Production Offices. Toronto, Canada. Commercial. Completed 2013.
- Condos at Muskoka Bay. Muskoka, Ontario. Multi-Unit Residential. Completed 2014.
- The Solo 40 Modular Prefab Home. Belle River, Ontario. Completed 2014.
- Jones Collumbin Office. Toronto, Canada. Commercial. Completed 2015.
- Arkell Lofts. Guelph, Canada. Multi-Unit Residential. Completed 2015.
- Clinton Street Residence. Toronto, Canada. Residential. Completed 2015.
- Lakeview in the Beach. Toronto, Canada. Residential. Completed 2015.
- Lake of the Woods Bunkie. Toronto, Canada. Residential. Completed 2015.
- Chandos Lake Cottage. Chandos Lake, Ontario. Residential. Completed 2016.
- 192 Grenadier. Toronto, Canada. Residential. Completed 2016.
- Don Mills House. Toronto, Canada. Residential. Completed 2016.
- Summerhill House. Toronto, Canada. Residential. Completed 2016.
- North Toronto House. Toronto, Canada. Residential. Completed 2016.
- Iroquois Bay Cottage. McGregor Bay, Ontario. Residential. Completed 2016.
- Mimico Creek Residence. Toronto, Canada. Completed 2017.
- 9 Lee. Toronto, Canada. Residential. Completed 2017.
- Fawzia Saltan Health Group. Kuwait. Under Construction.

== Awards ==
- 2005 Ontario Association of Architects, Award of Excellence for Multi Unit Residential, for Dunn Avenue Triplex.
- 2007 Ontario Association of Architects, Best Emerging Practice
- 2007 City of Toronto government, Green Toronto Design Award Finalist
- 2008 Canadian Wood Council, Wood Works!, Interior Design Award, for Eels Lake Cottage.
- 2008 Canadian Wood Council, Wood Works!, Architect Wood Advocate Award
- 2011 CanStrcution, Honourable Mention, CANtinuum.
- 2014 ARIDO, Award of Merit, for Thorncrest House.
- 2015 houzz, Best of houzz 2015 Award.

== Publications ==
- "Kitchen Designed Around Coffee Maker in Etobicoke Home Rebuild", The Globe and Mail, February 15, 2018.
- "Etobicoke House Rebuild Sprints Into Landscaping Season", The Globe and Mail, April 13, 2018.
- "Beautiful Stouffville Residence Pays Homage to Farm Typology", The Toronto Star, March 15, 2018.
- "Film, Architecture Programs a Focus of Doors Open 2018", UrbanToronto.ca, May 10, 2018.
- "Toronto's Doors Open Presents a Glimpse into Leading Design Studios", Canadian Interiors, May 14, 2018.
- "A Toronto-Based Firm Breathes New Life Into a Victorian's Interior", Dwell, January 11, 2017.
- "The Complicated Art of Simplicity", National Post, January 28, 2017.
- "Raising the Bar", Construction in Focus Magazine, February 24, 2017.
- "How a Young Couple Turned their Quirky, Charming Annex House into a Light-Filled Sanctuary", Toronto Life, April 11, 2017.
- "Out With The Old, In With The Framing", The Globe and Mail, April 13, 2017.
- "Altius Architecture Designed A Bright And Modern House Renovation", Contemporist, June 13, 2017.
- "Raise the Flat Roof", The Globe and Mail, June 15, 2017.
- "Everything Hits At Once", The Globe and Mail, August 10, 2017.
- "In Leaside, An Exercise in Good Design", Designlines Magazine, Fall 2017.
- "A Wall Runs Through It", The Globe and Mail, October 5, 2017.
- "Grenadier House", Design Source Guide, October 26, 2017.
- "Steep slope? No problem", The Globe and Mail, February 15, 2018.
- "Nested in High Park", National Post, August 12, 2017.
- "Modern Homes Rankle Homeowners In Established Neighbourhoods, But Do They Have To?", National Post, February 17, 2016.
- "Dramatic Before-and-After Reno Creates Modern Hilltop Retreat From Faux Roman Villa in King", National Post, March 21, 2015.
- "A New Model", Modern Builder Magazine, April 2016.
- "Rustic vision: A Cottage Competition Stirs Grand Ideas", The Globe and Mail, February 12, 2015.
