= Branch plant economy =

A branch plant economy is an economy that hosts many branch plants (i.e. factories or firms near the base of a supply chain/command chain), but does not host headquarters. In particular, the term was used in arguments that countries must develop independent companies, as a form of economic nationalism, to create better jobs and avoid having managerial positions filled only by corporate workers from outside the country.

The term was used in the 1970s to describe Canadian reliance on US headquartered corporations or Scottish reliance on English-headquartered corporations but may have fallen out of mainstream use. Some opinion pieces still use the terminology to decry reliance on outside states, especially with regard to Canada’s relationship with the United States.
