= Gordon–Van Tine Company Historic District =

Historic district in Iowa, United States

- Gordon–Van Tine Company; Historic District
- U.S. National Register of Historic Places
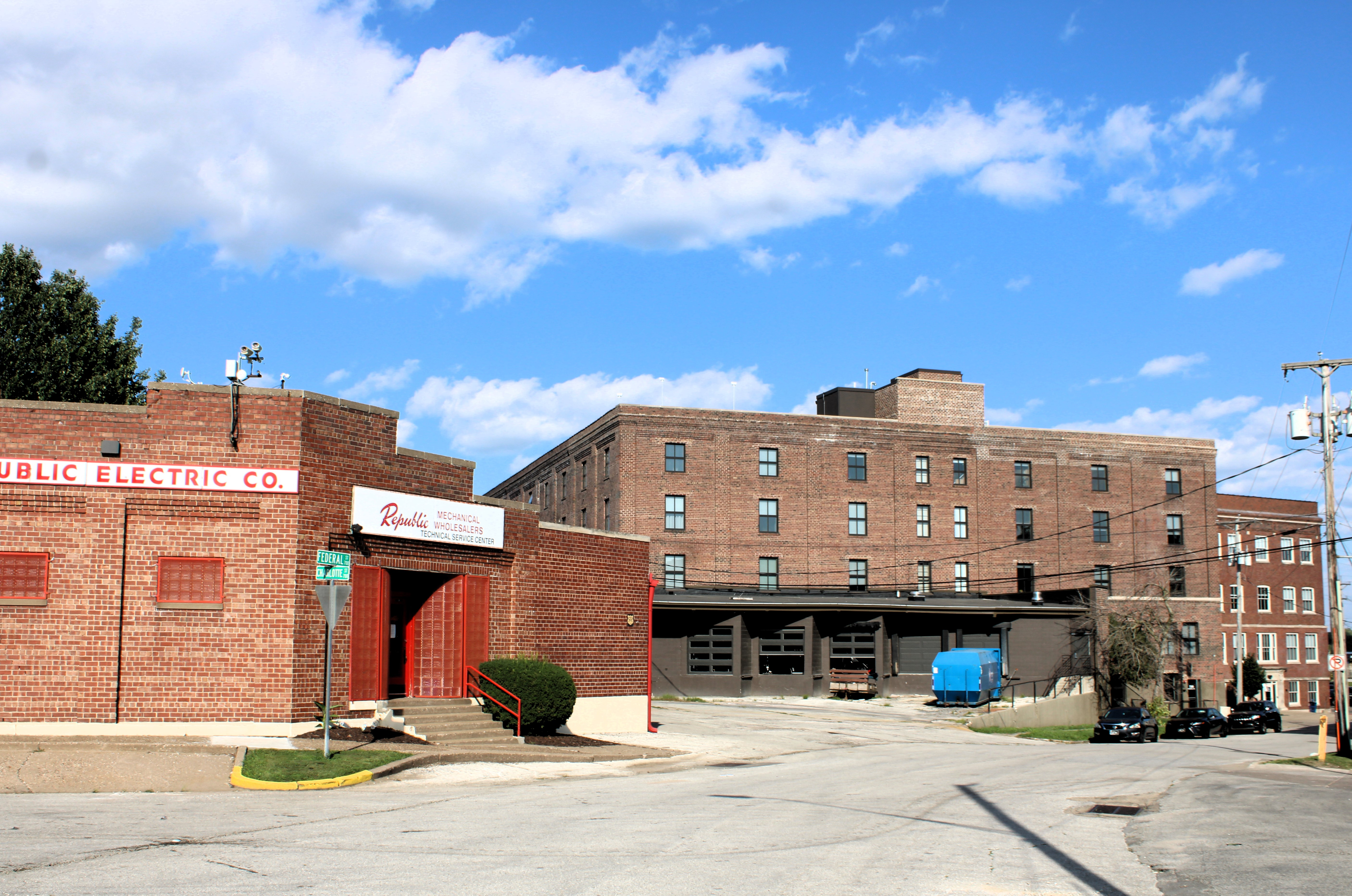
- Gordon–Van Tine Company Historic District in 2023

- Location within Iowa Location within the United States
- Interactive map showing the location of Gordon-Van Tine Company Historic District
- Location: 736 Federal & 737 Charlotte Sts., Davenport, Iowa
- Coordinates: 41°31′31.7″N 90°33′48.7″W
- Area: 1.9 acres (0.77 ha)
- NRHP reference No.: 100000718
- Added to NRHP: March 7, 2017

The Gordon–Van Tine Company Historic District, also known as the U.N. Roberts and Company Buildings, is a nationally recognized historic district located east of downtown Davenport, Iowa, United States. It was listed on the National Register of Historic Places in 2017. At the time of its nomination it consisted of four resources, all contributing buildings. The Gordon–Van Tine Company manufactured pre-cut, mail-order homes in this facility, beginning around 1916.

== History ==
Gordon–Van Tine was incorporated as a subsidiary of the U.N. Roberts lumber company in 1907. Originally, they were located in several buildings in the 300 block of Harrison Street. They began by selling construction materials to builders, but by 1910 they offered house plans and became one of the first companies in the United States to offer fully pre-cut houses. The customer could choose from a variety of floor plans, finishes, design features, and equipment choices. The lumber for the houses came from company mills in Davenport; Chehalis, Washington; St. Louis, Missouri; and from one of two southern lumber yards, first in Louisiana, and then in Hattiesburg, Mississippi.

The company sold an estimated 54,000 homes under the Gordon–Van Tine name, and provided the lumber for another 20,000 to Montgomery Ward company, who contracted with Gordon-Van Tine to supply materials for their identical line of Wardway homes, beginning in 1917. While better known for their houses, Gordon-Van Tine also provided the plans and materials for pre-cut barns and other farm structures. Gordon-Van Tine remained in operation until 1946, when it was sold to a Cincinnati salvage firm that liquidated it just as the post–World War II housing boom was beginning.

== Historic District ==
Building #1 is a four-story, rectangular, brick structure. It is the more ornate of the four buildings and the only one that has a defining architectural style, Neoclassical. The building features a limestone foundation, a main entrance with a stone surround and a simple limestone cornice, a stone water table across the top of the first floor windows, a stone string course between the second and third floor windows, and a simple classical brick entablature with a brick and stone cornice. The first three floors were built between 1908 and 1909. The fourth floor was added sometime before 1923. The building served as an office building for the U.N. Roberts Company and Gordon–Van Tine.

Building #2 is a five-story, rectangular, reinforced concrete structure with brick curtain walls. Completed in 1910, it features brick pilasters between the bays on the third through fifth floors. It is capped with a simple brick classical cornice. A large two-story addition was added to the east side of the building in 1965. A differentiation in color of the bricks marks the two sections. Because it was built after Gordon–Van Tine was liquidated it has no ties to the company. Building #1 and Building #2 were linked by two skywalks at one time.

Building #3 is linked to the east side of Building #1 by a hyphen. Originally the two buildings were separate. It is not known when this building was completed, but a photograph taken sometime between 1915 and 1920 shows it already in place. This single-story brick structure originally served as a four-car garage.

Building #4 is a long, narrow, single-story, brick structure on the north side of the property. It originally served as a lumber shed. It features large doors on the street side to load lumber onto trucks and loading docks on the opposite side of the building that served the railroad tracks between it and the factory. The building was completed in sections. The two middle sections are the oldest and are believed to have been completed before 1920. The two sections on the west side of the building were completed by 1932 and the two section on the east side of the building sometime before 1967. The four older sections bear a resemblance to each other while the two newest sections do not.

Two of the buildings in the historic district have been transformed into an apartment complex. The former office building houses 15 apartments, and the former factory/warehouse houses 98. Commercial retail space was also created in the facility. Revitalization efforts for the $35 million project were begun in 2000 and completed in the summer of 2019.

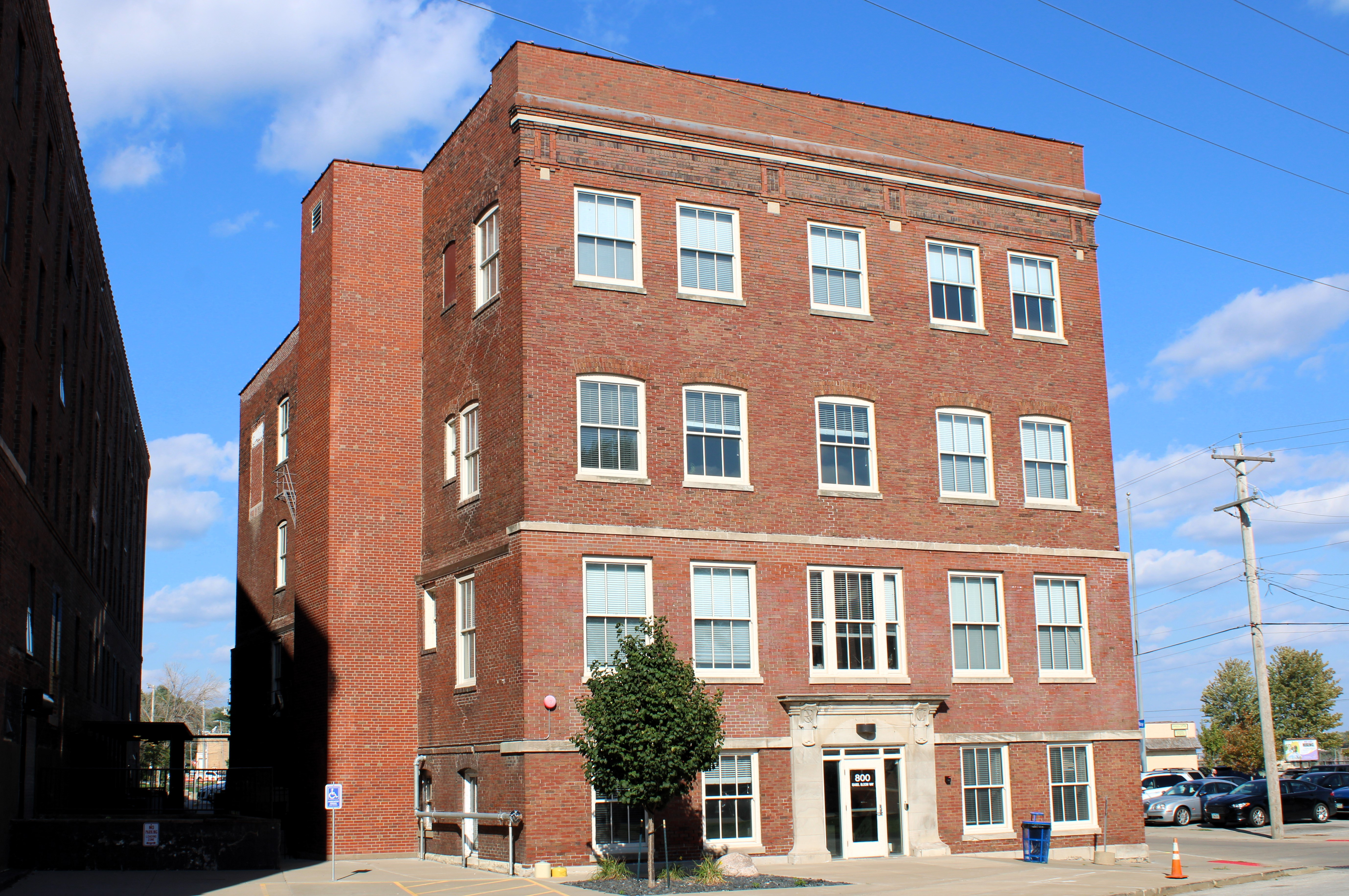
Building #1

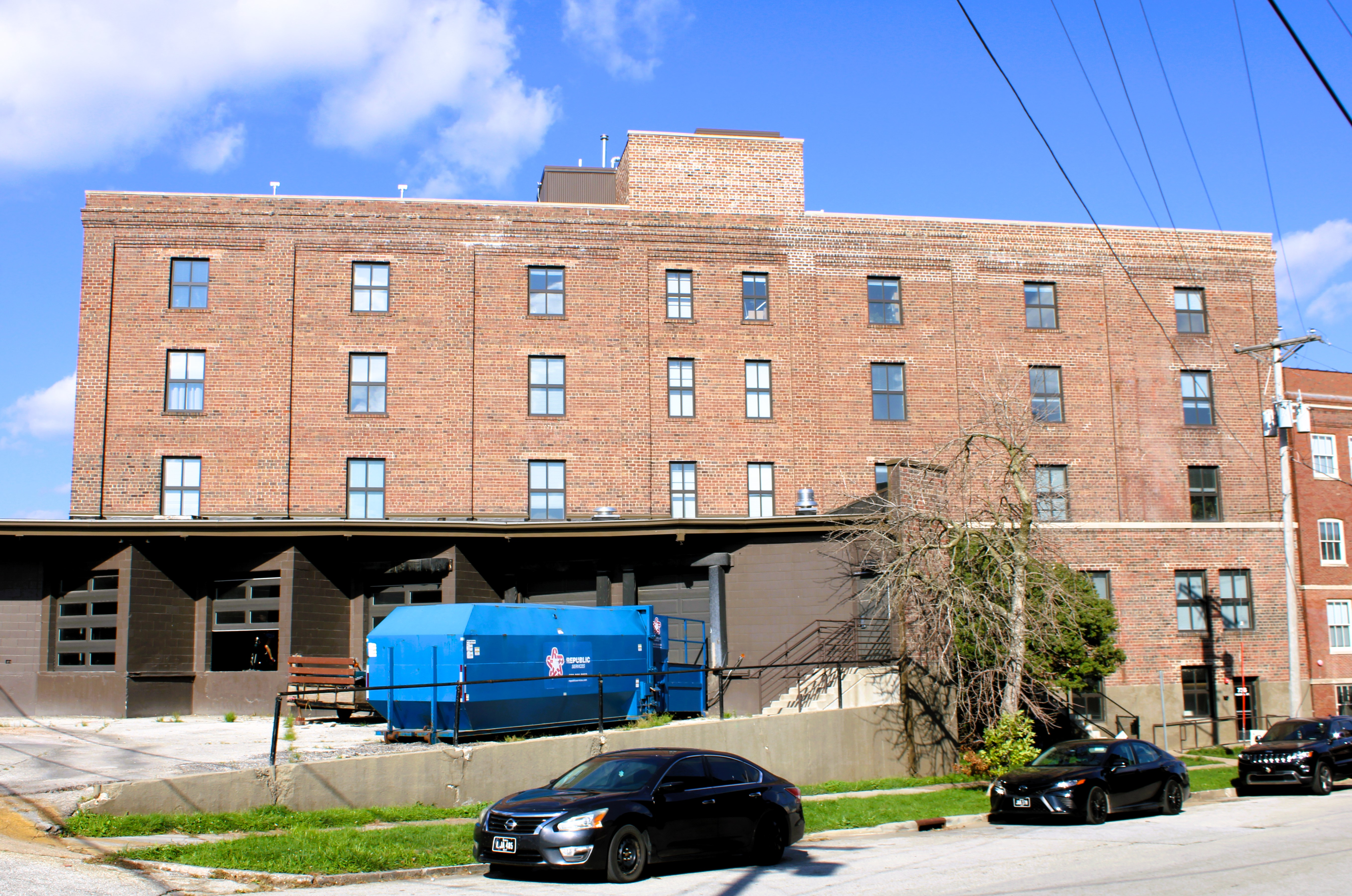
Building #2

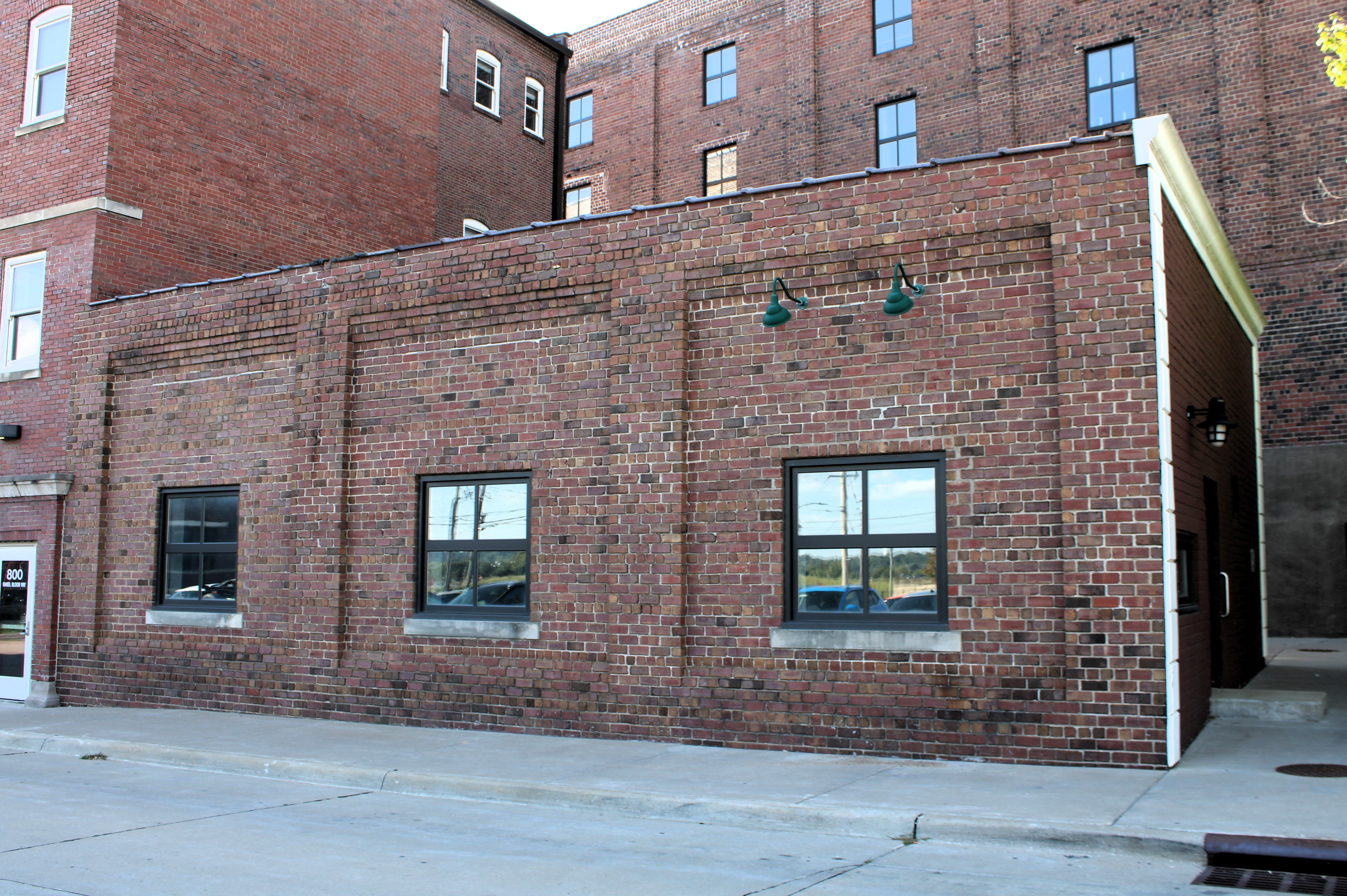
Building #3

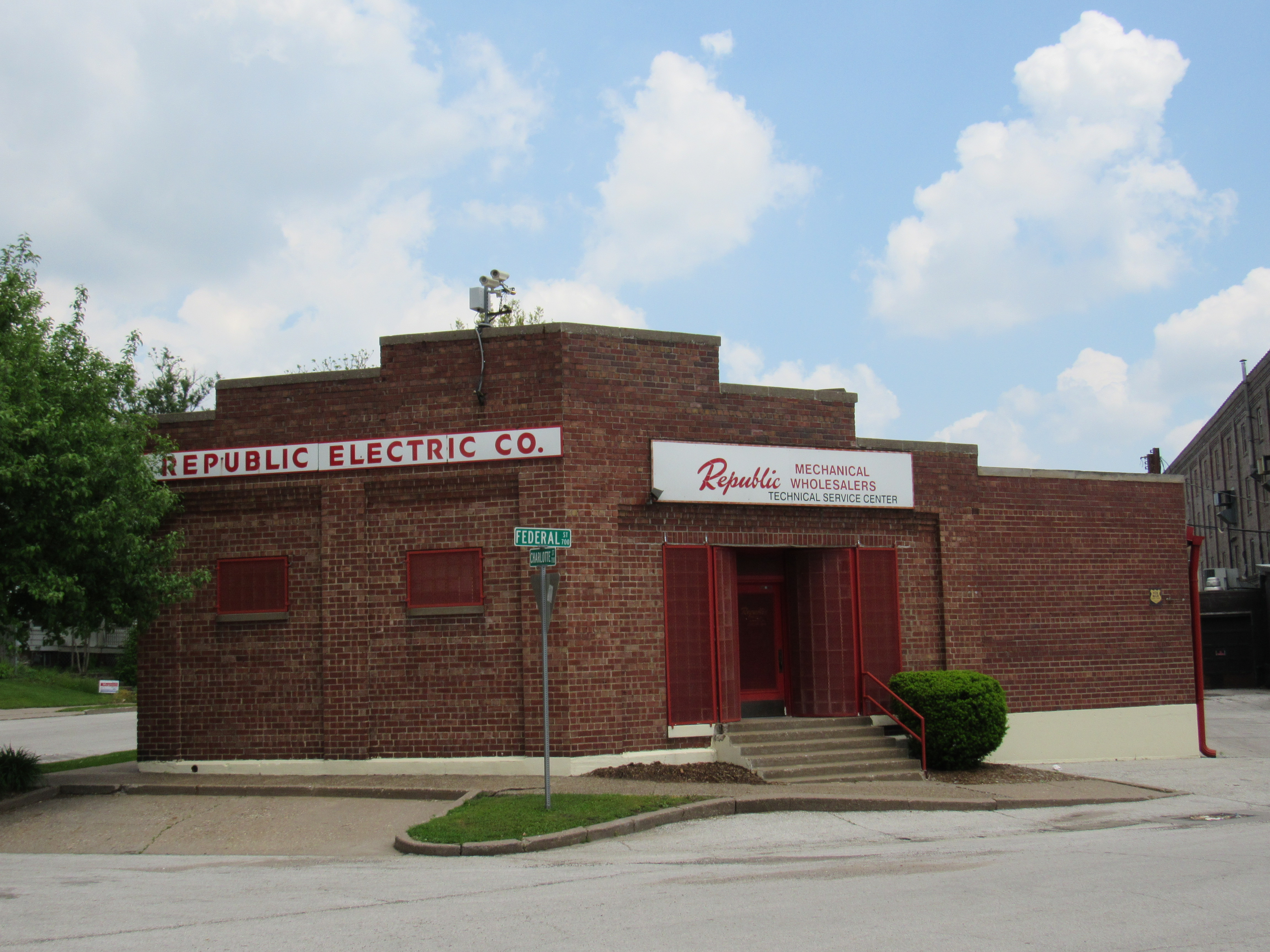
Building #4

== Gordon-Van Tine in St. Louis, Missouri ==
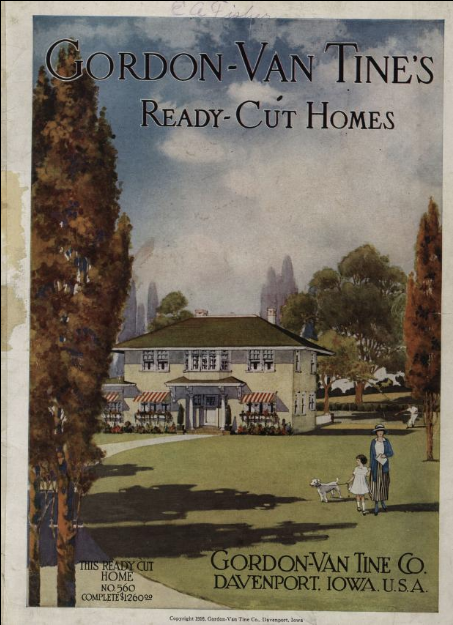
Cover of the 1916 Gordon-Van Tine Ready-Cut Homes catalog

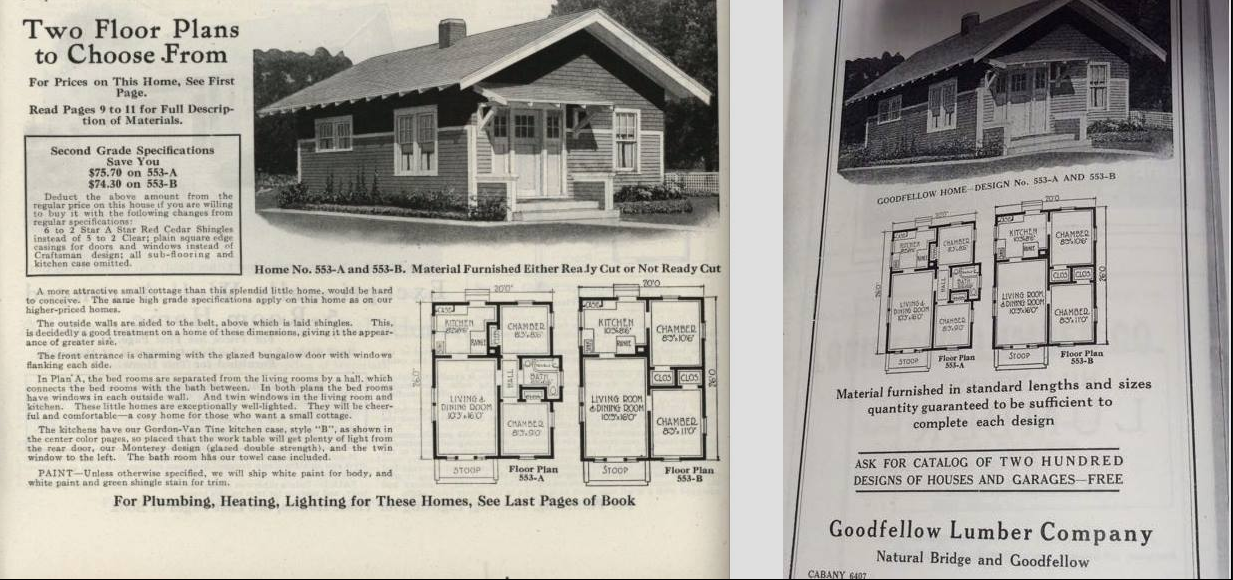
Side-by-side images of a kit model offered in the Gordon-Van Tine 1921 catalog, and an advertisement by Goodfellow Lumber Company, showing the same model

The Gordon-Van Tine company advertised that one of their major lumberyards was in St. Louis, Missouri. According to articles in old Lumberman journals and newsletters, that lumber yard did not use the Gordon-Van Tine moniker, but rather operated, first, under the name Funck Lumber. A 1915 issue of Mississippi Valley Lumberman newsletter references the use of the Funk (sic) Lumber yard by Gordon-Van Tine, and the January 18, 1919 issue of The Southern Lumberman, discussing the retirement of George W. Funck, discusses the ownership of the Funck Lumberyard by Davenport's U.N. Roberts lumber company (parent company to Gordon-Van Tine). Gordon-Van Tine offered its first "Ready-Cut" catalog in 1916, and that year coincides with the year that the St. Louis Funck Lumber Company re-tooled their business to add a wood-working plant for the manufacture of "ready cut" houses, as mentioned in the March 13, 1916 Iron Age lumberman journal. According to the above-referenced 1919 newsletter article about the retirement of president George W. Funck, that lumber yard was re-named Goodfellow Lumber, upon Funck's retirement. The Funck / Goodfellow Lumberyard was located near the corner of Goodfellow and Natural Bridge Roads, at 5700 Natural Bridge Road, in the city of St. Louis, in what is now the 63120 zip code. St. Louis City directories and St. Louis newspapers of the era, include advertisements for the company, giving this location. The addition of the "ready-cut" manufacturing section of the lumberyard was a boon for business at Funck Lumberyard, which saw its business revenues triple in 1918 and 1919, according to a January 1920 Southern Lumberman journal article that mentions the change of the company's name to Goodfellow Lumber.

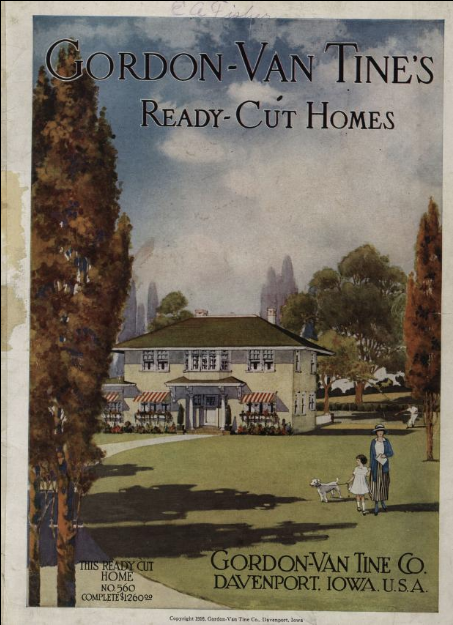
Cover of the 1916 Gordon-Van Tine Ready-Cut Homes catalog

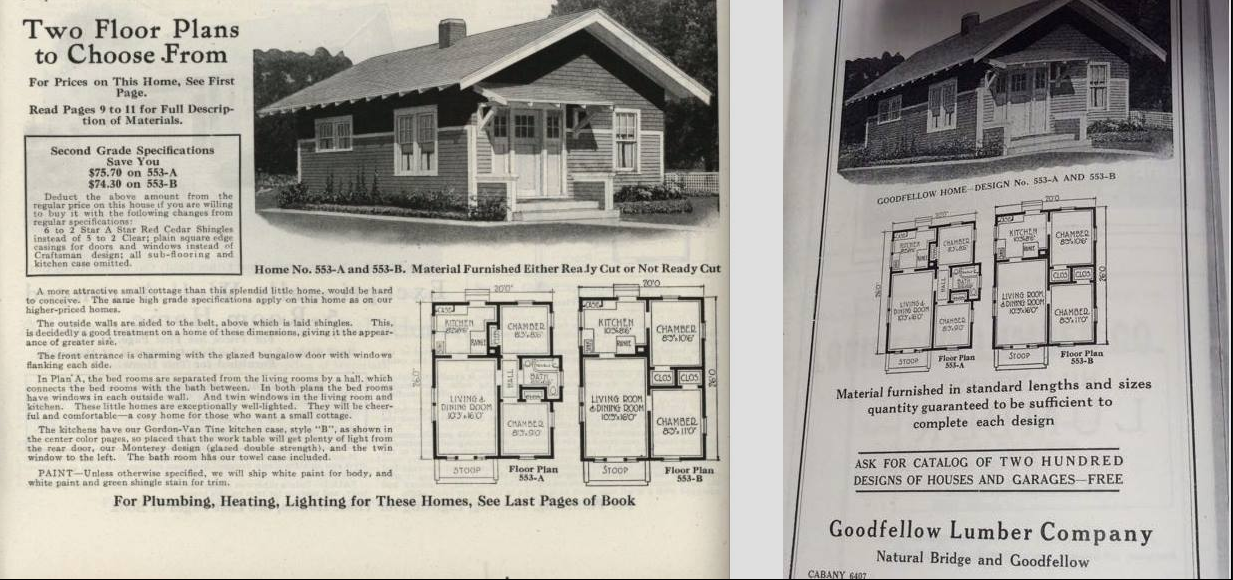
Side-by-side images of a kit model offered in the Gordon-Van Tine 1921 catalog, and an advertisement by Goodfellow Lumber Company, showing the same model
