= Edmund Alexander Parkes =

English military physician

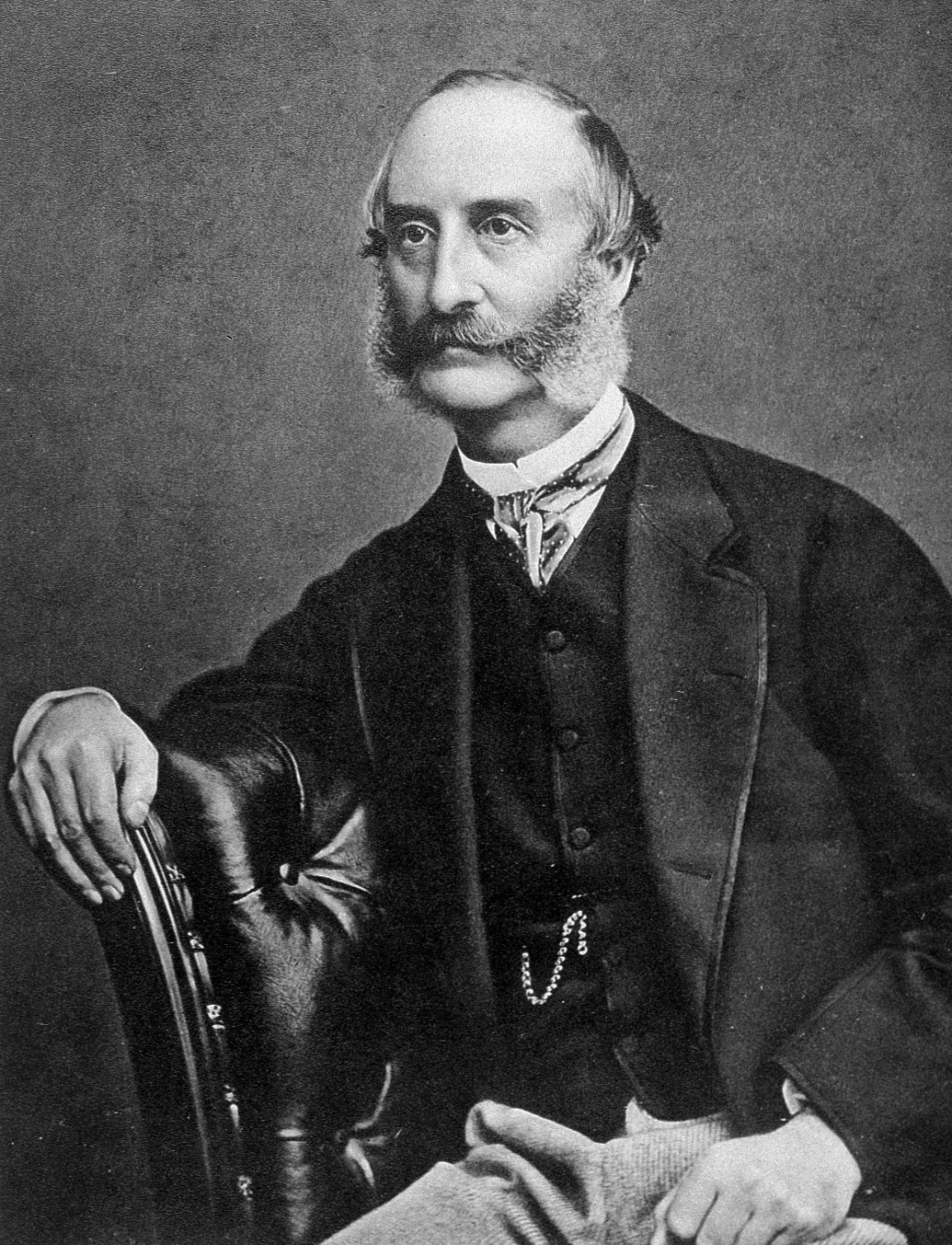
Edmund Alexander Parkes

Edmund Alexander Parkes (29 December 1819 – 15 March 1876) was an English physician, known as a hygienist, particularly in the military context.

== Early life ==
Parkes was born at Bloxham in Oxfordshire, the son of William Parkes, of the Marble-yard, Warwick, and Frances, daughter of Thomas Byerley. Parkes was educated at Christ's Hospital, London, and received his professional training at University College London and Hospital. In 1841 he graduated M.B. at the University of London; in 1840 he had become a member of the Royal College of Surgeons. At an early age he worked in the laboratory of his uncle, Anthony Todd Thomson, and for Thomson he later lectured on materia medica and medical jurisprudence.

In April 1842 Thomson was gazetted assistant-surgeon to the 84th (York and Lancaster) Regiment, and at age 22 embarked with it for India, serving in Madras and Moulmein. During this period he obtained clinical experience of tropical diseases, particularly of dysentery, hepatitis, and cholera. In September 1845 he retired from the army, and, returning home, practised in Upper Seymour Street, and then Harley Street; but he never gained a large practice. In 1846 he graduated M.D. at the University of London. In 1849 he was elected special professor of clinical medicine at University College, and physician to University College Hospital. At the opening of one of the sessions of the college he delivered an introductory lecture on Self-training by the Medical Student.

== Renkioi Hospital ==
In 1855 he was selected by the government to travel to Turkey to select a site for, organise, and superintend a large civil hospital to relieve the pressure on the hospitals at Scutari during the Crimean War. He selected Renkioi, on the Asiatic bank of the Dardanelles, and remained there until the end of the war in 1856. This was the site of the 1,000 patient prefabricated timber Renkioi Hospital, designed by Isambard Kingdom Brunel, and set up by William Eassie Jnr, whose father's Gloucester Docks-based firm had constructed it. The hospital was outside the orbit of Florence Nightingale, and had a nursing staff selected by Parkes and Sir James Clark, including as a volunteer Parkes's sister.

== Later life ==
In 1860 an Army Medical School was established at Fort Pitt, Chatham, and Parkes, who had been consulted on the scheme by Sidney Herbert as Secretary of State for War, accepted the chair of hygiene. University College appointed him emeritus professor, and a marble bust of Parkes was placed in the museum.

At the Army Medical School at Chatham Parkes organised a system of instruction. In 1863 the school was transferred to the Royal Victoria Hospital, Netley. Parkes was constantly engaged in protracted official inquiries connected with hygiene. He was a member of General Henry Eyre's "Pack Committee", which substituted the valise equipment for the cumbrous knapsack. In 1863 he was appointed by the crown to the General Medical Council, in succession to Sir Charles Hastings. He was a member of the council of the Royal Society, where he was elected a Fellow in 1861; and he was elected to the senate of the University of London.

== Death, memorials and legacy ==
In 1850 Parkes had married Mary Jane Chattock of Solihull. She died, after severe suffering, in 1873, without issue. Parkes died on 15 March 1876 aged 56, at his residence, Sydney Cottage, Bitterne, near Southampton, from tuberculosis, and he was buried by the side of his wife at Solihull.

Several memorials were established in Parkes's memory. At University College, London, a museum of hygiene was founded, of which the original trustees were Sir William Jenner, Edward Sieveking, and George Vivian Poore. It was opened in 1877, and was formally incorporated under license of the Board of Trade; it was moved in 1882 from University College to new premises in Margaret Street, Cavendish Square. This Parkes Museum amalgamated with the Sanitary Institute in 1888, but retained its name; in 1956 it became the Health Exhibition Centre (opened 1961), closed in 1971 when the Royal Society for the Promotion of Health moved away.

At Netley, a portrait of Parkes, by Messrs. Barraud & Jerrard, was in the anteroom of the army medical staff mess; a triennial prize of seventy-five guineas, and a large gold medal bearing Parkes's portrait, was established for the best essay on a subject connected with hygiene, the prize to be open to the medical officers of the army, navy, and Indian service of executive rank, on full pay; and a bronze medal, also bearing the portrait of Parkes, was instituted, to be awarded at the close of each session to the best student in hygiene.

== Works ==
=== The Manual ===
In 1864 Parkes published the first edition of the Manual of Practical Hygiene; it reached during his lifetime a fourth edition, an eighth edition in 1891, and was translated into many languages. It used a traditional airs, waters and places structure, going back to Hippocrates, and this persisted for a generation. In 1896 it was revised by James Lane Notter (1843–1923) and R. H. Firth, in a version that was a standard, through six editions, for military hygiene until 1905.

=== Other works ===
Parkes took as the subject of his thesis for M.D. the connection between dysentery and Indian hepatitis. The Remarks on the Dysentery and Hepatitis of India, contained advanced views on the pathology of the diseases. In 1847 he published On Asiatic and Algide Cholera, written mainly in India, where he had seen two epidemics; and in the following year a paper on Intestinal Discharges in Cholera, and another on the Early Cases of Cholera in London. In 1849 he wrote on Diseases of the Heart in the Medical Times, to which he became frequent contributor.

In 1851 Parkes completed and edited Anthony Todd Thomson's Practical Treatise on Diseases Affecting the Skin and in 1852 he published a paper on the action of Liquor Potassæ in Health and Disease. He also at that time wrote much for the Medical Times. From 1852 to 1855 he edited the British and Foreign Medico-Chirurgical Review. In 1855 he delivered the Gulstonian lectures on pyrexia at the Royal College of Physicians; they were published in the Medical Times of that year. The results of his hospital administration in Renkioi were recorded in his published report.

In 1860 Parkes published The Composition of the Urine in Health and Disease, and under the Action of Remedies. He started in 1861, at the request of Sir James Brown Gibson, an annual Review of the Progress of Hygiene, which appeared in the Army Medical Department Blue-Book, to 1875. In three papers in the Proceedings of the Royal Society (two in 1867, and one in 1871) he described the Effects of Diet and Exercise on the Elimination of Nitrogen. He confirmed independently the observations of Adolf Eugen Fick and Johannes Wislicenus, against Justus Liebig's theory that muscular work implies the destruction of muscular tissue by oxidation. Parkes suggested that the elimination of urea is not dependent on the amount of muscular exercise, but on the consumption of nitrogenous food; and that muscular tissue does not consume itself as a fuel doing work. His experiments on the effects of alcohol on the human body (in which he was assisted by Cyprian Wollowicz) were in three papers (in 1870, 1872, and 1874), on the Effects of Brandy on the Body-temperature, Pulse, and Respiration of Healthy Men; and he completed a Comparative Inquiry into the Effects of Coffee, Extract of Meat, and Alcohol on Men marching. He also published a report, on the evidence collected during the Ashanti campaign, on the value of a spirit ration for troops.

In 1868 Parkes published a Scheme of Medical Tuition in The Lancet (later republished and dedicated to Sir George Burrows). He placed great value on the practical study of chemistry and physiology in the laboratory, on the teaching of the methods of physical examination before starting clinical work, and on the utilisation of the out-patient department for teaching purposes. He argued the inefficiency of the examinations of the licensing bodies.

Parkes contributed freely to medical periodicals. He also published his inaugural lecture at the Army Medical School, entitled On the Care of Old Age (1862). He delivered the Croonian lectures before the College of Physicians in March 1871, selecting for his subject Some Points connected with the Elimination of Nitrogen from the Human Body. For some years he delivered a short course of lectures on hygiene to the corps of Royal Engineers at Chatham. In 1871 he made, with John Scott Burdon-Sanderson, a report on the sanitary state of Liverpool. On 26 June 1876 Sir William Jenner delivered before the Royal College of Physicians the Harveian oration which Parkes was engaged in writing at the time of his death.

The last work from Parkes's pen was a manual On Personal Care of Health, which was published posthumously by the Society for Promoting Christian Knowledge. A revised edition of his work on Public Health, which was a concise sketch of the sanitary considerations connected with the land, with cities, villages, houses, and individuals, was edited by Sir William Aitken, in 1876.

== Recognition ==
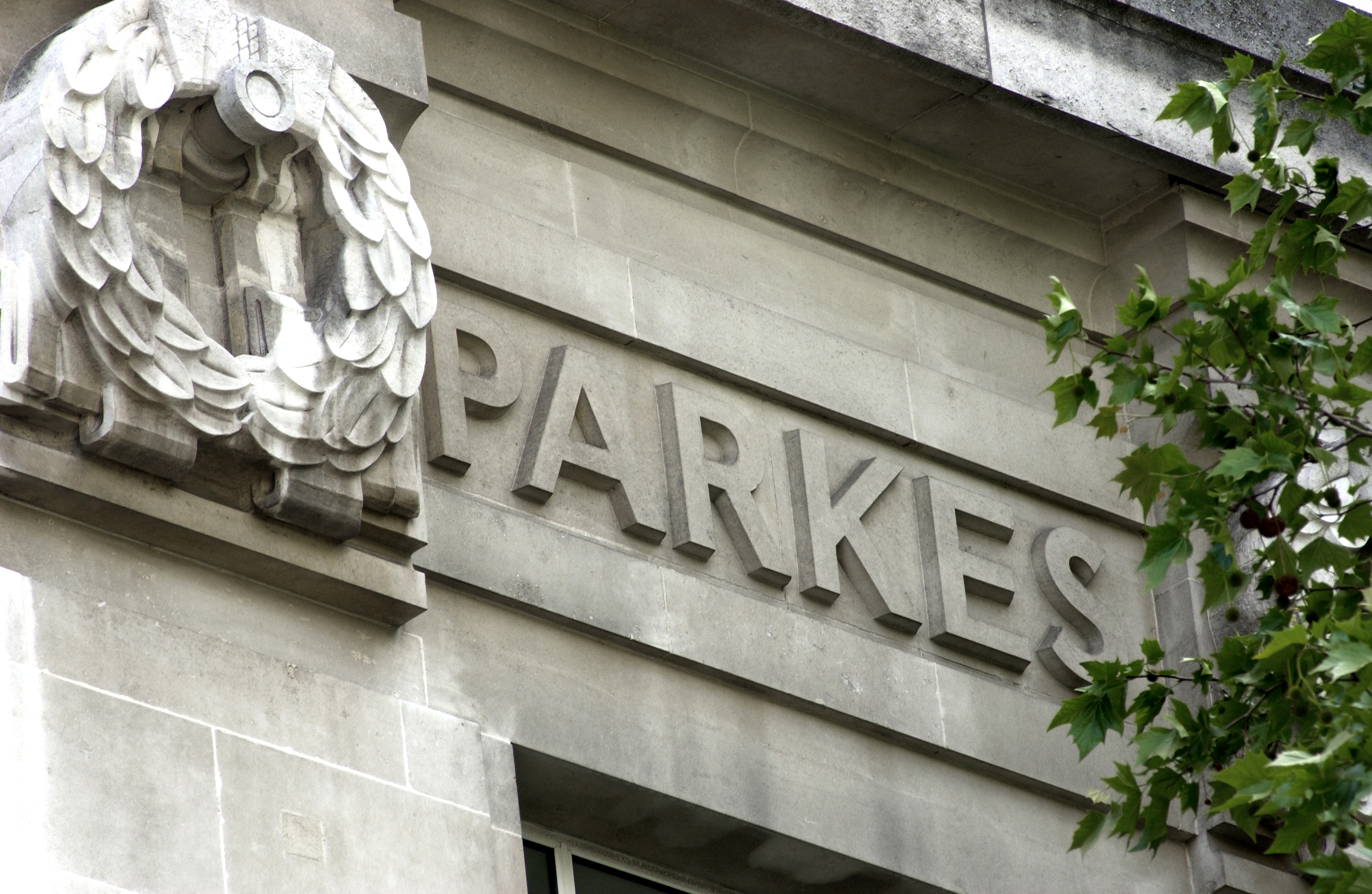
Edmund Parkes' name as it appears on the LSHTM Frieze

Parkes' name features on the Frieze of the London School of Hygiene & Tropical Medicine. Twenty-three names of public health and tropical medicine pioneers were chosen to feature on the School building in Keppel Street when it was constructed in 1926.
