= Katherine Thomson (English writer) =

English writer and historian

Katherine Thomson (1797–1862) (née Byerley, also as Mrs A. T. Thomson, pseudonym Grace Wharton) was an English writer, known as a novelist and historian.

== Life ==
She was the seventh daughter of Thomas Byerley of Etruria, Staffordshire, a nephew by marriage and sometime partner and manager of the pottery works of Josiah Wedgwood. Her sister was Maria Byerley who founded a school. She married, in 1820, the physician Anthony Todd Thomson, as his second wife. During their residence in London, for some of the time at Hinde Street, Marylebone, she and her husband assembled an artistic and literary circle, among their earlier friends being Thomas Campbell (poet), David Wilkie (artist), James Mackintosh, Francis Jeffrey, Lord Jeffrey, and Lord Cockburn. Later, in Welbeck Street, they saw much of Thackeray, Robert Browning, and also of Edward Bulwer-Lytton, who became a close friend.

After her husband's death in 1849 she lived abroad for some years. In 1860, she suffered the drowning of her son, John Cockburn Thomson. She returned to London, and died at Dover on 17 December 1862.

== Works ==
=== Biographies ===
At her husband's suggestion, Thomson began biographical compilation, starting with a brief Life of Wolsey for the Society for the Diffusion of Useful Knowledge, in 1824. She developed anecdotal biography, as used by Isaac D'Israeli, John Heneage Jesse, and Agnes Strickland. It gave her material for a series of historical novels, anticipating those of Emma Marshall.

Thomson's main historical and biographical compilations were:

- Memoirs of the Court of Henry the Eighth, London, 1826, 2 vols.
- Memoirs of the Life of Sir Walter Ralegh, 1830, (two American editions).
- Memoirs of Sarah, Duchess of Marlborough, and of the Court of Queen Anne, 1838, 2 vols.
- Memoirs of the Jacobites of 1715 and 1745, 1845 and 1846, 3 vols. Together with notices of some minor actors, this contains lives of John Erskine, Earl of Mar; James Radclyffe, 3rd Earl of Derwentwater; Donald Cameron of Lochiel; William Maxwell, 5th Earl of Nithsdale; William Gordon, 6th Viscount of Kenmure; William Murray, Marquess of Tullibardine; Rob Roy; Simon Fraser, 11th Lord Lovat; Lord George Murray; Flora Macdonald; and William Boyd, 4th Earl of Kilmarnock.
- Memoirs of Viscountess Sundon, Mistress of the Robes to Queen Caroline, including Letters from the most celebrated Persons of her Time, 1847, 2 vols.; 1850, 2 vols. This work was criticised for inaccuracies, in the Quarterly Review.
- Recollections of Literary Characters and Celebrated Places, 1854, 2 vols., chapters of anecdotal topography which had originally appeared in Bentley's Miscellany and Fraser's Magazine, under the signature "A Middle-aged Man".
- Life and Times of George Villiers, Duke of Buckingham, 1860, 3 vols.
- ‘Celebrated Friendships,’ 1861, 2 vols. This contains chapters on John Evelyn and Robert Boyle; Henry Howard, Earl of Surrey and Thomas Wyatt (poet); Marie-Antoinette and Marie Thérèse Louise of Savoy, Princesse de Lamballe; Kenelm Digby and Anthony van Dyck; Philip Sidney and Fulke Greville, 1st Baron Brooke; Samuel Taylor Coleridge and Charles Lamb; François Fénelon and Jeanne Guyon; William Cowper and Mary Unwin; David Garrick and Kitty Clive; and Edward Hyde, 1st Earl of Clarendon and Lucius Cary, 2nd Viscount Falkland.

=== Novels ===
Mrs. Thomson also wrote:

- Constance (novel), 1833, 3 vols.
- Rosabel, 1835.
- Lady Annabella, 1837.
- Anne Boleyn, 1842, several editions.
- Widows and Widowers, 1842, several editions.
- Ragland Castle, 1843.
- White Mask, 1844.
- The Chevalier, 1844 and 1857.
- Tracey; or the Apparition, 1847.
- Carew Ralegh, 1857.
- Court Secrets, 1857, dealing with the story of Caspar Hauser.
- Faults on Both Sides, 1858.

=== Co-authorship ===
Under the pseudonym of Grace Wharton she was joint author with her son, John Cockburn Thomson, of

- The Queens of Society, 1860, 2 vols., 3rd ed. 1867; short biographies of Sarah, Duchess of Marlborough, Madame Roland, Lady Mary Wortley Montagu, Georgiana, Duchess of Devonshire, Letitia Elizabeth Landon (L.E.L.), Madame de Sevigne, Sydney, Lady Morgan, Jane Gordon, Duchess of Gordon, Madame Recamier, Mary Hervey, Madame de Stael, Mrs Thrale, Lady Caroline Lamb, Anne Seymour Damer, Marie Anne de Vichy-Chamrond, marquise du Deffand, Elizabeth Montagu, Mary Herbert, Countess of Pembroke, Françoise d'Aubigné, Marquise de Maintenon.
- The Wits and Beaux of Society, 1860, 2 vols., 2nd ed. revised 1861; and
- The Literature of Society, 1862, 2 vols.

The Byerley family were descended from Robert Byerley (1660–1714), a Member of Parliament; he married Mary, daughter of Philip Wharton and great-niece of Philip Wharton, 4th Baron Wharton. This relationship was the source of the pseudonyms taken by Katherine Thomson and her son.

== Family ==
Her marriage produced three sons, including Henry William Thomson, and five daughters.

== Notes ==
Attribution

This article incorporates text from a publication now in the public domain: "Thomson, Katharine". Dictionary of National Biography. London: Smith, Elder & Co. 1885–1900.
