= Hugh William Williams =

English landscape painter (1773–1829)

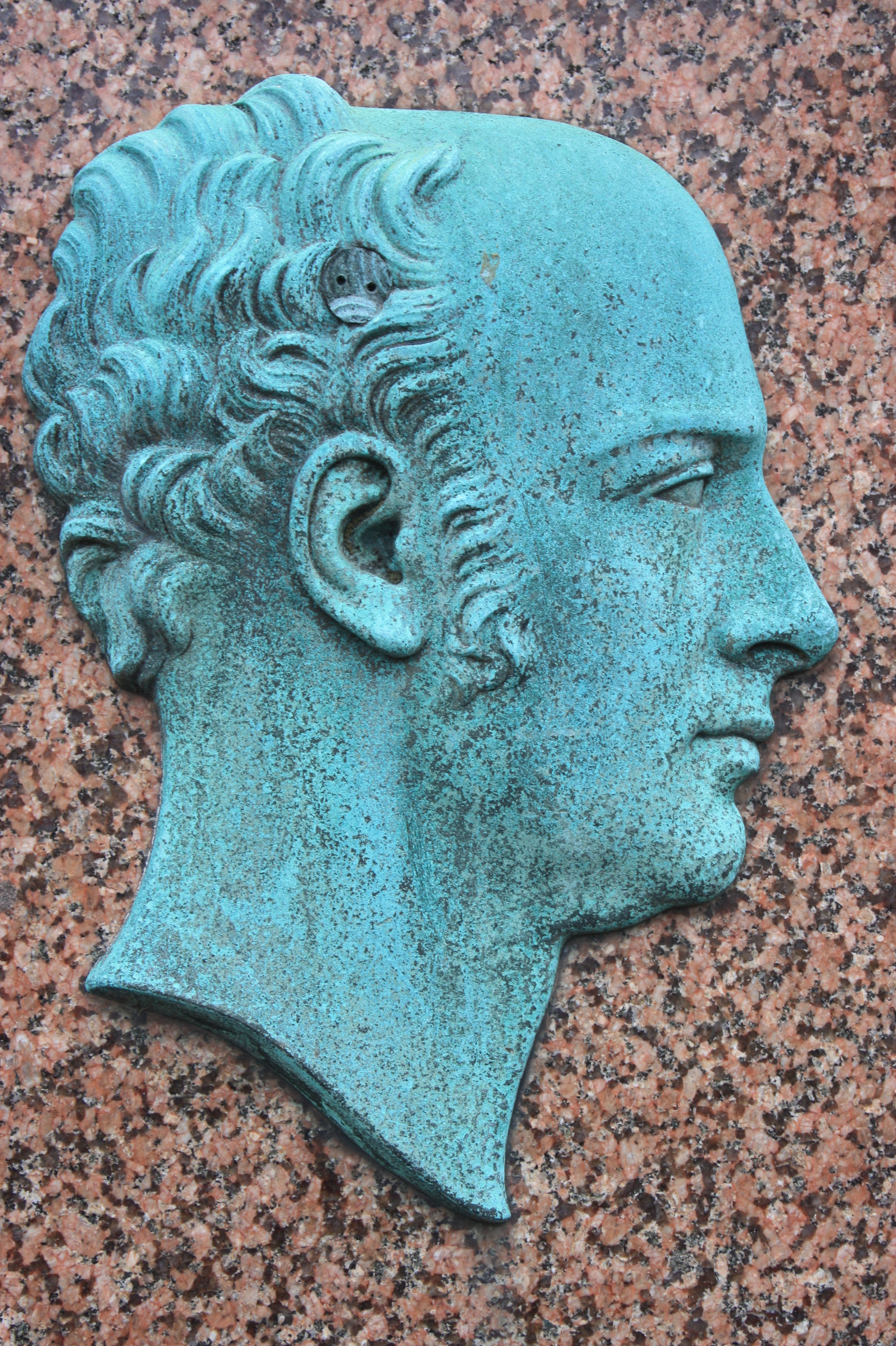
Hugh William Williams

Hugh William Williams FRSE (1773 – 19 June 1829), known as "Grecian Williams," was a Scottish landscape painter.

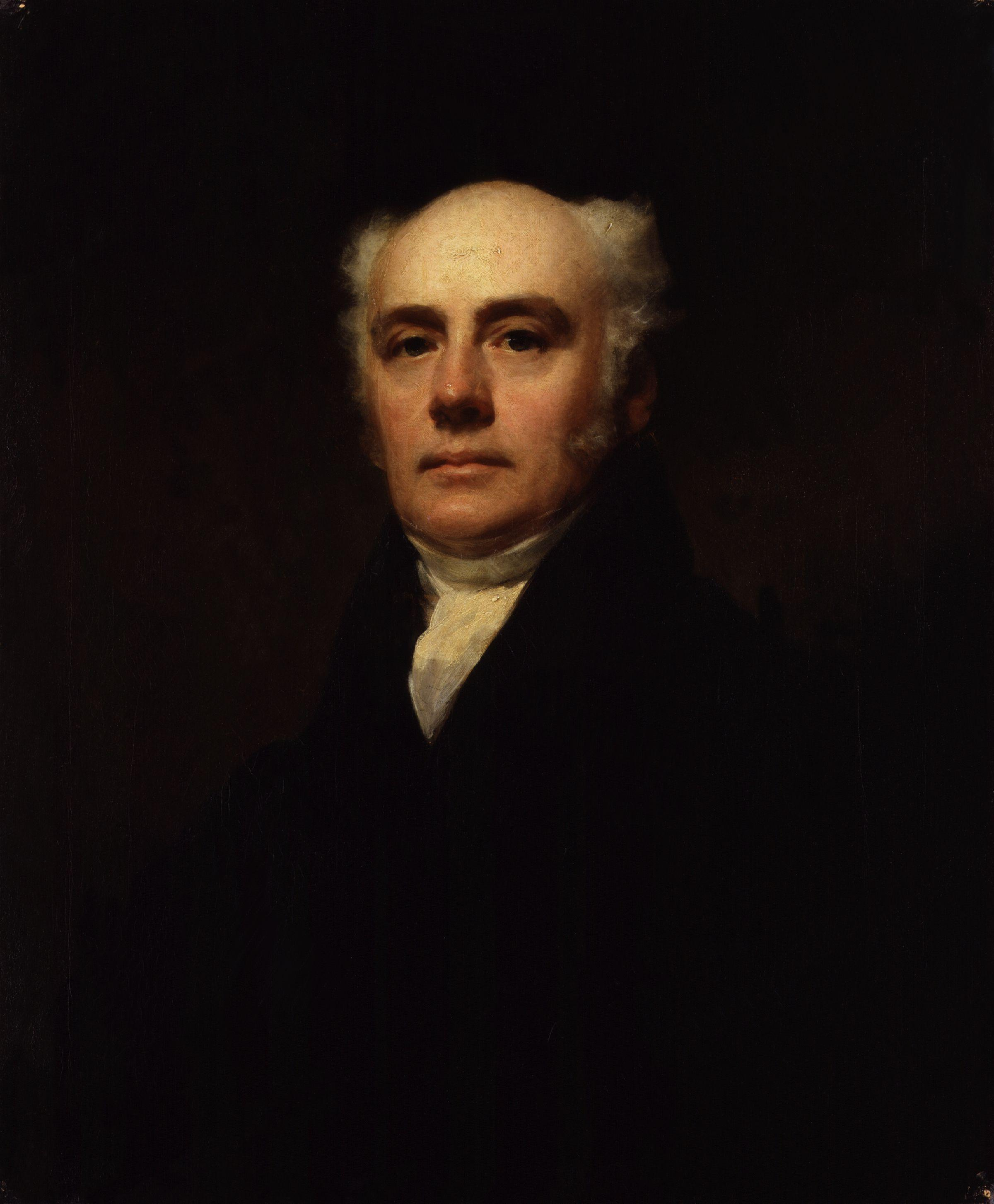
Hugh William Williams, 1818 portrait

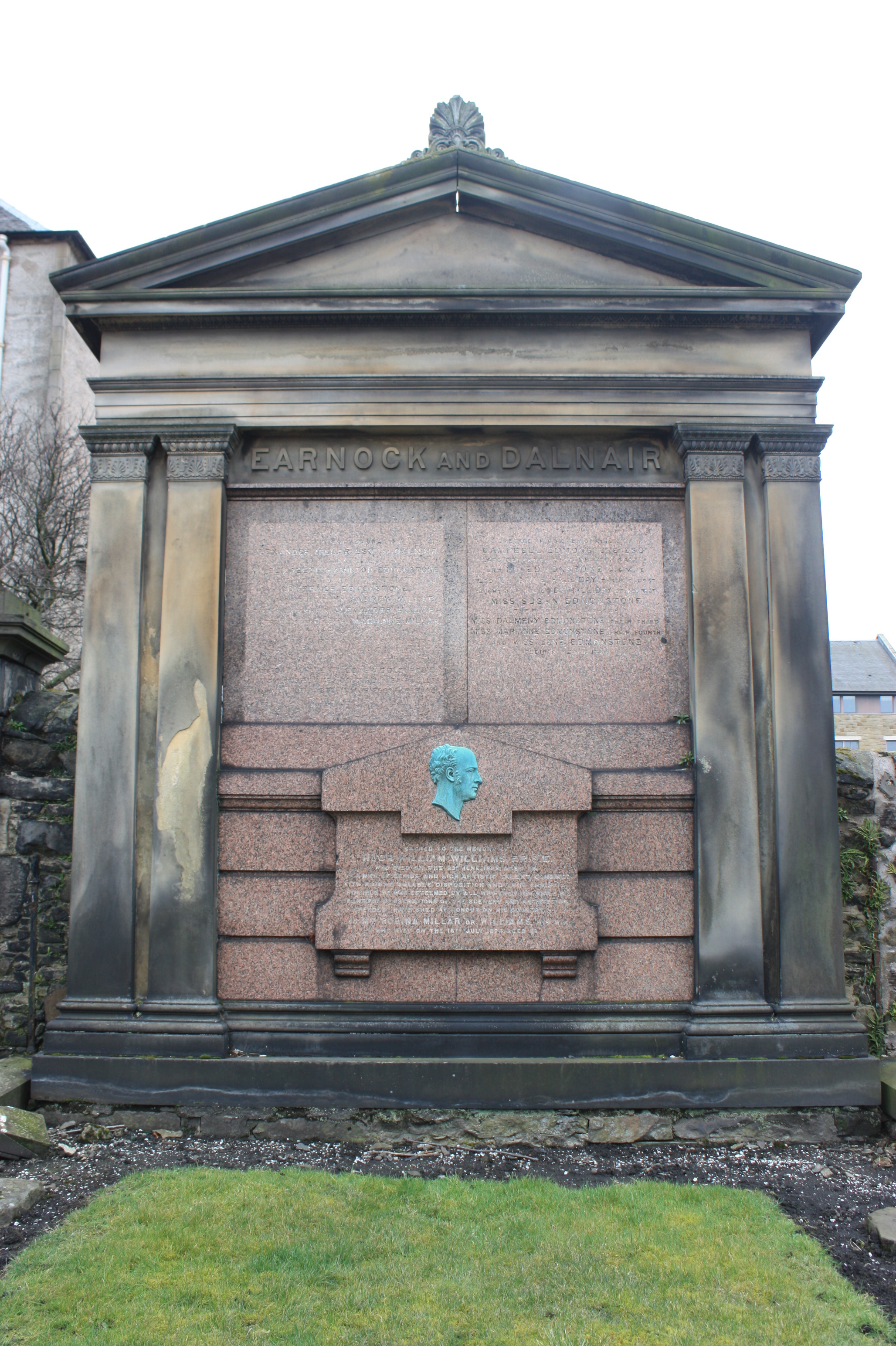
The grave of Hugh William Williams, Canongate Kirkyard

== Life ==
The early years in the life of the watercolour painter Hugh Williams remain something of a mystery. It is noted that his father was a Welsh sea captain and his mother was the daughter of the Deputy Governor of Gibraltar, Colonel Lewis. He was born at sea on a voyage to the West Indies. As he died in June 1829 aged 56, according to the Edinburgh (Canongate) Parish records, then he was probably born in 1773. According to a journal in a private collection by Dr. Anthony Todd Thomson (1778–1849), written during a stay in Edinburgh in 1823, he described his friend Williams as "a native of Devonshire". From the artist’s testament it is known that he was not an only child as is often suggested but had a sister Mary, who was living in Exeter at the time of his death and is mentioned in his testament. Mary Williams was born at Honiton in Devon in 1771, the daughter of John Williams and Mary Soper and although there is no record of Hugh's birth, they may have been his parents. The 1829 obituary of the Edinburgh Evening Courant states he was a 'native of Wales'. He lost both parents when very young and was brought up by his grandmother in Edinburgh.

By 1790 Williams was in the care of his grandmother's second husband Louis Ruffini (Turin c.1740 – Edinburgh 1807), a professional embroiderer who had tambouring businesses in Edinburgh and Dalkeith, the latter under the patronage of the Duke of Buccleuch. Ruffini encouraged Hugh to become a painter and he may have worked alongside Pasquale Casella (b. 1781) from Como in Italy, who married Hugh's step sister, Maria Ruffini on 6 June 1807, 3 days after the death of her father. He was described then and in the 1841 Census as a "drawing master". In 1793/4 Williams established a Drawing Academy in Glasgow with the miniature painter, Alexander Gallaway (fl.1793–1816) where they offered ‘Patterns for Firescreens and all kinds of needlework’ and Williams advertised 'Views of a Particular Place'. In 1797 Hugh took to acting and scene painting, initially painting a backdrop at Messrs Jones’ Royal Circus in Glasgow for a performance of The Capture of the Cape of Good Hope and later in London with the Manager/Director, John Cartwright Cross (1775–1810) in occasionally Scottish themed productions.

Williams had been creating watercolour landscapes, probably from the early 1790's, often in the Scottish Highlands where he established viewpoints; e.g. the Three Sisters in Glencoe, that would be imitated by others. But he travelled widely in the United Kingdom working in London, Wales and the Lakes District where he was a favourite with John and Jessie Harden, he the editor of the Caledonian Mercury, and they shared a passion for capturing the landscape in watercolour.

Williams exhibited View of Loch Tay, in Scotland at the Royal Academy in London in February 1800 and in 1807 he was a founding member of the Associated Artists there; exhibiting with a slightly exotic group drawn partly from the émigré community of which he was a member; J. Huet Villiers (1772–1813) who had arrived from the continent in 1801, Walter Henry Watts ARA (1781–1850) born in the East Indies, son of a naval captain and Alfred Chalon (1780–1860), son of a Huguenot refugee from Geneva. William Walker jun. (1780–1868) who had trained with the architect Robert Smirke, travelled to Greece in 1803 and would do so again in 1815, was also a member. The most significant influence on his watercolour technique after 1810 was Peter De Wint (1784–1849), of a Dutch family with a Scottish mother. Williams had encouraged artists to exhibit in Edinburgh from 1801 and he became a founding member of the Associated Artists there in 1810; a connection that would last until 1816.

An extended tour in Italy and Greece, from 1816–1818, was funded by the recently unseated Member of Parliament, William Douglas of Orchardton (d. 1821), a wealthy amateur artist, who also accompanied him. The tour gave his work its particular character, and earned him the nickname "Grecian Williams". In 1822 and 1826 Williams held an exhibition of watercolours, based on his tour, the latter in aid of the building of the National Monument on the Calton Hill by his friends, the architects C. R. Cockrell and W. H. Playfair. He took an active interest in the project, suggesting a prize for metope sculpture designs that have not survived and were never carried out. The exhibitions were a critical success, the ruins and famous scenes of Greek history chiming with the taste of the time.

Williams became an associate of the Royal Institution, Edinburgh and towards the end of his life he took an interest in the proposed amalgamation of the Scottish Academy and the artist associates of the Institution, an arrangement which was completed a month after his death.

He was elected a Fellow of the Royal Society of Edinburgh in 1823 his proposer being Sir David Brewster.

Williams died at home, 65 Castle Street. The Edinburgh Evening Courant obituary states he died of stomach cancer. He was buried in Canongate Kirkyard in the lair of his in-laws, the Millars of Earnock. His wife Robina Millar, presented a large group of his watercolours, both Scottish and Greek views, to the newly created National Gallery of Scotland in 1859 where along with the re-framed collection of watercolours by John Frederick Lewis (1804–76), transferred from the collection of the Royal Scottish Academy, they formed the nucleus of the Scottish national prints and drawings collection. Robina died in 1874. Their grave lies in the eastern extension of the churchyard, appropriately below the towering portico of Thomas Hamilton's Greek Revival masterpiece, the Royal High School on the Calton Hill.

== Works ==
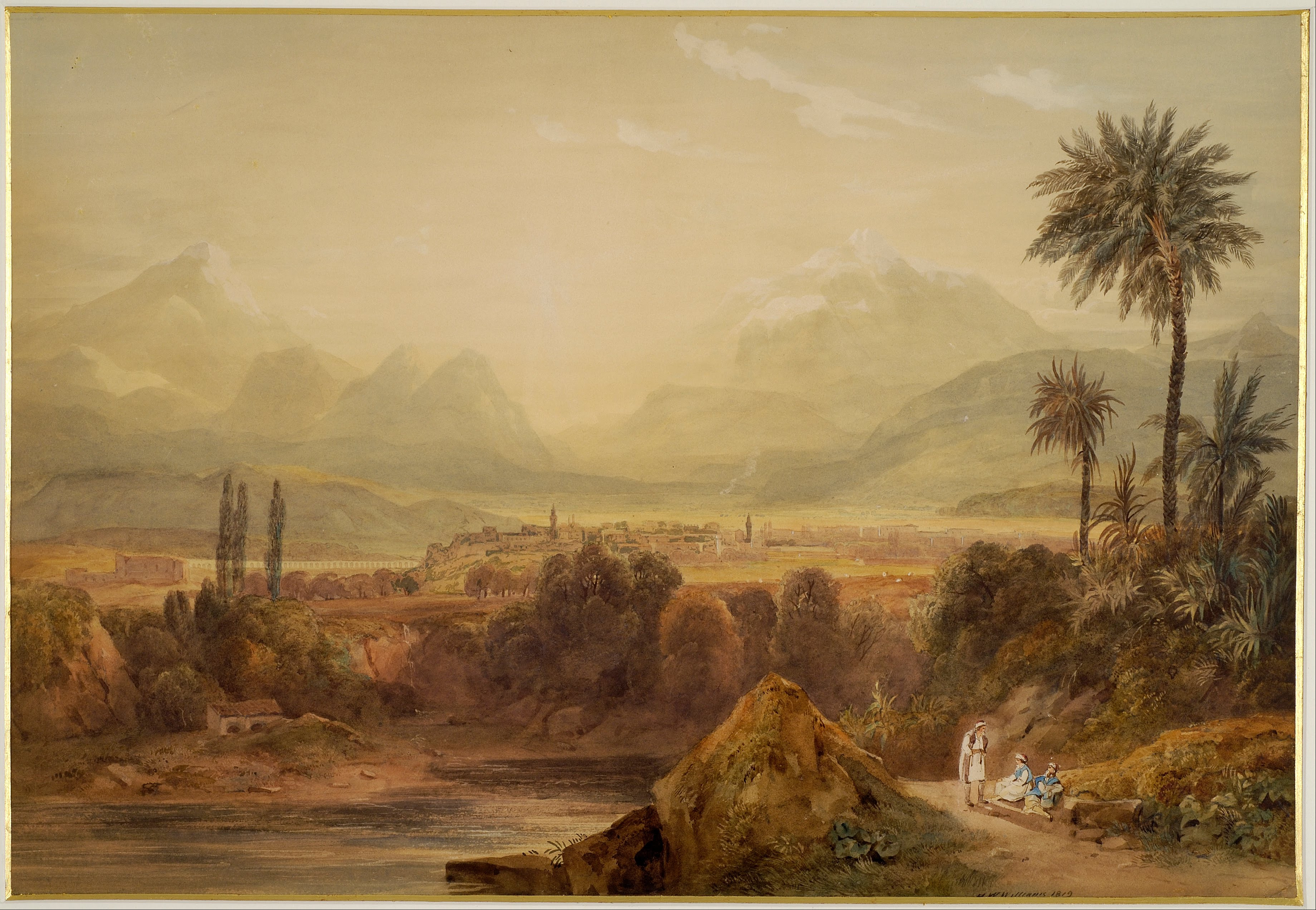
Hugh William Williams, View of Thebes (1819)

Williams was active from the early 1790s with his earliest recorded work dated 1792. Printmaking went hand in hand with his work in watercolour and Pasquale Garof (b.1774), a carver, gilder and printseller (and another native of Como who arrived in Edinburgh in 1790), published a suite of Hugh's Etchings of Local Subjects – intended to assist in the study of Nature, in 1801. They proved to be popular and reprints were still being offered in 1808 and 1814. In 1802 an engraving after a painting by Williams of Hermitage Castle, Roxburghshire, was published in Kelso as the frontispiece to Sir Walter Scott's Minstrelsy of the Scottish Border. Between 1804 and 1813 his work was reproduced as frontispiece illustrations for The Scots Magazine, engraved by Robert Scott. In 1814, Williams published six large aquatints of Highland scenery and the following year he exhibited View of Glen Coe, Highlands of Scotland at the Royal Academy, London (possibly Glencoe from the West, National Gallery of Scotland, DNG 350); a work that broke with traditional techniques and opted instead for a broad handling of watercolour washes in the manner of Peter de Wint. In June 1816 he set off on a Continental tour, most of which was spent in Rome with a journey to Greece and a stay in Athens in April/May 1817. Such was the demand for his Greek subjects on his return that the promising change in handling was left behind. His Travels in Italy, Greece and the Ionian Islands, from letters written to his friend, the artist John Thomson of Duddingston, appeared in two volumes in 1820. The illustrations were engraved by William Home Lizars from drawings by the author. In 1823 Williams published the first number of his Select Views in Greece with parts appearing regularly until 1829.

The artist used a very refined version of a common watercolour technique, popular from the eighteenth century. He began with the faintest possible pencil outline (never an ink outline) and restricted his colours in a Classical way, to red, blue and yellow, overlaid to create greens – an effect practiced by young women to colour calicos, on the Continent and in the west of Scotland in the same period. He used Indigo in his earliest large watercolours but these darkened with age and he soon gave it up. His watercolours also suffered occasionally from his experience as a scene painter, becoming rapid and superficial – he was extraordinarily prolific. Unfortunately his work also faded and published commentary, almost without exception, has been based on analysis of faded works which probably make up 90% of his surviving output. The recent discovery of a small group of his early works, stored in a portfolio in the library at Blickling Hall in Norfolk (National Trust) from the time of their creation, has completely changed the way we see his work.

The artist's work was gifted to the National Gallery of Scotland in 1859 and The Victoria and Albert Museum holds works that were part of their circulating collection – much to their detriment. More works can be found in the public collections of Rijksmuseum Amsterdam, Benaki Museum Athens, Williamson Art Gallery Birkenhead, Birmingham Museum, Fitwilliam Museum Cambridge, National Museum of Wales Cardiff, National Museum Northern Ireland, the British Museum and many other galleries. Research by The Fine Art Society has shown that most of his large Greek views are held in that country.

== Family ==
Shortly after his return from the Middle East in 1827, Williams married the wealthy Miss Robina Miller of Garnock. They had no children. In 1829, Williams died after a severe bout of illness that had afflicted him since the previous year. He was buried in the Miller plot in the Cannongate churchyard, Edinburgh on 22 June. Robina and the other trustees, Æneas MacBean WS, and the miniaturist painter William John Thomson RSA, arranged a studio sale in 1831.
