= Fenning =

Fenning is a surname. Notable people with the surname include:

- Elizabeth Fenning (1792–1815), domestic servant whose controversial conviction for attempted murder became a cause célèbre
- John Fenning (1885–1955), British doctor and rower who competed in the 1908 Summer Olympics
- Paddy Fenning (1950–2020), Irish retired sportsperson
