= Robert Firth =

Robert Firth may refer to:

- Robert Firth (judge) (1918–1984), U.S. district judge
- Robert Firth (footballer) (1887–1966), English footballer
- Sir Robert Hammill Firth (1857–1931), British Army surgeon, tropical medicine specialist, and professor of military hygiene
