= Elizabeth Fenning =

British criminal (1792–1815)

Elizabeth Fenning (c. 1792–1815) was a domestic servant whose controversial conviction for attempted murder and execution became an issue of widespread controversy and debate.

== Background ==
Fenning was born to poor parents, and from age 14 she worked in various situations as a domestic servant. Towards the end of January 1815 she entered the service of tradesman Orlibar Turner of 68 Chancery Lane, London, in the capacity of cook. Weeks later, on 21 March, Turner and his son Robert Gregson Turner and daughter-in-law Charlotte Turner all became very unwell after eating yeast dumplings that Fenning had prepared. They soon recovered, but discovered that arsenic had been mixed into the dumpling batter, and suspicion fell on Fenning.

== Criminal proceedings ==
Fenning was summoned to Hatton Garden police-court and committed for trial. The case came before the Old Bailey on 11 April 1815, when Fenning was charged with feloniously administering arsenic to the three Turners with intent to murder them.

Evidence was brought against Fenning that she had asked and received leave to make the dumplings, and that she was alone in the kitchen during the whole time of their preparation; that the poison was neither in the flour nor in the milk; and that Fenning was acquainted with and had access to a drawer in her employer's office where arsenic was kept. Roger Gadsden, an apprentice of Turner, had eaten a piece of dumpling after dinner, though Fenning had strongly advised him not to touch it, and he had also fallen ill.

Fenning pleaded not guilty and urged that she herself had eaten of the dumplings, a piece of testimony which was corroborated by Turner's mother, who said that she had been sent for, and on arrival had found the prisoner very sick. The prisoner, protesting her innocence, tried to show that Mrs. Turner had a spite against her. Five witnesses were called, and each one gave Fenning a character of respectability and good nature. The recorder's summing-up was strongly against the prisoner; the jury found her guilty, and she was sentenced to death. On hearing the sentence pronounced she fell into a fit and was carried insensible from the dock.

== Execution ==
Popular opinion was largely in favour of Fenning's innocence, and every effort was made by her friends and others to procure a remission of the sentence. Orlibar Turner even tried to sign a petition to save Eliza but was stopped when the recorder who sentenced her came to his house and said that if he did, the Turner family would be investigated for the crime.

On the day before that fixed for the execution, a meeting was held at the Home Office to consider the case. Lord Sidmouth, the Home Secretary, was out of town, but the Lord Chancellor Lord Eldon, the recorder, and Mr Becket were present, and concluded that there was no reason to interfere. Lord Eldon summoned another meeting in the evening, with the same result. On the following morning, 26 July, Fenning was hanged, in company with two other malefactors, Oldfield and Adams, the former for raping a child and the latter for sodomy.

== Aftermath ==
Intense public interest was excited, it being generally believed that Fenning was innocent, a belief which was strengthened by her declaration on the scaffold: 'Before the just and almighty God, and by the faith of the holy sacrament I have taken, I am innocent of the offence with which I am charged.' At her funeral, which took place five days later at St George the Martyr, Bloomsbury, the pall was accompanied by six girls dressed in white, and as many as 10,000 persons took part in the procession which was formed to the grave. A local newspaper reported: "Every window was thronged, and in many places the tops of the houses were covered with spectators." Because there was not room in the church, most of the attendants had to remain outside. Many constables were present to prevent violence, but only one fight occurred.

In the wake of the execution, a mob of over 1,000 gathered outside of the Turner home threatening to burn it down. Police dispersed them and arrested two men. However, crowds of hundreds "with an intention of doing mischief" continued to come over the next few days, so constables had to remain outside of the Turner residence. Ultimately, no damage was done and the mobs eventually stopped coming to the house.

Although Fenning was executed, William Hone's 240-page book on the subject, The Important Results of an Elaborate Investigation into the Mysterious Case of Eliza Fenning – widely considered a landmark in investigative journalism – demolished the prosecution's case. In it, he claimed that Eliza was executed to show other servants what would happen to them if they harmed their masters/mistresses. He wrote: "All the masters and mistresses of families, who credulity or idleness rendered them proper subjects for alarums, were excessively devoted to the vociferous execration of the wickedness of servants."

Samuel Parr and Charles Dickens believed in her innocence, as did John Gordon Smith. In an 1829 publication, Smith highlighted an article in the Morning Journal from March that year which details the death of Robert Gregson Turner in Ipswich Workhouse after he confessed his guilt for the crime for which Fenning was hanged. In 1854, the play, The Persecuted Serving Girl!, was made based on her case.

Author Sandra Hempel, who specialises in topics of health, has highlighted the Fenning case as one which led to the development and advancement of forensic evidence as a means of determining guilt in murder trials. Hempel contends that contemporary experts analysed the forensic evidence available to them and resultantly cast serious doubt on Fenning's alleged guilt, only for the evidence to be ignored, largely as a result of the failings of the courtroom. The case received much public and academic attention and probably helped catalyse further scientific developments in the field of forensics.
