= William John Thomson =

American painter and miniaturist (1771–1845)

William John Thomson RSA
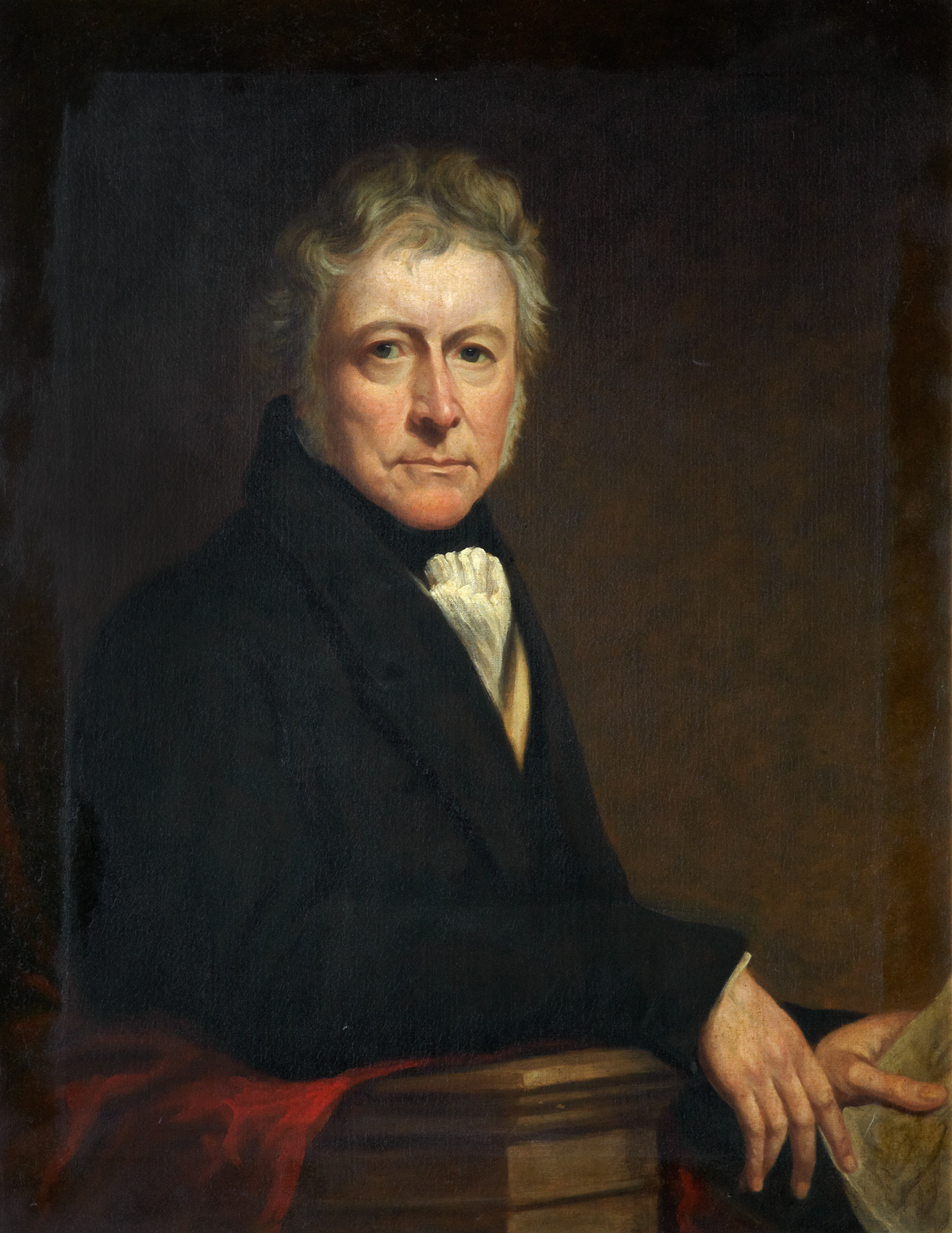
- Self-portrait, Royal Scottish Academy
- Born: William John Thomson; 3 October 1771; Savannah, Georgia, Great Britain
- Died: 24 March 1845 (aged 73); Edinburgh, Scotland
- Burial place: Edinburgh, Scotland, United Kingdom
- Occupations: Painter and miniaturist
- Spouse: Helen J. Colhoun (m. 1797) Anne McCulloch (m. 1817)
- Children: 7

William John Thomson RSA (3 October 1771 – 24 March 1845) was an American-born painter of silhouettes, portraits and miniatures who was active in Great Britain.

== Early life ==
Thomson was born in Savannah, Chatham County, Georgia, on 3 October 1771 to Scottish parents, Alexander Thomson and Mary Elizabeth Thomson née Spencer. Thomson's first sister Margaret was born in 1773, his second sister born in 1775 was Catherine Thomson, later the stepmother of Elizabeth Gaskell. They migrated to England during the American Revolutionary War. His younger brother, born in Edinburgh in 1778 was Anthony Todd Thomson, the doctor who had delivered Gaskell. He moved to London and learned to paint. He exhibited at the Royal Academy of Arts in 1795. He married Helen J Colhoun in Edinburgh 12 May 1797. He was considered for election to the Royal Academy in 1808. He exhibited his work at The British Institution between 1809 - 1829 whilst living in London at 6 Charles Street, 41 Craven St and 111 The Strand. In Edinburgh at 59 York Place and Northumberland Avenue. In 1812, he moved back to his ancestral home of Scotland and settled in Edinburgh. Around 1817, he married Anne McCulloch (d.1855). The two marriages produced seven children. After marriage they lived at 20 Dundas Street in the New Town.

== Painting style ==
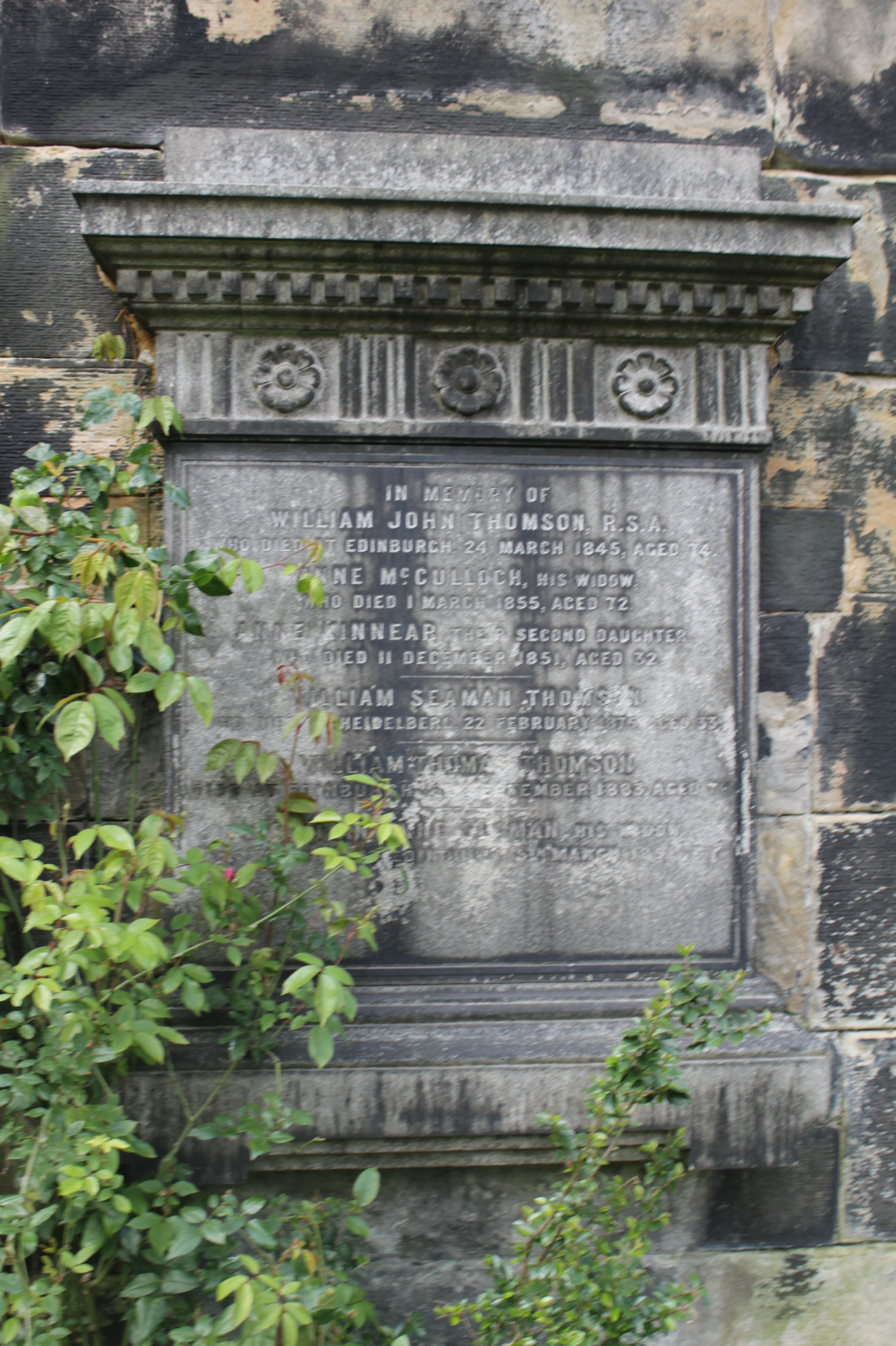
The gravestone of William John Thomson, St John's Churchyard, Edinburgh

Thomson worked in a solemn, realistic, somewhat simplified style, devoid of the affectation that often characterized the work of his contemporaries. His subjects face slightly to the right; their features are emphatically delineated, the left eye appearing overly large. A pink tonality suffuses the paintings, reddish brown shading models the forms and brown hatching often makes up the background. Thomson was a miniaturist, although he sometimes exercised his talents on large portraits and small full-lengths. To accuracy of execution he added great richness of effect, preciousness of finish, and depth of tone.

== Later years ==
He became a prominent figure in the artistic life of Scotland, holding a variety of official positions. He exhibited portraits, miniatures, landscapes and genre paintings.

On 16 July 1823, his younger brother Anthony Todd Thomson submitted a request to Robert Dundas that Thomson succeeds the late Sir Henry Raeburn as the King's Limner for Scotland, (the post was given to David Wilkie ).

On 17 April 1824, he was elected Associate Member of the Institution for the Encouragement of Fine Arts in Scotland which later became the Royal Scottish Academy.

On 7 October 1829, he was elected academician of Royal Scottish Academy.

In 1831, as trustee to the estate of Hugh William Williams (Artist) along with Mrs Robina Williams, Aeneas MacBain WS, he organised a studio sale.

In June 1832, he painted a miniature of his step niece Elizabeth Gaskell see below. (née Stevenson) author of Cranford.

In 1834 and 1835, he was a director of the Caledonian Insurance company alongside Henry Raeburn.

He lived at 47 Northumberland Street, Edinburgh in the 1830s until he died on 24 March 1845 He is buried at St John's Episcopal graveyard in Edinburgh. The grave lies on a south-facing wall at the west side of the lower terrace. His wife and children lie with him.

The memorial to his parents and grandparents is in Canongate Churchyard.

== Family ==
He was married to Anne McCulloch (1783-1855).

== Examples of his miniaturist and portraiture work ==
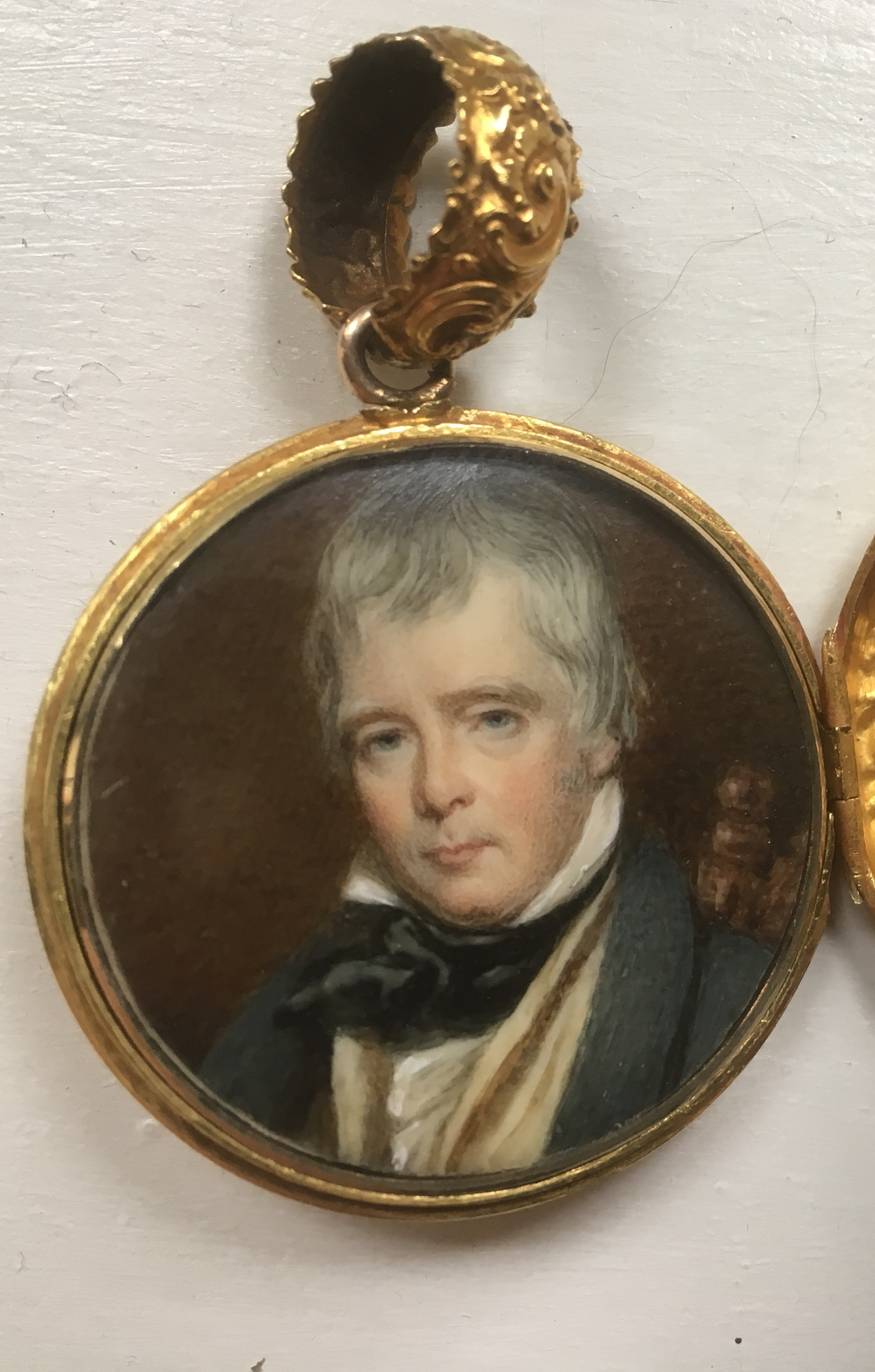
Sir Walter Scott memorial locket. A private commission 1832.

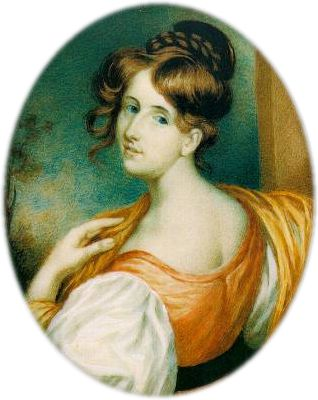
Elizabeth Gaskell in Edinburgh June 1832.

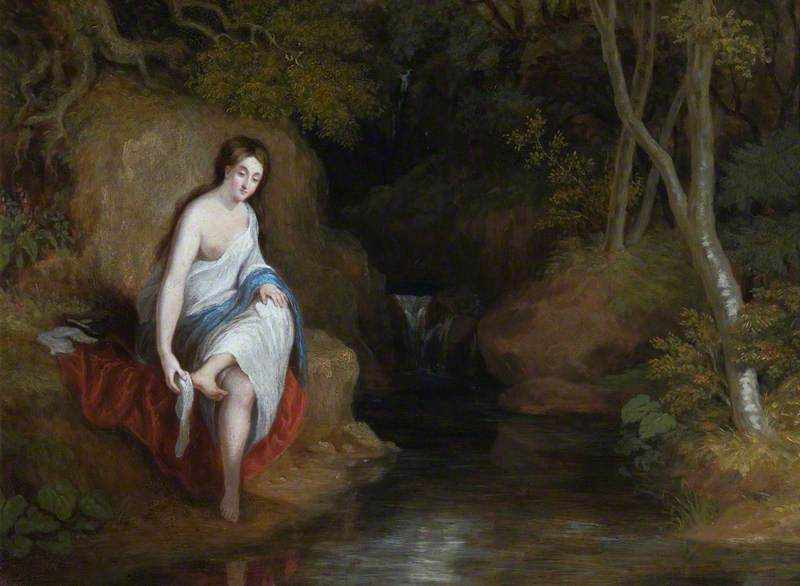
Musidora Circa 1836. Royal Scottish Academy of Art and Architecture.

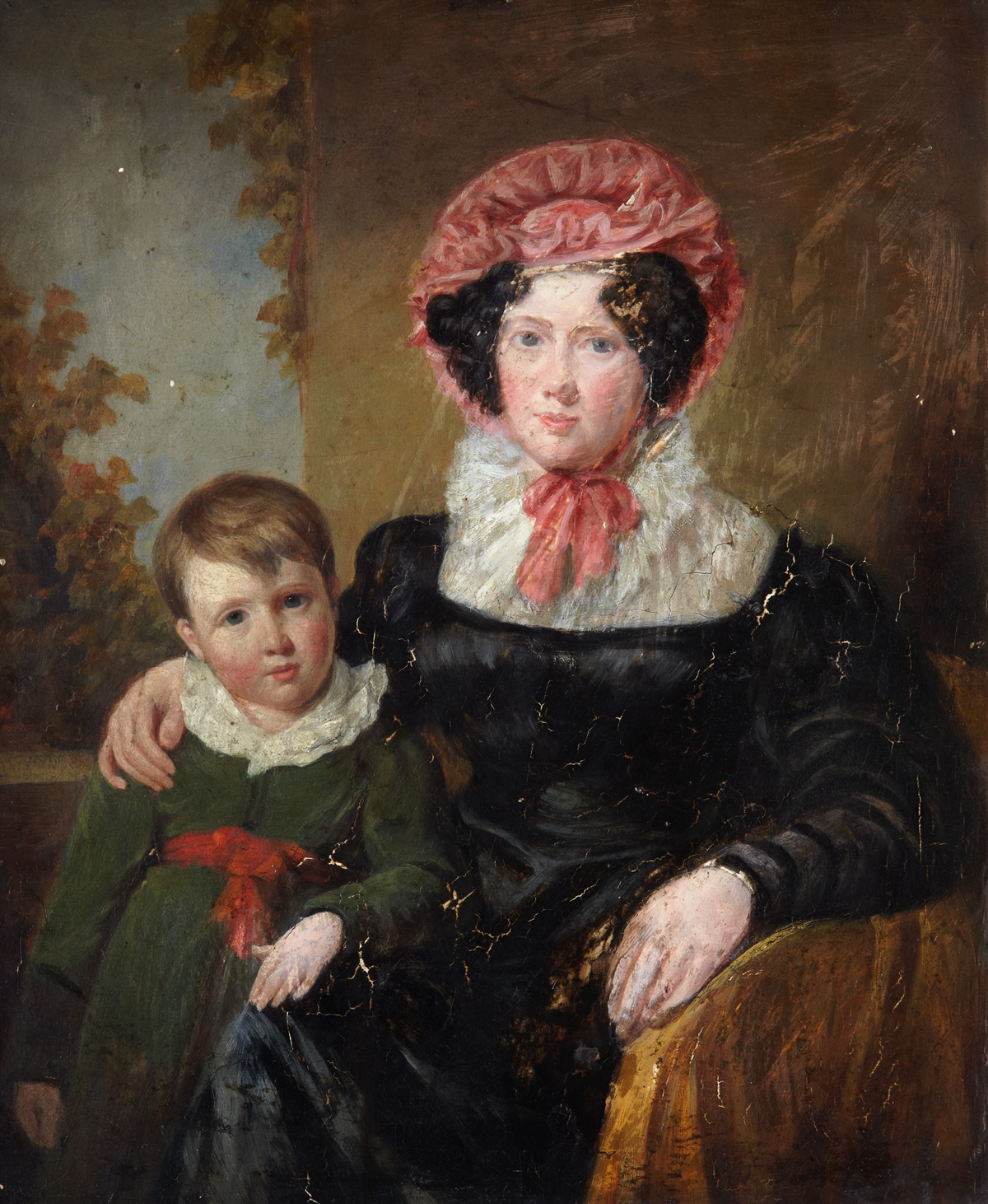
Mrs H J Thomson and her son James born 8 Mar 1798. Royal Scottish Academy of Art and Architecture.

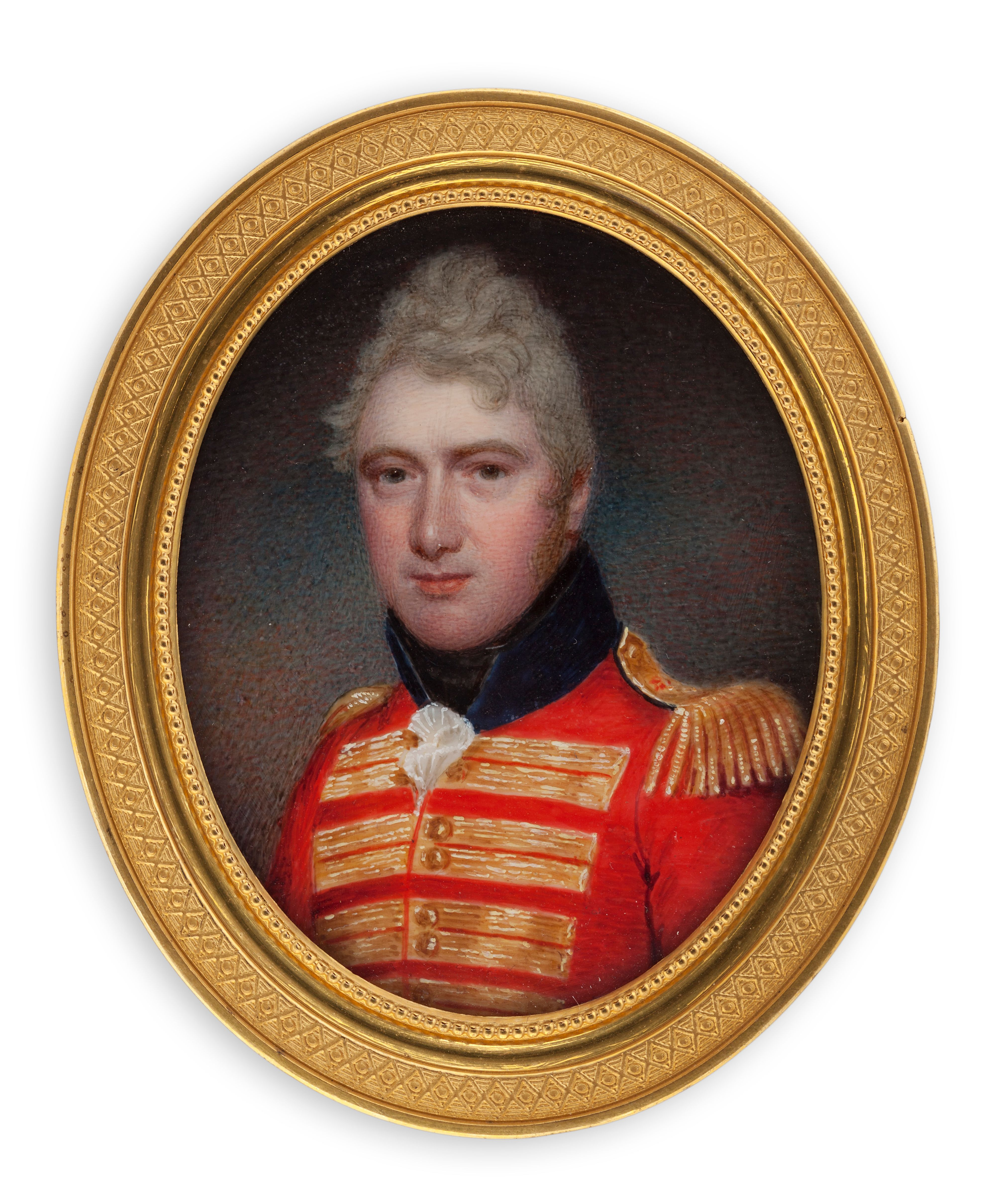
Portrait of an English officer - Finnish National Gallery

Many of his works can be found in The Royal Scottish Academy, 1826-1916; complete list of the exhibited works by Raeburn and by academicians, associates and hon. members, giving details of those works in public galleries. Thomson's works cover 3 pages with exhibits from 1810 - 1883. Pages 398 - 401.
