= Thomas Bridgford =

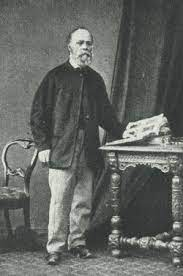
Thomas Bridgford C. 1875 (1812–1878)

Thomas Bridgford RHA, Royal Hibernian Academician, was a British artist, in London and Manchester, England. Bridgford was born on 6 April 1812. He moved with his family to Ireland, in 1817. In the same year, 1827, he first exhibited work at the Royal Hibernian Academy at the age of fifteen. He went to London in 1834, to work as a portrait painter and returned to Dublin in 1844. Whilst in London he regularly exhibited at The Royal Academy between 1834 and 1844.

He produced portraits, paintings, and lithographs, in England and Ireland. Many of his pencil portraits are of scientific members of the University College of London, an example shown on the original lithograph of Anthony Todd Thomson. He became an Associate of The Royal Hibernian Academy in Dublin 24th Oct 1832, and became a member after his return from London 23 August 1851. In the year 1833, he married Mary Jane Sawyer, the sister of the surgeon James Sawyer of Dublin. He had five sons and 4 daughters.

Bridgford died on 21 November 1878 in Dublin, Ireland.

== See also ==
- Anthony Todd Thomson
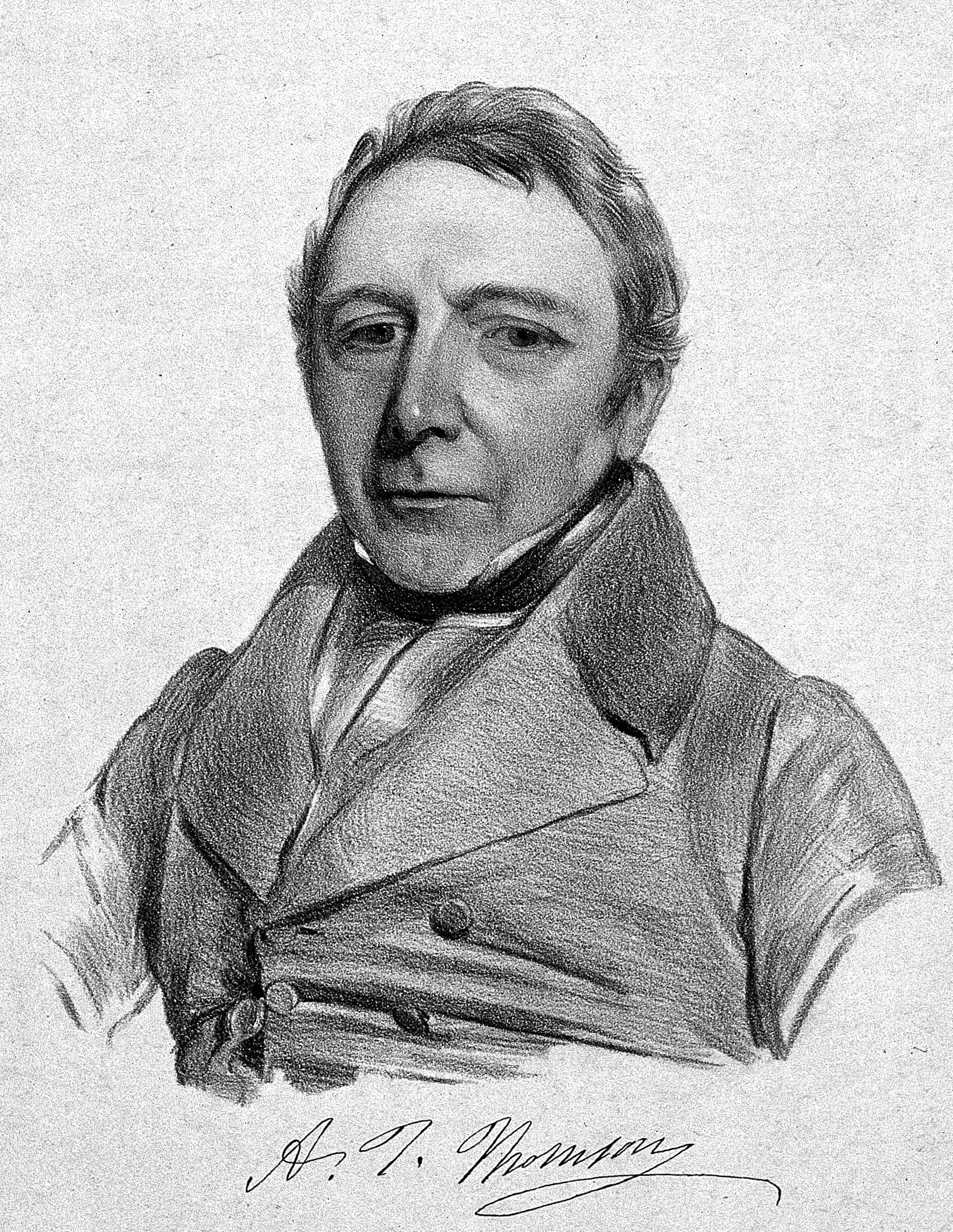
  Anthony Todd Thomson
- Dionysius Lardner
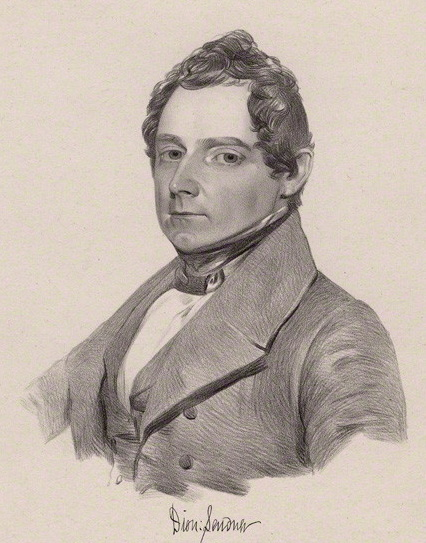
  portrait of Dionysius Lardner, engraving after Thomas Bridgford
