= Anthony Todd Thomson =

Scottish doctor and pioneer of dermatology (1778-1849)

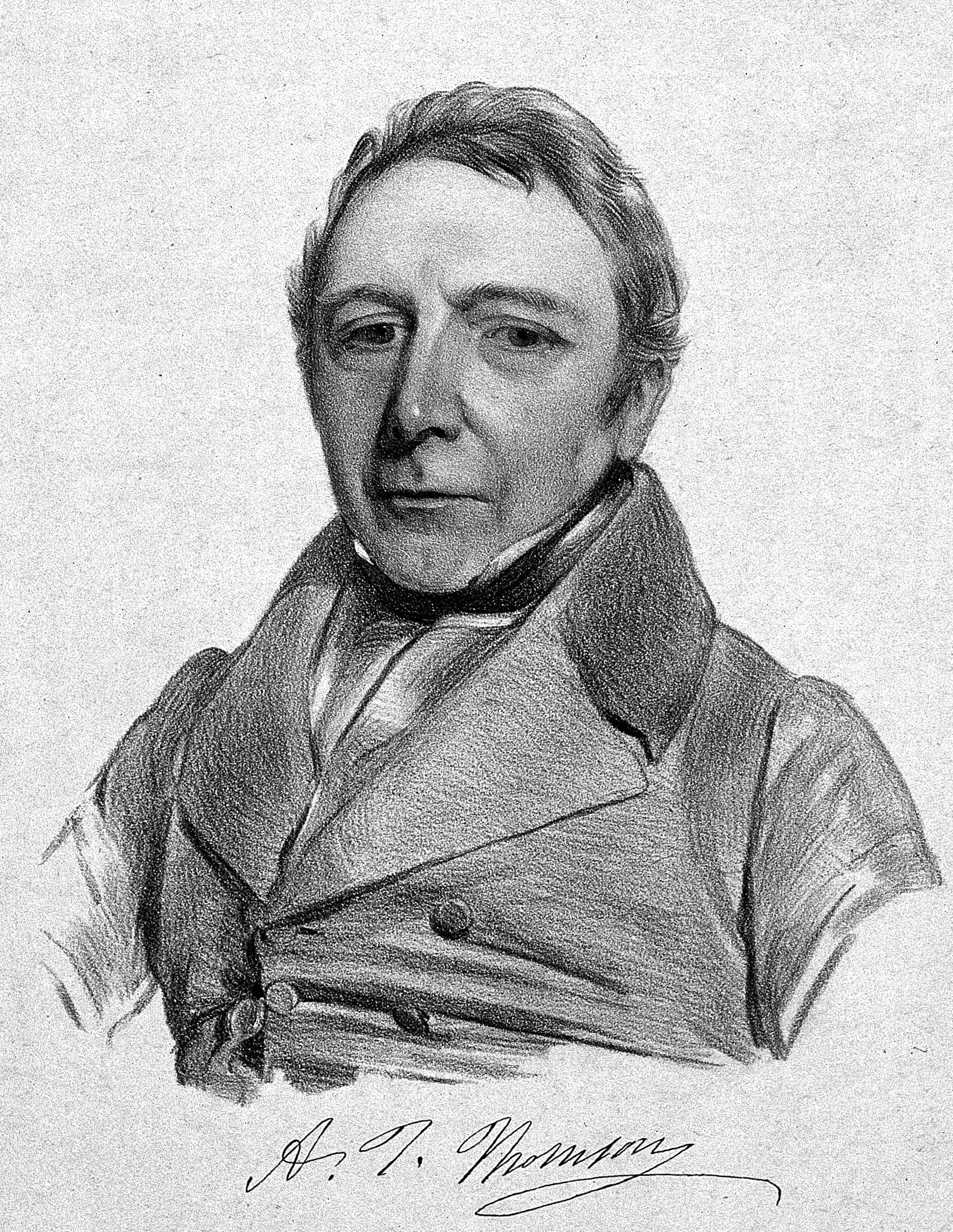
- Anthony Todd Thomson by Thomas Bridgford c.1840
- Born: 7 January 1778; Edinburgh, Scotland
- Died: 3 July 1849 (aged 71); London, England
- Resting place: St Mary's Church Perivale, London
- Education: Royal High School
- Alma mater: University of Edinburgh
- Spouses: Christina Maxwell (m. 1801; died 1819) Katherine Byerley (m. 1820)
- Children: 4 sons, 7 daughters
- Father: Alexander Thomson

Anthony Todd Thomson (7 January 1778 – 3 July 1849) was a Scottish doctor and pioneer of dermatology.

== Life ==
Anthony Todd Thomson was the younger son of Alexander Thomson and was born in Edinburgh, where his parents were staying temporarily, on 7 January 1778. His father was postmaster-general and a member of the council of the Province of Georgia, and collector of customs for the town of Savannah. Anthony returned to America with his parents soon after Anthony Todd, postmaster of Edinburgh, had stood sponsor to him as his godson; but when peace was declared after the American War of Independence, his father, in common with many American loyalists, threw up his appointments, and settled in Edinburgh with a small pension from the government. Thomson was brought up by Mrs. Rennie, who afterwards became his stepmother. He was educated at the Royal High School, and was nominated, by his godfather's interest, to a clerkship in the Edinburgh post office. He graduated doctor of medicine at the University of Edinburgh in 1799, and in November of the same year he became a member of the Royal Medical Society. He had previously been admitted a member of the Speculative Society, on 27 February 1798, and there formed a lifelong friendship with Lord Brougham, having already gained the affection of Henry (afterwards Lord) Cockburn. He spent the next twenty five years as a GP in Sloane Street, Chelsea.

He married twice. In 1801 he married Christina Maxwell, and they had one son and two daughters, but she died 6 May 1819 at their home in Sloane Street Chelsea, London.

On 29 September 1810 Thompson attended the birth of the writer Elizabeth Gaskell, and his sister Catherine became Gaskell's stepmother.

In 1820 he married Katherine Byerley, a prolific writer. She was the daughter of Thomas Byerley, connected with the Wedgwood pottery. They had three sons and five daughters, including Elizabeth, mother of Rennell Rodd, 1st Baron Rennell.

On 16 July 1823 he submitted a request to Robert Dundas, 2nd Viscount Melville that his elder brother William John Thomson succeeds the late Sir Henry Raeburn as the King's Limner for Scotland, (the post was later given to David Wilkie).

In 1828 he became the first professor of materia medica and therapeutics at London University (now University College London). In 1832, on the death of John Gordon Smith, he was appointed joint professor of medical jurisprudence with Andrew Amos. In 1837 Amos was appointed a member of the Governor-General's Council of India and so Thomson became sole professor.

Thompson is buried at St Mary's Church Perivale, London.

== Works ==
- The London Dispensatory. 2nd Ed. London : Longman, 1818. Digital edition by the University and State Library Düsseldorf
- The London Dispensatory. 3rd Ed. London : Longman, 1822. Digital edition by the University and State Library Düsseldorf
- The London Dispensatory. 4th Ed. London : Longman, 1826. Digital edition by the University and State Library Düsseldorf
- The London Dispensatory. 5th Ed. London : Longman, 1830. Digital edition by the University and State Library Düsseldorf
  - A. Braune (Übersetzer). A. T. Thomson’s Vereinigte Pharmacopoeen der Londoner, Edinburgher und Dubliner Medicinal-Collegien. Nach der fünften Original-Ausgabe, und als Übersicht der Britischen Arzneymittel-Lehre, mit Zusätzen. Ernst Fleischer, Leipzig 1827 Digital edition
- The London dispensatory. Containing I. The elements of Pharmacy. II. The botanical description, natural histoty, chymical analysis, and medical properties, of the substances of the materia medica. III. The pharmaceutical preparations and compositions of the Pharmacopeeias of London, Edinburgh and Dublin. 8th Ed. Longman, London 1836 Digital edition

== Translated works ==
- A. T. Thomson's Vereinigte Pharmacopeen der Londoner, Edinburgher und Dubliner Medicinal-Collegien. Fleischer, Leipzig 1827 digital
