= Paul Zacchias =

Italian medical scientist, teacher, philosopher, and poet

- Portrait of Paul Zacchias
- Born: 1584; Rome, Lazio, Italy
- Died: 21 March 1659 (aged 74–75); Rome, Lazio, Italy
- Education: Sapienza University of Rome (M.D., about 1608)
- Known for: Quaestiones medico-legales, 1621–35 on legal medicine
- Scientific career
- Fields: Medicine; Medical jurisprudence
- Doctoral advisor: Marsilio Cagnati

Paolo Zacchia (1584–1659) was an Italian physician, teacher of medical science and forensic medicine, medico-legal jurist, philosopher, and poet. He is said to have been personal physician to Pope Innocentius X and Pope Alexander VII. Zacchias was also legal adviser to the Rota Romana, the highest Papal court of appeals, and head of the medical system in the Papal States. His most well-known book in three volumes, Quæstiones medico-legales (1621–1651), established legal medicine as a topic of study.

Zacchias's work also contains superstitious views on magic, witches, and demons which were widely held. At the time, both theological and medical knowledge were required to differentiate natural causes of sickness from supernatural causes which might require attention of the Catholic church. Zacchias took a skeptical approach that attempted to eliminate natural causes before diagnosing phenomena as witchcraft. Medical practitioners at his time were also made available to diagnose and assess between miracles and natural causes.

He is known to have argued that minors make proper test subjects to be put to torture. Despite these views, Zacchias is seen to have notably progressed the works of jurisprudence in medicine of the time period.

== Biography ==
Paul Zacchias was born in Rome in 1584 and died in the city in 1659. He was director of the health system of the Papal States, as well as legal adviser to the Rota Romana, the highest Papal court of appeals.

Under Emperor Charles V of the Holy Roman Empire in 1532, legal medicine was introduced to the court system via penal code. However, Zacchias's work helped to add scientific basis to the legal practice and court system.

== Quæstiones medico-legales ==
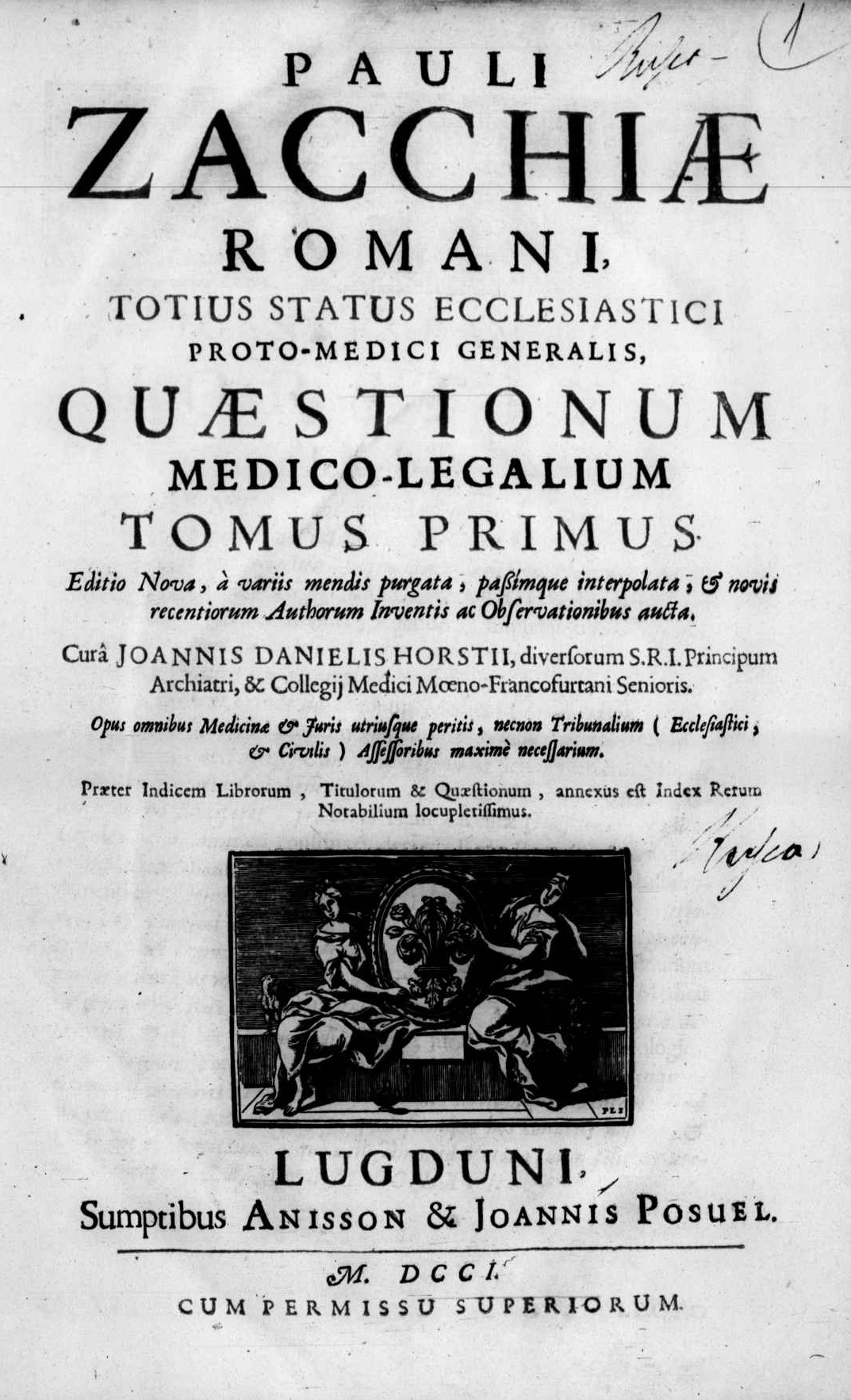
Quaestiones medico-legales, tome I, 1701 edition

Quæstiones medico-legales is divided into three sections. The first section contains decisions of the Rota Romana during his time serving on it. The other two sections cover questions of human physiology. In them, he examines problems such as the formation of hermaphrodites, and the animation of the foetus and superfoetation. The later two volumes also include many observations by Zacchias on mental disease. Zacchias was also familiar with hypochondriacal disorder or those without genuine illness.

Quæstiones medico-legales was translated into several other languages from Latin, and was used by medical practitioners into the 18th century. Since 2008, a collaborative online project of scholars has been crowd-sourcing an English-language translation of the 85 Consilia at the end of this important book.

=== Editions ===
- —— (1701). Quaestiones medico-legales (in Latin). Vol. 1. Lyon: Jean Anisson & Jean Posuel.
- —— (1701). Quaestiones medico-legales (in Latin). Vol. 2. Lyon: Jean Anisson & Jean Posuel.
- —— (1701). Quaestiones medico-legales (in Latin). Vol. 3. Lyon: Jean Anisson & Jean Posuel.
