= Nerio Rojas =

Nerio Rojas (March 7, 1890 – 1971) was an Argentine physician who authored more than three hundred works on forensic medicine.

== Works ==
- Legal Medicine (1936 and 1942). a treaty that has long been used in university education;
- Non-actuality of Bergsonism?: International symposium. In collaboration with several authors. Chapter: "From Bergson to Freud", pages 339 to 348.
- Psychiatry in civil law: comments on the Civil Code and the reform bill (1938).
- Hunger: study medical, legal and social (1946).
- Medicolegal Decalogue.
- Sarmiento Psychology (1916).
- Compendium of Legal Medicine (1918).
- Injuries. Medical-legal study (1926).
- The spirit of physician training (1928).
- The venereal contagion in forensic medicine (1937), award-winning work by the Faculty of Medical Sciences with the award "Eduardo Perez". In collaboration with Frederick Bonnet.
- Legal Medicine and job security (1940)
- Biology of Freedom (1958).
