= William Hone =

English writer, satirist and bookseller (1780–1842)

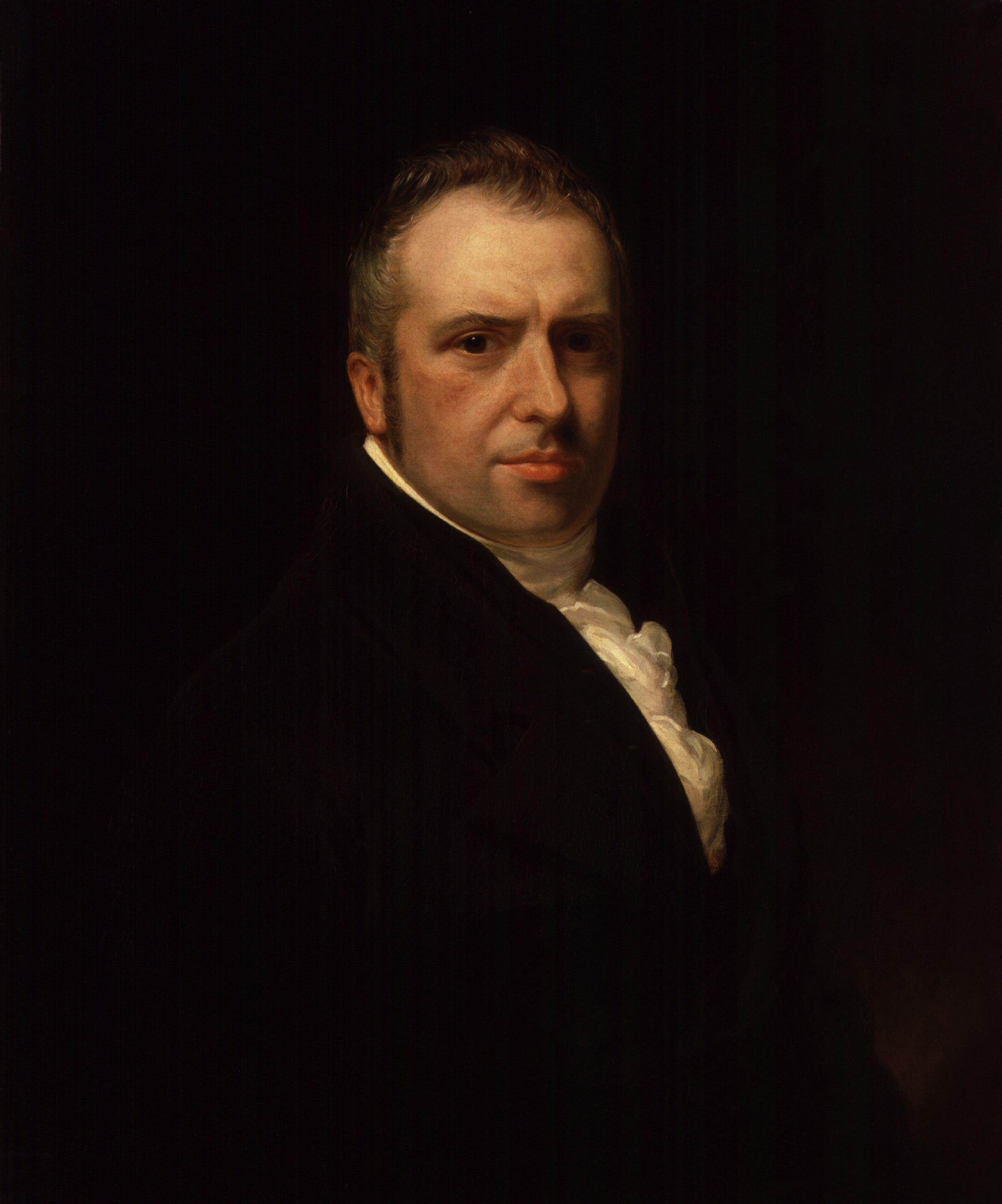
William Hone by William Patten

William Hone (3 June 1780 – 8 November 1842) was an English writer, satirist and bookseller. His victorious court battle against government censorship in 1817 marked a turning point in the fight for British press freedom.

== Biography ==
Hone has been described as one of the fathers of modern media. According to Associate Professor Kyle Grimes from the University of Alabama, "William Hone arguably did more than any other writer, printer or publisher to shape British popular print culture in the early decades of the nineteenth century."

Hone was born at Bath on 3 June 1780, one of three children to William Hone Senior (born at Homewood Farm in Ripley, Surrey) and Francis Stalwell. William's only surviving brother, Joseph Hone (1784–1861) was a Supreme Court judge in Tasmania, Australia.

William was an inquisitive child, whose father taught him to read from the Bible. For a number of years William attended a small school run by Dame Bettridge, to whom he was very close.

In 1783, William's father moved to London and found work in an Attorney's office. He encouraged William Junior to follow in this profession. After two-and-a-half years in the office of a solicitor at Chatham, William Hone Junior returned to London to become clerk to a solicitor at Gray's Inn. He disliked the law as a profession and said he spent more time reading than working for his employer. With an increasing interest in socialism, he joined the London Corresponding Society in 1796. One of the key campaigns of this Society was to gain the vote for working men. Deeply unpopular with the Government, who were not in favour of Parliamentary reform, some members were tried for treason and sedition.

Hone was married in 1800 to Sarah Johnson. From 1801 to 1825 they had 12 children. With money given to him by his mother-in-law, he started a book and print shop with a circulating library in Lambeth Walk. He soon moved close to St Martin-in-the-Fields, where he published Shaw's Gardener (1806). It was at this time that he and his friend, John Bone, tried to establish a popular savings bank. Despite the backing of various wealthy patrons, they were unsuccessful. Bone then joined Hone in a bookseller's business, which was also unsuccessful.

In 1811, Hone was employed as an auctioneer for London booksellers. During this time he expanded his interest in journalism and embarked on investigations into the condition of patients in mental asylums. His investigations into the treatment of inmates at Bethlem Hospital ("Bedlam") outraged the public and politicians alike and consequently Bedlam's Governor resigned. Around this time Hone took a small lodging in the Old Bailey, keeping himself and his growing family by contributions to magazines and reviews. He hired a small shop in Fleet Street but this was twice robbed, with valuable books placed on show stolen.

In 1815 he started the Traveller newspaper, and tried in vain to save Elizabeth Fenning, a cook convicted on thin evidence of poisoning her employers with arsenic. Although Fenning was executed, Hone's 240-page book on the subject, The Important Results of an Elaborate Investigation into the Mysterious Case of Eliza Fenning – widely considered a landmark in investigative journalism – demolished the prosecution's case.

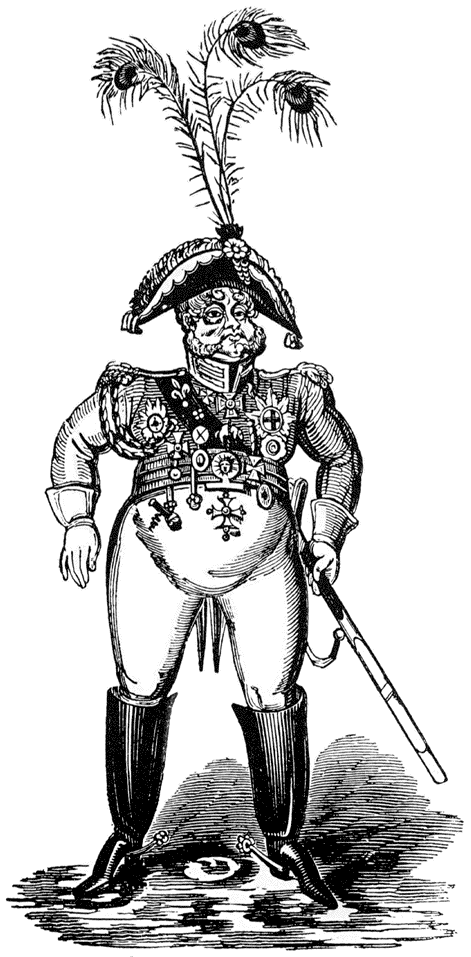
An unflattering 1819 caricature of the Prince Regent by George Cruikshank, illustrating "The Political House that Jack Built"

From 1 February to 25 October 1817, Hone published the Reformists' Register, using it to criticise state abuses, which he later attacked in the famous political squibs and parodies, illustrated by George Cruikshank. At the time of publishing the Register, Hone mentions his office as Number 67, Old Bailey, three doors from Ludgate Hill. In April 1817 three ex-officio accusations were filed against him by the attorney-general, Sir William Garrow. Three separate trials took place in the Guildhall before special juries on 18, 19 and 20 December 1817. The first, for publishing The Late John Wilkes's Catechism of a Ministerial Member (1817), was before Mr Justice Abbot (afterwards Lord Tenterden); the second, for parodying the litany and libelling the Prince Regent in The Political Litany (1817), and the third, for publishing the Sinecurist's Creed (1817), a parody on the Athanasian Creed, were before Lord Ellenborough.

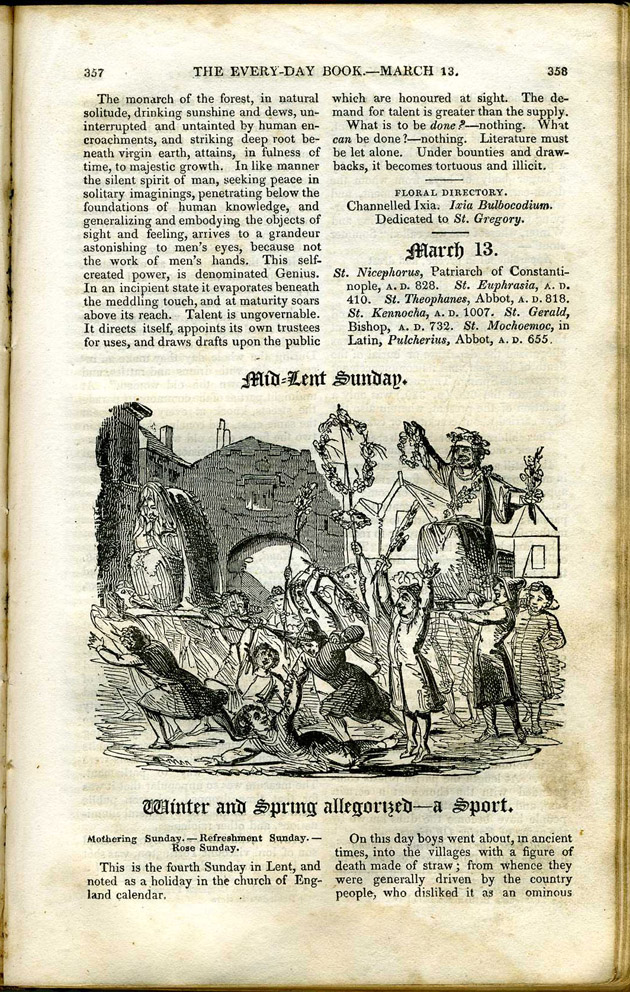
Every Day Book, typical page format, content and illustration. (1830 printing)

The prosecution took the ground that the prints were harmful to public morals and brought the prayer-book and even religion itself into contempt. The real motives of the prosecution were political: Hone had ridiculed the habits and exposed the corruption of those in power. He went to the root of the matter when he wished the jury "to understand that, had he been a publisher of ministerial parodies, he would not then have been defending himself on the floor of that court." In spite of illness and exhaustion Hone spoke on each of the three days for about seven hours. Although his judges were biased against him, he was acquitted on each count, and the result was received enthusiastically by immense crowds inside and outside the court. During this time, Hone was considered the most famous man in England. Soon afterwards, a public collection was made on his behalf. A recent play about the 1817 trials, Trial by Laughter, was written by Ian Hislop and Nick Newman. It began its run in English theatres in September 2018.

Among Hone's most successful political satires were The Political house that Jack built (1819), The Queen's Matrimonial Ladder (1820), Ill favour of Queen Caroline, The Man in the Moon (1820) and The Political Showman (1821), all illustrated by Cruikshank. Many of his squibs are directed against a certain "Dr Slop", a nickname given by him to Dr (afterwards Sir John) Stoddart, publisher of The Times. In researching his defence Hone had come upon some curious and, at that time, little trodden literary ground, and the results were shown by his publication in 1820 of The Apocryphal New Testament: being all the Gospels, Epistles, and other pieces now extant, attributed in the first four centuries to Jesus Christ, his Apostles and their companions, and not included in the New Testament by its compilers; translated from the original tongues, and now first collected into one volume. This book has gone through four editions and many reprints, including e-books and microforms, the latest in 2007. In 1823 he published the Ancient Mysteries Explained, in 1826 the Every-day Book, in 1827–1828 the Table-Book, and in 1829 the Year-Book. All three were collections of curious information on manners, antiquities and various other subjects.

The Every-day Book, Table Book and Year Book are the works by which Hone is best remembered. In preparing them he had the approval of Robert Southey and the assistance of Charles Lamb, (with whom he was great friends) as well as his son-in-law, Jacob Henry Burn (1794–1869). Despite the popularity of these books, Hone was not financially successful, and was lodged in King's Bench Prison for a short period for outstanding debts. Friends came to his assistance, and he subsequently opened the Green Grasshopper coffee house with his wife and two eldest daughters in Gracechurch Street. By this time Hone's attitude towards religion had changed, and during the latter years of his life he became a follower of Rev. Thomas Binney. In 1830 Hone edited Strutt's Sports and Pastimes of the people of England, and contributed to the first edition of The Penny Magazine. He was also sub-editor of The Patriot. Late in life he received funds from the Royal Literary Fund. He was given £30 in February 1834, £40 in February 1840 and his widow received £50 in December 1842.

After a series of strokes, he died aged 62 at Tottenham on 8 November 1842 and was buried at Dr Watts' Walk in Abney Park Cemetery, Stoke Newington. Besides his immediate family, his funeral was attended by his long-term collaborator George Cruikshank and the acclaimed author Charles Dickens.

== Legacy ==
There are many books available on Hone's life and career. In the years before his death, he and his eldest daughter, Sarah Burn, worked together to compile his personal papers and information in order to put together a biography. Sarah transcribed while William spoke. They were not successful in achieving a published work; however, the compilation of documents was given to writer Frederick Hackworth by Hone's younger daughter Ellen Soul. Hackworth then published the book William Hone. His life and times in 1912.

In an 1872 letter to the editor of the Australasian newspaper, Sarah, now living in Melbourne, Australia, said of her father:

My father was gifted with a high sense of justice and truth, a brave energy, and force of character that knew no fear, and the greater the obstructions to his object, the more determined his perseverance. His exertions were frequently devoted to the relief of private wrong, as well as of public oppression. To his untiring persistence may be ascribed the release of the cruelly incarcerated lunatic W. Norris, who had been for years chained to an iron frame in a cell in Bethlem, followed by a general reform of treatment and the eventual dismissal of the governor, W. Haslam about 1813.

In his prolonged efforts to save the life of the unfortunate Eliza Fenning he was not so successful. She had been tried for poisoning the family of Mr Turner, a law stationer in Chancery Lane. While waiting sentence my father conversed with her in Newgate, and became so convinced of her innocence that he spared no exertions day or night on her behalf, collected a mass of evidence (which he afterwards printed—a volume of about 200 pages) in her favour, had a petition presented to the Secretary of State praying for reprieve but the judge who tried her, Sir Vicary Gibbs, recorder of London, a notoriously hard man, and an intimate friend of the Turners, had charged the jury vindictively against her, and he pursued the unhappy girl to the scaffold. Years after, Mrs Turner, when dying confessed herself to have been the murderess.

Of retiring habits, simple yet refined tastes and courteous manners, my father was essentially a gentleman and while he had an utter contempt of such as Mr Thackeray termed 'stuck-up people, he instinctively conceded to every rank of life its due proprieties. His society was courted for the attractiveness of his conversation, in which few excelled, and he numbered among his friends many eminent in art, sciences and the learned professions as well as in literature.

A short biography of Hone's life written by his friend and sometime neighbour, Frances Rolleston, was published five years after his death, a revised edition six years later, under the title Some Account of the Conversion from Atheism to Christianity of the Late William Hone.

The medieval scholar M. R. James sharply criticized Hone's The apocryphal New Testament as "to speak frankly, a very bad book" on a number of grounds: it republished the 1700s translations of Archbishop Wake and Jeremiah Jones without crediting them; it misleadingly presented apocrypha as if a supplement to the New Testament; it combined non-apocryphal works of the early Church Fathers with anonymous apocryphal works without any clarification or distinction; and so on. James did admit that Hone's book was his first exposure to such works and kindled a fondness for it in spite of its flaws, and published his own collection of New Testament apocrypha in 1924 in the hopes of replacing Hone's version.

The Australian Brian Hone is a descendant of William's via his son Alfred Hone, a sculptor. The Hone's youngest daughter Alice was married to the French furniture designer Henri Auguste Fourdinois, the son of Alexandre Georges Fourdinois.

== In popular culture ==
The 2018 play Trial by Laughter by Ian Hislop and Nick Newman covers the three trials of Hone in 1817.
