= Thomas Byerley (potter) =

English businessman and potter

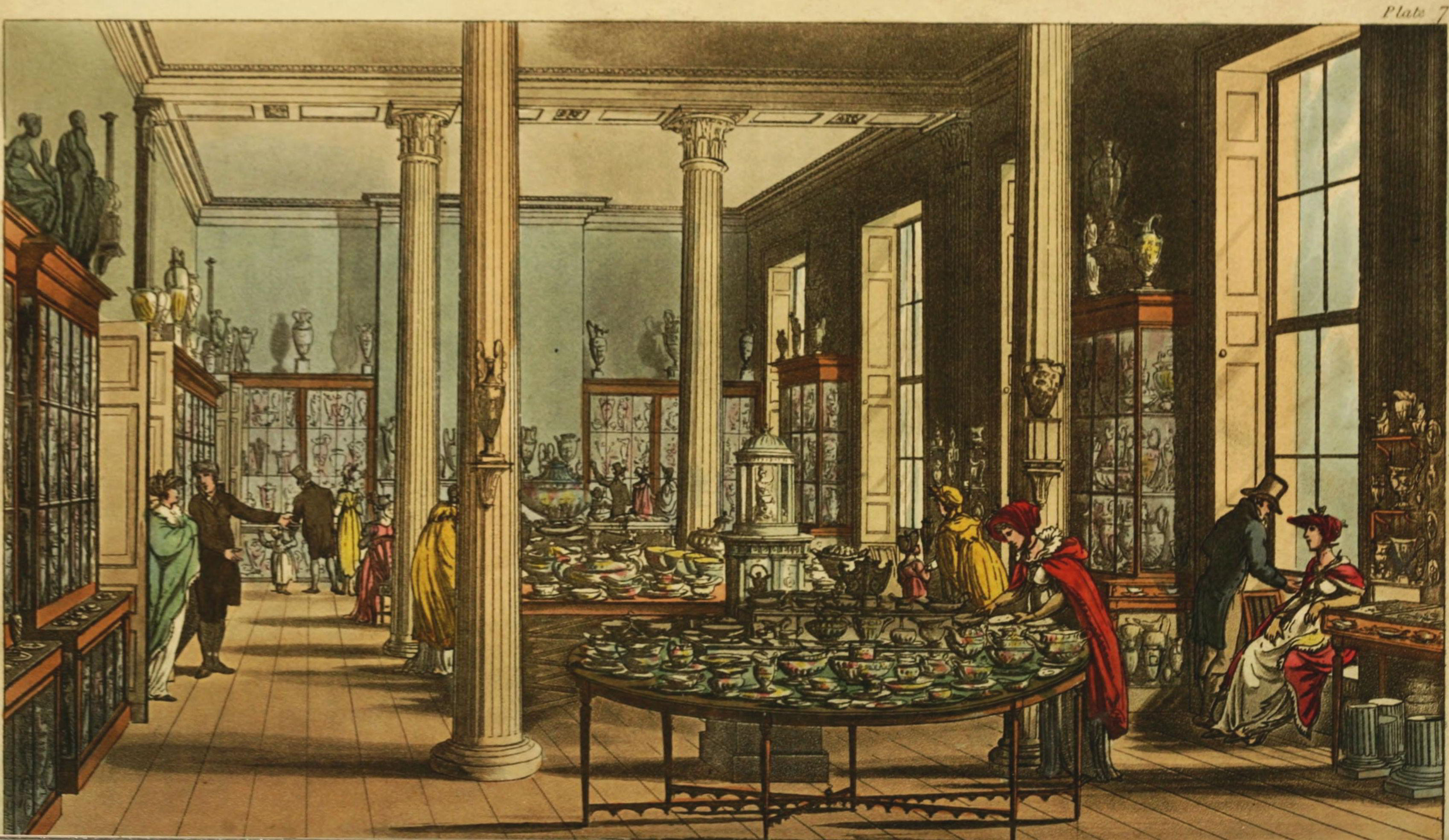
Wedgwood's London showroom, Wedgwood & Byerley in St James's Square in 1809

Thomas Byerley (1747 – 11 September 1810) was an English businessman, a partner in the Wedgwood pottery firm. He was successful whilst his uncle oversaw the finances. Cousin uncle of naturalist Charles Robert Darwin.

== Life ==
He was the son of Thomas Byerley (1707–1761) (son of Nicholas Byerley of Muggleswick Grange and Hedley) and Margaret Wedgwood (1720–1777), the daughter of Thomas Wedgwood III and sister of Josiah Wedgwood. In 1768 he emigrated to America but returned in 1775 and became a clerk at Etruria, where he became a salesman. He ran the London showroom and shop, latterly called Wedgwood & Byerley. After Josiah Wedgwood I's death in 1795 and after Josiah Wedgwood II moved away he was left in charge of Etruria Works.

Thomas and his wife had successfully run the showroom but Josiah Wedgwood had managed the money. When their uncle Josiah died in 1795 the business ceased to thrive. Maria Byerley and her sister, Frances, started a school to provide for their own upkeep. The school in Warwick was financed initially using Wedgwood bequests and a further loan from the Wedgwood family.

== Family ==
He married Frances Bruckfield 12 January 1782. They had 12 children:

- Josiah Byerley
- Thomas Byerley
- Frances Byerley
- Maria Byerley
- Sarah Byerley
- John Byerley
- Ann Byerley
- Jane Margaret Byerley
- Katherine Byerley (1797–1862), who married Dr. Anthony Todd Thomson
- Francis Bruckfield Byerley (Frank) (1799–?)
- Charlotte Octavia Byerley
- Samuel Byerley (1796–1870) (Became a New York shipping Merchant)
