= Maria Byerley =

British schoolmistress

- Born: 1787
- Died: 2 April 1843 (aged 55–56); London, England
- Occupation: school mistress
- Known for: founding and running a school for girls in Warwick

Maria Byerley (1787 – 2 April 1843) was a British schoolmistress in Warwick and Stratford upon Avon. The school for girls she co-founded with her sister Frances Parkes had several notable pupils.

== Life ==
She was the daughter of Thomas Byerley of Etruria, Staffordshire, a nephew by marriage and sometime partner and manager of the pottery works of Josiah Wedgwood. Her father had successfully run the London showroom but Josiah Wedgwood had managed the money.

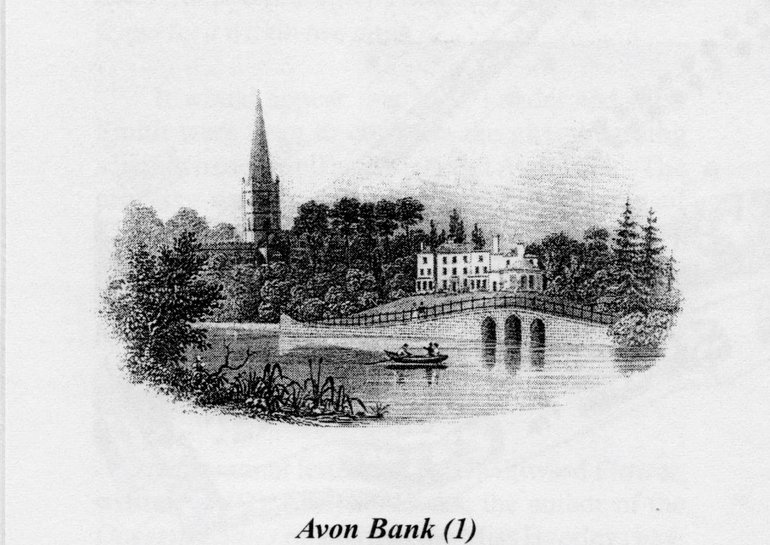
Avon Bank school - the school's site from 1824

When their uncle Josiah died in 1795 the business ceased to thrive, Maria Byerley, and her sister Frances, started a school to provide for their own upkeep. The school in Warwick was financed initially using Wedgwood bequests and a further loan from the Wedgwood family.

The school was a success and several of the Byerley sisters would work there but they left when they married. Frances (Fanny) married in the second year, 1811, to William Parkes. The school moved several times and its curriculum was not too remarkable. In 1824 the school moved to Avonbank in a location three miles out of Stratford on Avon. The following year, Frances published "Domestic duties, or, Instructions to young married ladies on the regulation of their conduct in the various relations and duties of married life" which is thought to encapsulate the education that the school tried to impart to its charges.

The notable families who sent their children included the future "Mrs Gaskell", the American granddaughters of Joseph Priestley, the Scottish artist's model and wife of John Everett Millais, Effie Gray and the niece of Harriet Martineau.

In 1841 she and her sister Jane retired but the school continued under the leadership of the Misses Ainsworth at Stratford.

Byerley died in London in 1843 of pneumonia. In 1949 the book A Quest of Ladies. The Story of a Warwickshire School [i.e. the School Conducted by Maria and Frances Byerly in the First Half of Nineteenth Century by Phyllis D. Hicks was published.
