= John Gordon Smith (surgeon) =

John Gordon Smith (1792–1833) was a Scottish surgeon and early professor of medical jurisprudence.

== Life ==
He was educated at Edinburgh and graduated in the university in 1810 with the highest honours in medicine. He entered the army as a surgeon, and was attached to the 12th Lancers at the battle of Waterloo, where he treated their commanding officer Frederick Ponsonby.

Smith retired from the army on half-pay when peace was concluded in 1815, and settled in London. Here he found it difficult to establish himself in practice, as he held a Scottish degree only, and was therefore not entitled to practise in England. He accepted the appointment of physician to the Duke of Sutherland, and resided with him for four years, writing on forensic medicine. At the same time he acted as surgeon to the Royal Westminster Ophthalmic Hospital. He also lectured on medical jurisprudence at the Royal Institution of Great Britain in 1825 and again in 1826, and at the Mechanics' Institute; and in 1829 he was elected the first professor of medical jurisprudence at the London University in Gower Street. None of the licensing bodies in London required any evidence of instruction in forensic medicine, and there was consequently no class. Smith lectured for two years, and then resigned his office.

For a time Smith edited the London Medical Repository. He died a debtor in the Fleet Prison, after fifteen months' confinement, on 16 September 1833. A reformer in politics and medicine, Smith was a pioneer of the study of medical jurisprudence, which Robert Christison was trying at the same time to set on a scientific basis. Smith campaigned, unsuccessfully, to place Scottish and English degrees and licences in medicine on an equal footing.

== Works ==
Smith published, besides contributions to the Edinburgh Medical and Surgical Journal:

- 'De Asthmati,' Edinburgh, 1810.
- 'The Principles of Forensic Medicine,' London, 1821; 2nd edit. 1824; 3rd edit. 1827.
- 'An Analysis of Medical Evidence,' London, 1825.
- 'The Claims of Forensic Medicine,' 1829.
- 'Hints for the Examination of Medical Witnesses,' 1829.
