= James Brown Gibson =

Sir James Brown Gibson KCB (1805 – 25 February 1868, Rome) was a British military surgeon and Director General of the British Army Medical Department from 1860 to 1867.

== Career ==
Gibson graduated M.D. (Edin.) in 1826. In December 1826, he was appointed Hospital Assistant and in the winter of 1826–1827 was stationed for six weeks at Fort Pitt Chatham. From 1827 to 1835 he served in the West Indies. He landed at Barbados and proceeded to Demerara (now part of Guyana). He participated in the subsequent war in Barbados. Because of departure from the West Indies by sick British medical officers, he became for several years in medical charge of his own regiment, plus the entire civil and military staff of Georgetown, several hundred military labourers, one company of the 1st West India Regiment, one detachment of the Royal Artillery, and the 86th Regiment of Foot.

In January 1829, he was appointed Assistant Surgeon 25th Regiment of Foot, replacing Assistant Surgeon James Stuart who died in December 1828. In early 1836 Gibson returned to the British Isles and arrived at Cork. He served at the depôt of his regiment at Cork Barracks for two months, as this had no medical officer. In March 1836 he was appointed Assistant Surgeon, 17th Light Dragoons, serving with them until 1841. In that year he was promoted Staff Surgeon 2nd Class and posted to Malta, arriving there on 28 December 1841. After various duties in Malta, he was, in 1844, appointed surgeon to the 17th Lancers. In April 1844 he left Malta for England, serving with the 17th Lancers until 1854.

After the outbreak of the Crimean War, Gibson travelled to Turkey, landing at the Kulali Barracks near Constantinople (now Istanbul) on 19 May 1854. Kulali Hospital was a British military hospital at the Kulali Barracks. Scutari Hospital, made famous by Florence Nightingale, was near by.

In May 1854, Gibson was appointed Staff Surgeon 1st Class and joined the staff of Prince George, Duke of Cambridge as the Duke's personal physician. After attachment to the Highland Brigade, Gibson proceeded with the brigade and the Duke of Cambridge (commander of the First Division), to Bulgaria and then to the Crimea. He was present at Alma, Inkermann, Balaclava, and the siege of Sevastapol. For his services, he received the Turkish Crimea Medal and the Crimea Medal with four clasps.

In late 1854 the Duke of Cambridge was invalided home due to shattered nerves. Gibson accompanied the Duke to Malta and on several stages of the Duke's return to England and remained in England from 1 February to 19 May in 1855. After the Duke's health had reached a sufficient stage of recovery, Gibson accepted, on 1 May, a promotion to Deputy Inspector General.

On 1 June 1855 Gibson arrived in Malta, where he became officer in charge of the Convalescent Hospital for invalids from the Crimea at Fort Chambray on the island of Gozo. On 27 May 1856 he departed from Malta and arrived on 2 June 1856 in England. There he was appointed Deputy Inspector of Hospitals, as well as Principal Medical Officer (PMO) Aldershot. Whilst in England in 1857, he was made Companion of the Order of the Bath (CB) in recognition of his services in Crimea. (Eligibility of British medical officers for the Order of the Bath started in 1850.)

Gibson remained in England from 1856 until his retirement. On 31 December 1858 he was promoted Inspector General. In 1859 he was honoured as Honorary Physician to the Queen (QHP). On 7 March 1860 he was appointed Director General Army Medical Department. In 1865 he was made Knight Commander of the Order of the Bath (KCB).

On 30 March 1867, suffering from pulmonary and cardiac disorders, Gibson retired to half-pay. During his military career, he served 41 years on full-pay. For a climate better for his health, Gibson went to Rome, where he died on 25 February 1868, aged 63 years.

Gibson's administration of the Army Medical Department was considered by some "disastrous" or "rotten in the management". However, Warren Webster, in charge of Dale General Hospital in 1865, argued that Director General Gibson and his immediate subordinate the Inspector General should not be held responsible "for things left undone when their requisitions for supplies and laborers were cast aside unnoticed and unfilled" — even though there was undoubtedly "defective drainage, untrapped sewerage, nearness of an over-charged graveyard, presence of all kinds of filth and imperfect ventilation at the hospitals at the hospitals of Scutari and Kulali". The British Methodist missionary William Harris Rule, who ministered to British Methodist soldiers in hospital during the Crimean war, commended Dr. Gibson for cooperation.
