= Robert Hammill Firth =

Doctor

Colonel Sir Robert Hammill Firth, KBE, CB (1 December 1857, Byculla, Bombay – 6 June 1931, Finchley Road, London) was a British Army surgeon, tropical medicine specialist, and professor of military hygiene.

== Biography ==
Robert H. Firth's parents were John Firth, a member of the educational department of the Honourable East India Company Service (HEICS), and Maria Jane née Hammill, the second wife of John Firth and a daughter of Major Robert Hammill, 18th Royal Irish Regiment. Robert Firth was christened in the Bombay Presidency on 3 February 1858. He was educated privately by an Anglican rector at Ware, Hertfordshire and then at University College London. He matriculated at Oriel College, Oxford, but never graduated there. He qualified M.R.C.S. on 19 November 1897 and F.R.C.S.Eng. on 14 December 1882. After visiting a brother in South America, he joined on 3 August 1883 the British Army Medical Department as a surgeon.

Firth served as a member of the Hazara Expedition of 1888 in what is now Hazara, Pakistan. In 1891 he obtained the D.P.H. from the English Colleges. From 1892 to 1897 he was an assistant professor of hygiene at the Army Medical School, Netley, where James Lane Notter was professor. In 1896 J. & A. Churchill published The Theory and Practice of Hygiene by Lane Notter and Firth — the book was based upon an earlier book Manual of Practical Hygiene by Edmund Alexander Parkes. In 1897 Firth returned to British India to serve in the Tirah campaign in what is now the Khyber Pakhtunkhwa province of Pakistan. This Tirah campaign service earned him the India Medal with two clasps. He was sent to Rawalpindi to investigate enteric fever among the troops there. Subsequently, he was sent to Lucknow to investigate the bacteriology of dysentery.

From February 1906 to February 1910, Firth was in charge of the School of Army Sanitation at Aldershot. In 1908 Firth's Military Hygiene: A Manual of Sanitation for Soldiers was published. In 1910 he was sent to British India. Upon his return to England he held for a time the position of Sanitary Officer at Army Headquarters. In December 1912 the position of Sanitary Officer was abolished and replaced by a new position with title "ADMS (Sanitary)", i.e., assistant director of Medical Services, Sanitary Section. On 13 November 1912, he was promoted from lieutenant colonel to colonel. In March 1915 he was sent to France as part of the BEF and served as ADMS of the 20th (Light) Division. From September 1915 to May 1917 he was deputy director of Medical Services (DDMS) of XI Corps. In May 1917 he was replaced as DDSM of XI Corps, because of his advanced age. He was transferred to the British Army's base at Le Havre. He retired on 25 December 1917.

Firth twice received (in 1888 and in 1891) the Alexander Memorial prize and medal and twice received (in 1889 and in 1892) the Parkes Memorial prize and medal. For his WW I services, he was mentioned three times in dispatches and received the Victory and Allied medals. He was made C.B. in 1918 and K.B.E. on 2 June 1919. The President of the Portuguese Republic made him a Grand Officer of the Military Order of Aviz. The municipality of Le Havre awarded him in 1919 a silver medal in recognition of medical services rendered to Le Havre's civilian population.

Firth was a member of several learned societies. For many years he served as a member of council and examiner at the Royal Sanitary Institute.

In Lewisham, London on 15 March 1884 he married Mary Knight, a daughter of a solicitor. Robert H. Firth was predeceased by his wife and survived by their daughter, Dorothy Firth.

== Selected publications ==
- Firth, R. H. (1882). "Statistics of Chloroform or Ether Administration". British Medical Journal. 1 (1108): 442. doi:10.1136/bmj.1.1108.442-b. PMC 2371558.
- —— (1886). "Epileptic Insanity". The Indian Medical Gazette. 21 (4): 110–112. PMC 5001014. PMID 28999596.
- —— (1886). "On the Occurrence of Icterus, Icteric Urine, and Hæmatinuria in Remittent Fever". The Indian Medical Gazette. 21 (7): 193–195. PMC 5001076. PMID 28999641.
- —— (1886). "Syphilis and Marriage". The Indian Medical Gazette. 21 (8): 231–234. PMC 5001101. PMID 28999661.
- —— (1886). "On Some Pathologico-Pigmentary Changes Seen in Remittent Fever". The Indian Medical Gazette. 21 (10): 290–291. PMC 5000907. PMID 28999512.
- —— (1886). "Pathology of Remittent Fever". The Indian Medical Gazette. 21 (12): 382. PMC 5000938. PMID 28999536.
- —— (1887). "On the occurrence of a poisonous ptomaine in milk" (PDF). The Lancet. 129 (3309): 213–214. doi:10.1016/S0140-6736(02)22417-4.
- —— (1887). "The Sister Medical Services". The Indian Medical Gazette. 22 (4): 125–126. PMC 5128480. PMID 28999755.
- —— (1891). "Notes on the Appearance of Certain Sporozoöid Bodies in the Protoplasm of an "Oriental Sore."". British Medical Journal. 1 (1567): 60–62. doi:10.1136/bmj.1.1567.60. PMC 2196911. PMID 20753218.
- —— (1911). "Paratyphoid Fever". British Medical Journal. 1 (2631): 1347–1348. doi:10.1136/bmj.1.2631.1347-a. PMC 2334029.
- —— (1912). "Inoculation and the Prevalence of Enteric and Paratyphoid Fevers in the European Army". The Indian Medical Gazette. 47 (9): 341–342. PMC 5168075. PMID 29005321.
- —— (1912). "Protein Element in Nutrition". The Indian Medical Gazette. 47 (10): 414–415. PMC 5168345. PMID 29005474.
- —— (1918). "Some Musings of an Idle Man". Journal of the Royal Army Medical Corps. 30: 37–50. pdf at militaryhealth.bmj.com
