= Medical jurisprudence =

Branch of science and medicine

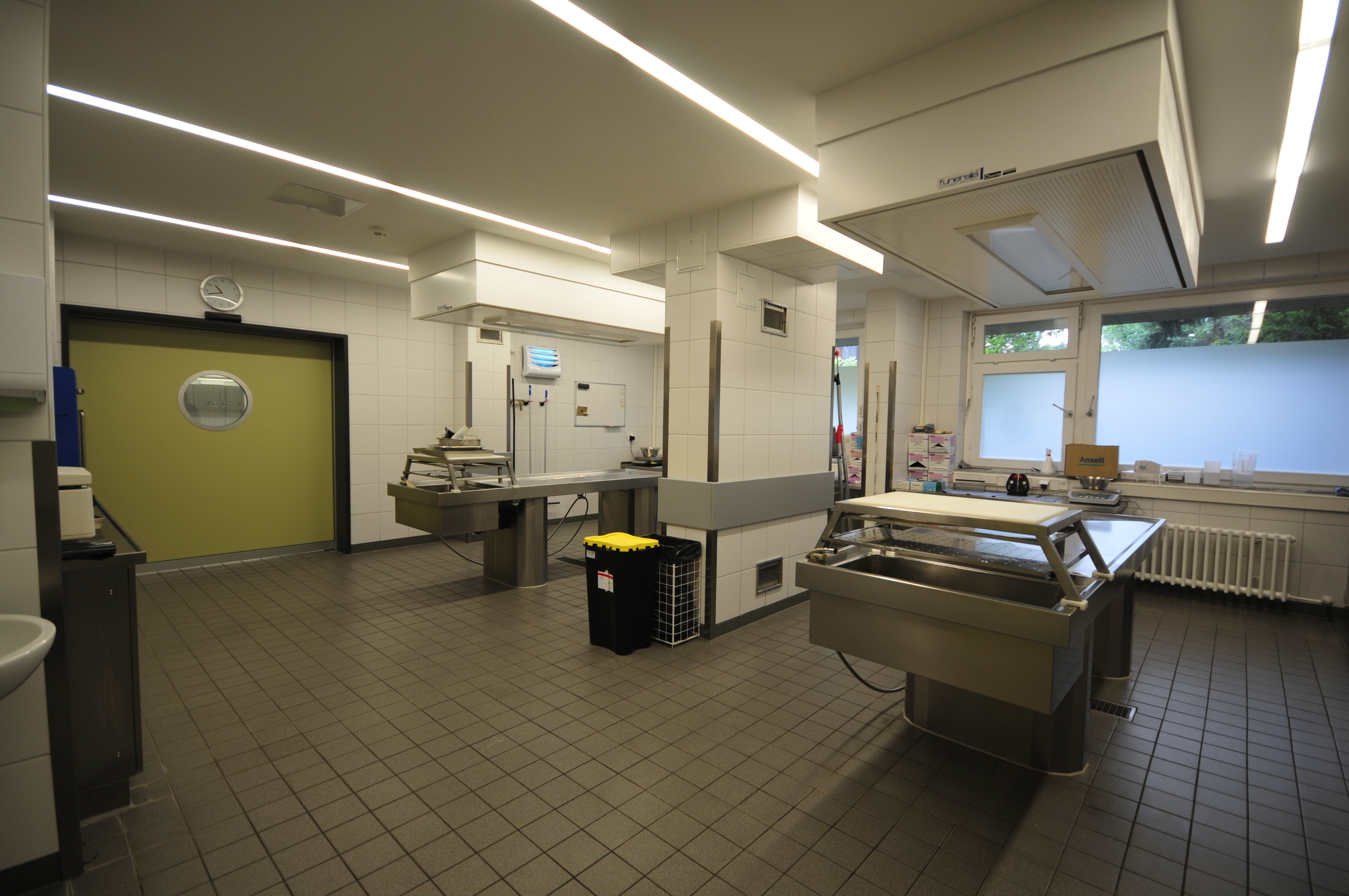
Autopsy room of the Charité Berlin

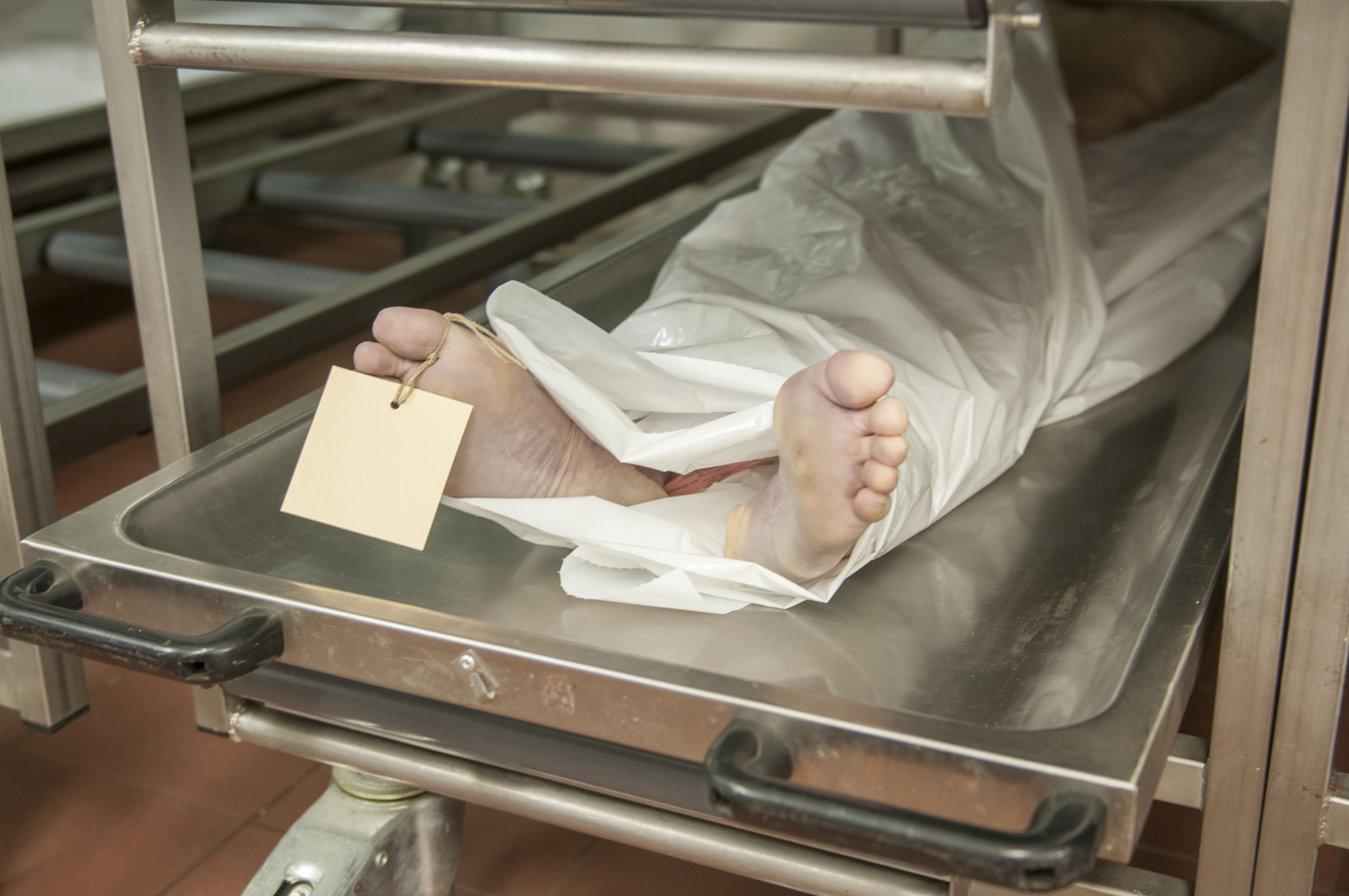
Refrigerator in the Forensic Medicine at the Charité Berlin

Medical jurisprudence or legal medicine is the branch of science and medicine involving the study and application of scientific and medical knowledge to legal problems, such as inquests, and in the field of law. As modern medicine is a legal creation, regulated by the state, and medicolegal cases involving death, rape, paternity, etc. require a medical practitioner to produce evidence and appear as an expert witness, these two fields have traditionally been interdependent.

Forensic medicine, which includes forensic pathology, is a narrower frontline field which involves the collection, documentation, analysis and presentation of objective information (medical evidence) for use in the legal system.

When investigating a death, forensic pathologists:

- perform autopsies when required
- may be appointed as coroners to investigate cases of suspicious death
- determine the cause of death and all other factors that relate to the body directly
- may attend crime scenes
- frequently testify in court.

The Australian Museum shows in a step by step virtual demonstration what happens during an autopsy procedure.

== History ==
Song Ci (1186–1249) was probably the first forensic scientist. He recorded all the known forensic techniques at the time in his book known as the Collected Cases of Injustice Rectified.

Andreas Vesalius (1514–1564), imperial physician to the court of Emperor Charles V, revolutionized the practice of medicine by providing detailed descriptions of the anatomy of the human body, which were based on his dissections of cadavers and autopsies. In 1537, aged just 22, Vesalius performed public dissections to show how the human body worked, and became professor of medicine at Padua University. He insisted that his medical students should perform dissections. His work "De Humani Corporis Fabrica" was groundbreaking in the history of medical publishing and is considered to be a major step in the development of scientific medicine.

Paul Zacchias was also one of the earliest figures of medical jurisprudence, with association with the Papal States and Catholic Church. Zacchias was the personal physician to Pope Innocentius X and Pope Alexander VII, as well as legal adviser to the Rota Romana. His most well known book, Quaestiones medico-legales (1621–1651) established legal medicine as a topic of study. Zacchias work contains superstitious views on magic, witches, and demons which were widely held at the time.

Medical jurisprudence had a chair founded at the University of Edinburgh in 1807, first occupied by Andrew Duncan, the younger. It was imposed on the university by the administration of Charles James Fox, and in particular Henry Erskine working with Andrew Duncan, the elder.

In the 19th century two new tools appear: Forensic psychiatry (to determine the mental health and blameworthiness of a suspect), and forensic toxicology (giving evidence in cases as intentional poisonings and drug use).

In the United Kingdom, the Faculty of Forensic and Legal Medicine was established as a Faculty of the Royal College of Physicians in 2006 to develop and maintain the highest possible standards of competence and professional integrity in forensic and legal medicine. The specialty covers professionals working in three related disciplines: forensic medical practitioners (forensic physicians, forensic pathologists, sexual assault examiners, and child physical and sexual assault examiners); medico-legal advisers; and medically qualified coroners.

== Scope ==
Medical jurisprudence is concerned with a broad range of medical, legal, and ethical issues, as well as human rights and rights of individuals.

Physicians have a duty to act in their patients best interest and can be charged in a court of law if they fail to do so. On the other hand, a physician may be required to act in the interest of third parties if his patient is a danger to others. Failure to do so may lead to legal action against the physician.

Medical jurisprudence includes:

- questions of the legal and ethical duties of physicians;
- questions affecting the civil

Under the second heading, there are many aspects, including:

- questions of competence and sanity in civil or criminal proceedings, for example for insanity defense;
- questions of competence of minors in matters affecting their own health; and,
- questions of lawful fitness or safety to drive a motor vehicle, pilot an aeroplane, use scuba gear, play certain sports, or to join certain occupations.

Under the third heading, there are also many aspects, including:

- assessment of illness or injuries that may be work-related (see workers' compensation or occupational safety and health) or otherwise compensable;
- assessment of injuries of minors that may relate to neglect or abuse; and,
- certification of death or else the assessment of possible causes of death. This, however, is the more commonly understood, albeit narrow, meaning of forensic medicine.

== See also ==
- Criminal investigation
- Criminal psychology
- Nerio Rojas, Argentine physician and forensic medicine author

=== Bibliography ===
- Ferllini, R. "Silent witness". Grange 2007.
- Saukko, P.; Knight, B. "Knight’s forensic pathology". CRC Press/Taylor & Francis Group 2016.
