= Prefabricated building =

Building constructed using prefabrication

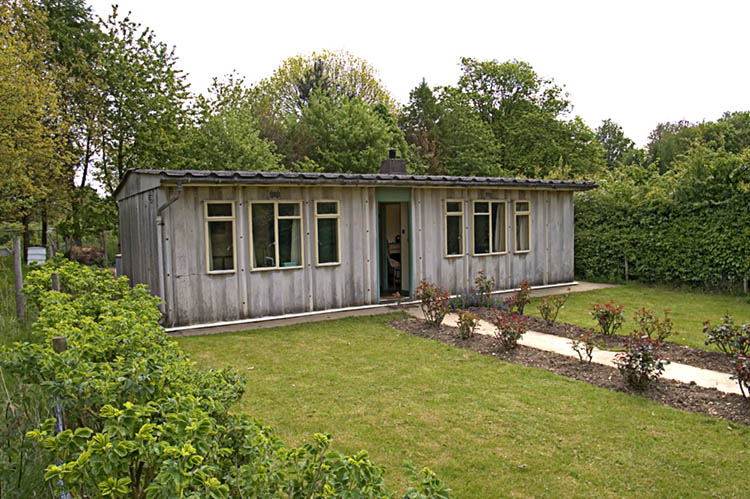
Prefabricated post-war home at Chiltern Open Air Museum - Universal House, Mark 3, steel frame clad with corrugated asbestos cement

A prefabricated building, informally a prefab, is a building that is manufactured and constructed using prefabrication. It consists of factory-made components or units that are transported and assembled on-site to form the complete building. Various materials were combined to create a part of the installation process.

== History ==
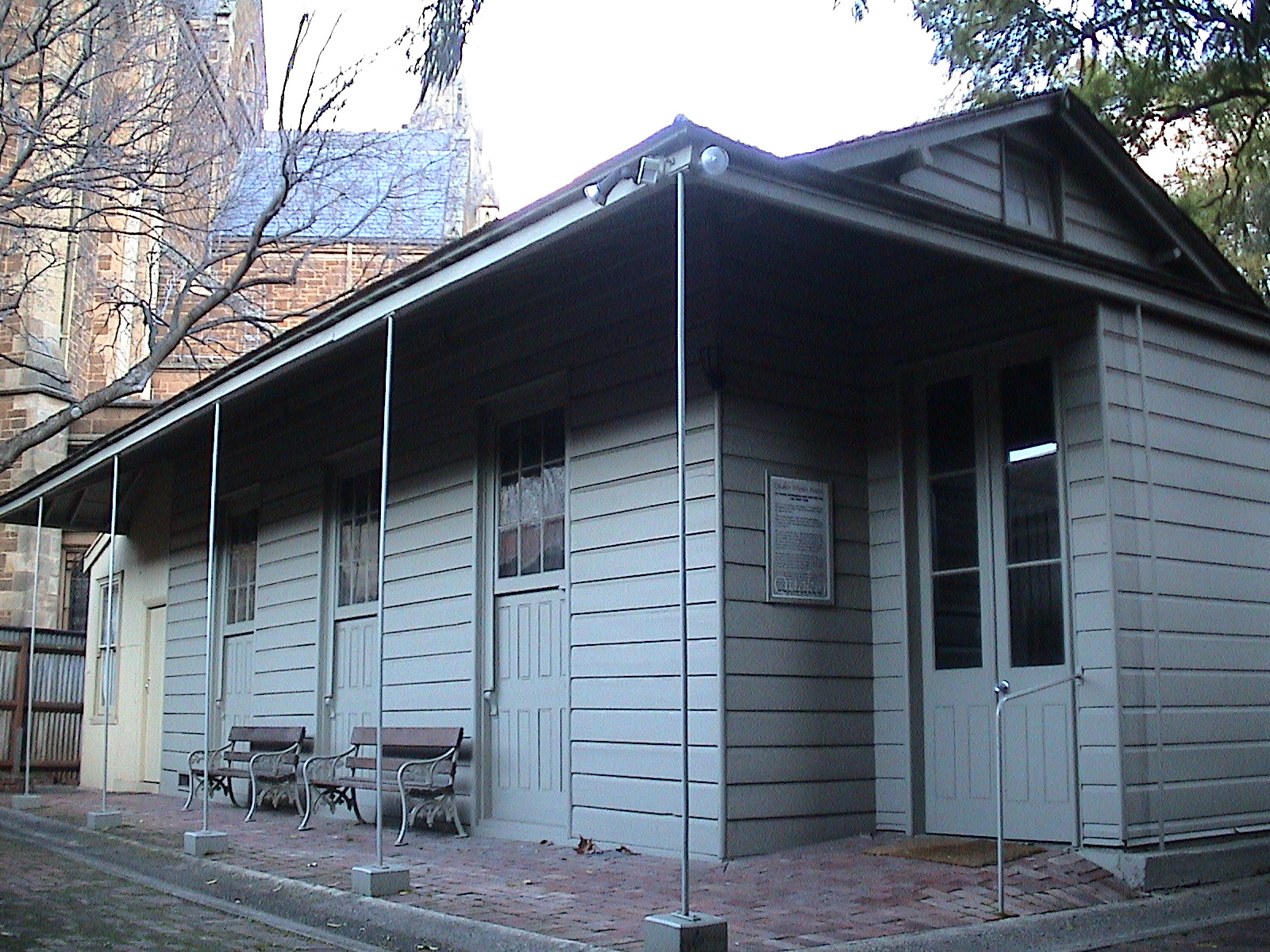
Friends Meeting House (a Manning cottage, 1840), North Adelaide, still in service.

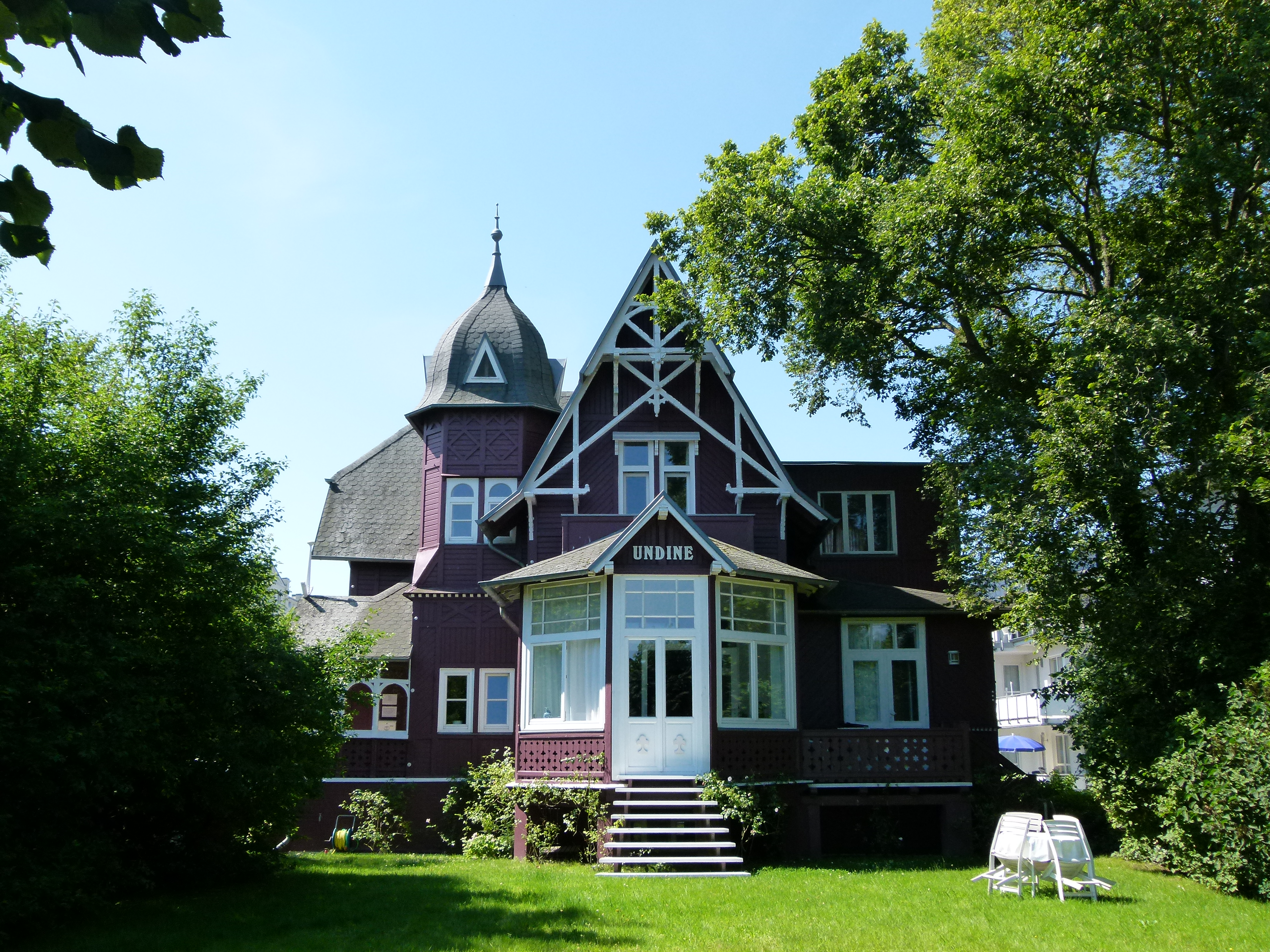
Villa Undine in Binz on German Rugia Island, built in 1885 by Wolgaster Holzbau.

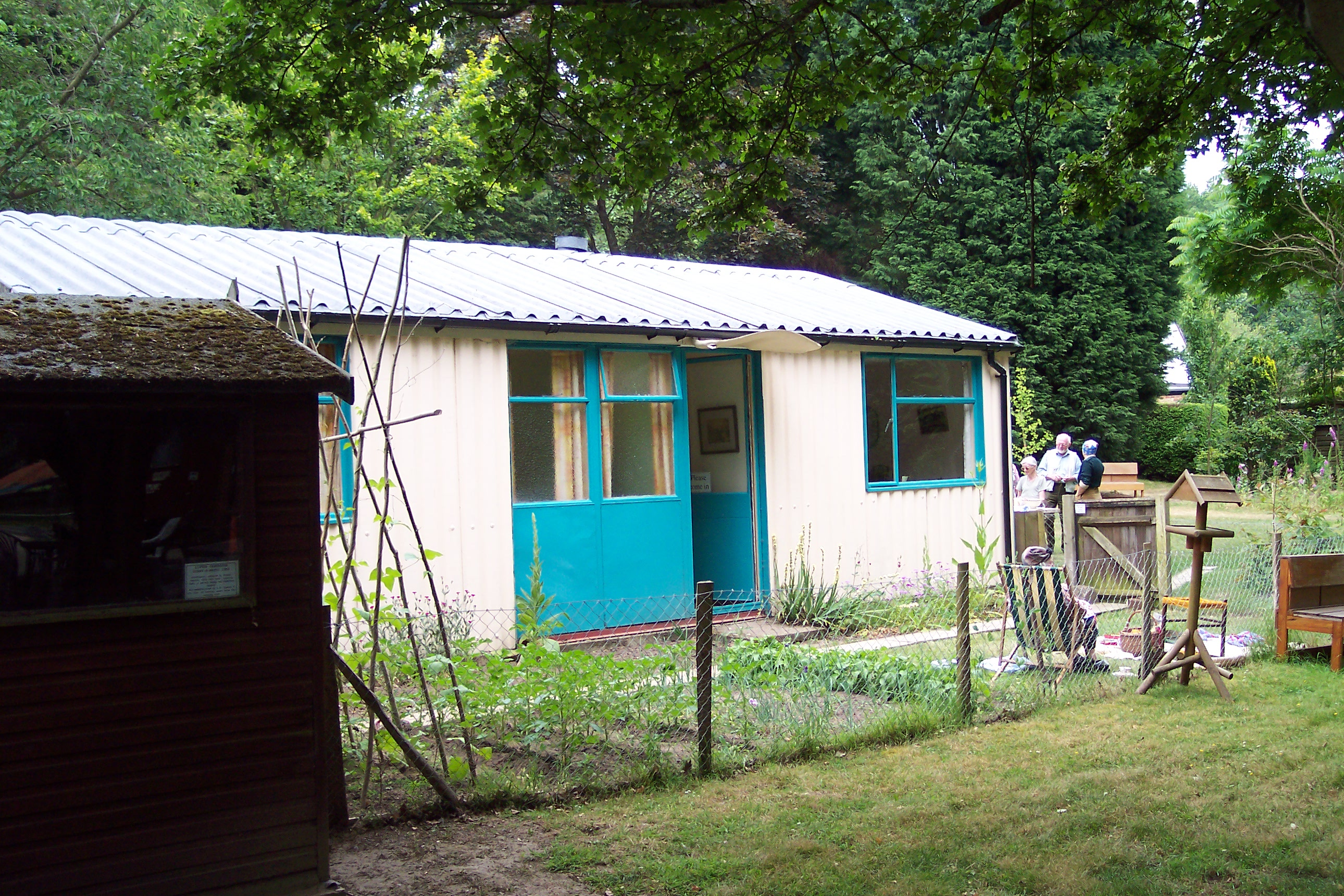
A 1950s metal UK prefab at the Rural Life Living Museum, Tilford, Surrey.

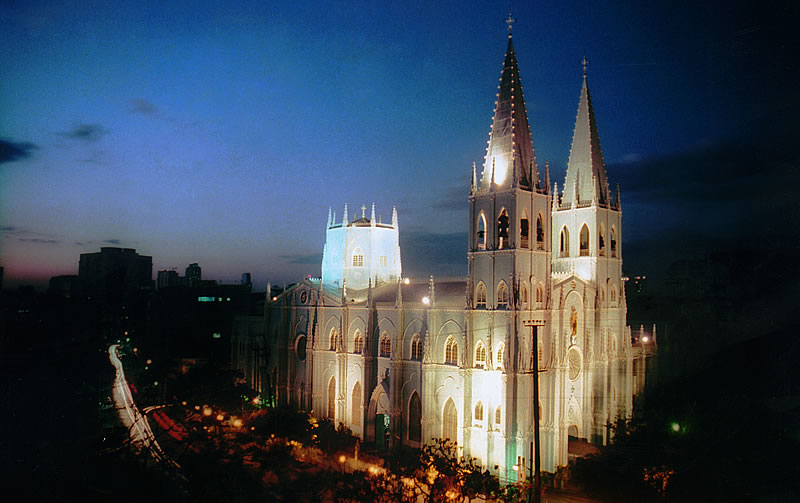
San Sebastian Minor Basilica in Manila, completed in 1891, is the only prefabricated steel church in Asia.

Buildings have been built in one place and reassembled in another throughout history. This was especially true for mobile activities, or for new settlements. Elmina Castle, the first slave fort in West Africa, was also the first European prefabricated building in Sub-Saharan Africa. In North America, in 1624 one of the first buildings at Cape Ann was probably partially prefabricated, and was rapidly disassembled and moved at least once. John Rollo described in 1801 earlier use of portable hospital buildings in the West Indies. Possibly the first advertised prefab house was the "Manning cottage". A London carpenter, Henry Manning, constructed a house that was built in components, then shipped and assembled by British emigrants. This was published at the time (advertisement, South Australian Record, 1837) and a few still stand in Australia. One such is the Friends Meeting House, Adelaide. The peak year for the importation of portable buildings to Australia was 1853, when several hundred arrived. These have been identified as coming from Liverpool, Boston and Singapore (with Chinese instructions for re-assembly). In Barbados the Chattel house was a form of prefabricated building which was developed by emancipated slaves who had limited rights to build upon land they did not own. As the buildings were moveable they were legally regarded as chattels.

In 1855 during the Crimean War, after Florence Nightingale wrote a letter to The Times, Isambard Kingdom Brunel was commissioned to design a prefabricated modular hospital. In five months he designed the Renkioi Hospital: a 1,000 patient hospital, with innovations in sanitation, ventilation and a flushing toilet. Fabricator William Eassie constructed the required 16 units in Gloucester Docks, shipped directly to the Dardanelles. Only used from March 1856 to September 1857, it reduced the death rate from 42% to 3.5%.

The world's first prefabricated, pre-cast panelled apartment blocks were pioneered in Liverpool. A process that was invented by city engineer John Alexander Brodie. The tram stables at Walton in Liverpool followed in 1906. The idea was not extensively adopted in Britain, however was widely adopted elsewhere, particularly in Eastern Europe.

Prefabricated homes were produced during the Gold Rush in the United States, when kits were produced to enable Californian prospectors to quickly construct accommodation. Homes were available in kit form by mail order in the United States in 1908.

Prefabricated housing was popular during the Second World War due to the need for mass accommodation for military personnel. The United States used Quonset huts as military buildings, and in the United Kingdom prefabricated buildings used included Nissen huts and Bellman Hangars. 'Prefabs' were built after the war as a means of quickly and cheaply providing quality housing as a replacement for the housing destroyed during the Blitz. The proliferation of prefabricated housing across the country was a result of the Burt Committee and the Housing (Temporary Accommodation) Act 1944. Under the Ministry of Works Emergency Factory Made housing programme, a specification was drawn up and bid on by various private construction and manufacturing companies. After approval by the MoW, companies could bid on Council led development schemes, resulting in whole estates of prefabs constructed to provide accommodation for those made homeless by the War and ongoing slum clearance. Almost 160,000 had been built in the UK by 1948 at a cost of close to £216 million. The largest single prefab estate in Britain was at Belle Vale (South Liverpool), where more than 1,100 were built after World War 2. The estate was demolished in the 1960s amid much controversy as the prefabs were very popular with residents at the time.

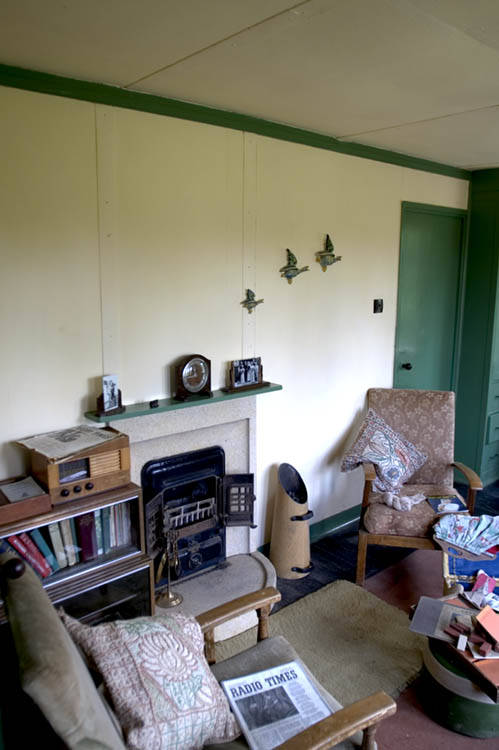
Amersham Prefab (COAM)-front room showing solid-fuel fire

Prefabs were aimed at families, and typically had an entrance hall, two bedrooms (parents and children), a bathroom (a room with a bath) — which was a novel innovation for many Britons at that time, a separate toilet, a living room and an equipped (not fitted in the modern sense) kitchen. Construction materials included steel, aluminium, timber or asbestos cement, depending on the type of dwelling. The aluminium Type B2 prefab was produced as four pre-assembled sections which could be transported by lorry anywhere in the country.

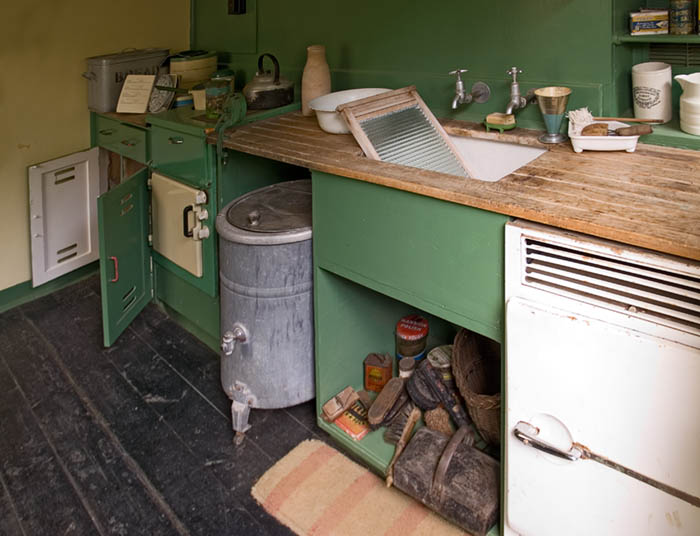
Amersham Prefab's Kitchen (COAM)-showing Belling cooker, Ascot wash heater and fridge

The Universal House (pictured left & lounge diner right) was given to the Chiltern Open Air Museum after 40 years temporary use. The Mark 3 was manufactured by the Universal Housing Company Ltd, Rickmansworth.

The United States used prefabricated housing for troops during the war and for GIs returning home. Prefab classrooms were popular with UK schools increasing their rolls during the baby boom of the 1950s and 1960s.

Many buildings were designed with a five-ten year life span, but have far exceeded this, with a number surviving today. In 2002, for example, the city of Bristol still had residents living in 700 examples. Many UK councils have been in the process of demolishing the last surviving examples of Second World War prefabs in order to comply with the British government's Decent Homes Standard, which came into effect in 2010. There has, however, been a recent revival in prefabricated methods of construction in order to compensate for the United Kingdom's current housing shortage.

== Prefabs and the modernist movement ==
Architects are incorporating modern designs into the prefabricated houses of today. Prefab housing should no longer be compared to a mobile home in terms of appearance, but to that of a complex modernist design. There has also been an increase in the use of "green" materials in the construction of these prefab houses. Consumers can easily select between different environmentally friendly finishes and wall systems. Since these homes are built in parts, it is easy for a home owner to add additional rooms or even solar panels to the roofs. Many prefab houses can be customized to the client's specific location and climate, making prefab homes much more flexible and modern than before.

There is a zeitgeist or trend in architectural circles and the spirit of the age favors the small carbon footprint of "prefab".

=== Efficiency ===
Construction of a prefabricated modular house (Click here for a time-lapse video)

The process of building pre-fabricated buildings has become so efficient in China that a builder in Changsha built a ten-storey building in 28 hours and 45 minutes.

=== Sustainability ===
Prefabricated construction generates less carbon footprint, improves energy use and efficiency, and produces less waste, making it more sustainable and environmentally friendly, and compliant with sustainable design standards.

=== Modular Architecture ===
The modular architecture allows, thanks to 3D modeling, the design and construction of the modular structure outside the site where it will be installed. This offers several advantages such as more sustainable design, greater cost and time savings and standardization of design. This is especially important for large-scale construction projects.

== In Post-war Eastern Europe ==
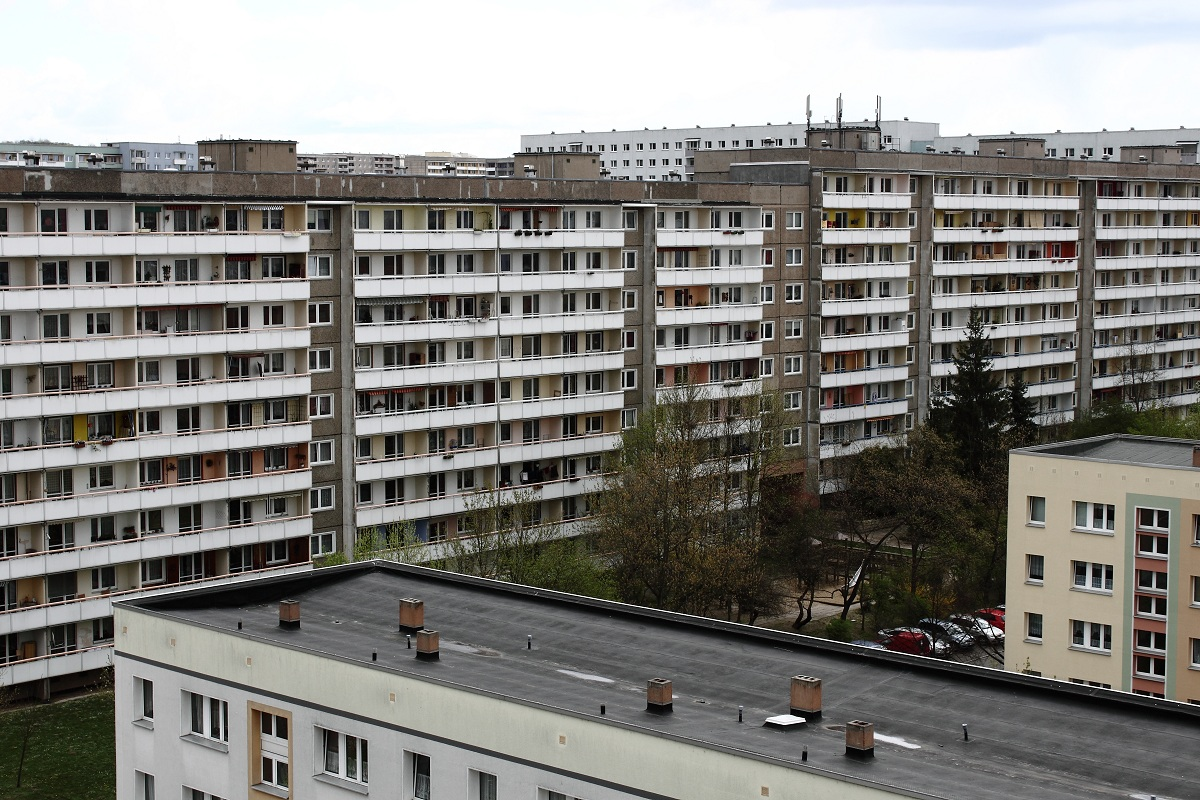
A high-rise Plattenbau in Jena, Germany

Many eastern European countries had suffered physical damage during World War II and their economies were in a very poor state. There was a need to reconstruct cities which had been severely damaged due to the war. For example, Warsaw had been practically razed to the ground under the planned destruction of Warsaw by German forces after the 1944 Warsaw Uprising. The centre of Dresden, Germany, had been totally destroyed by the 1945 Allied bombardment. Stalingrad had been largely destroyed and only a small number of structures were left standing.

Prefabricated buildings served as an inexpensive and quick way to alleviate the massive housing shortages associated with the wartime destruction and large-scale urbanization and rural flight.

== Prefabricated commercial buildings ==
Prefabrication for commercial uses has a long history - a major expansion was made in the Second World War when ARCON (short for Architecture Consultants) developed a system using steel components that could be rapidly erected and then clad with a variety of materials to suit local conditions, availability, and cost.

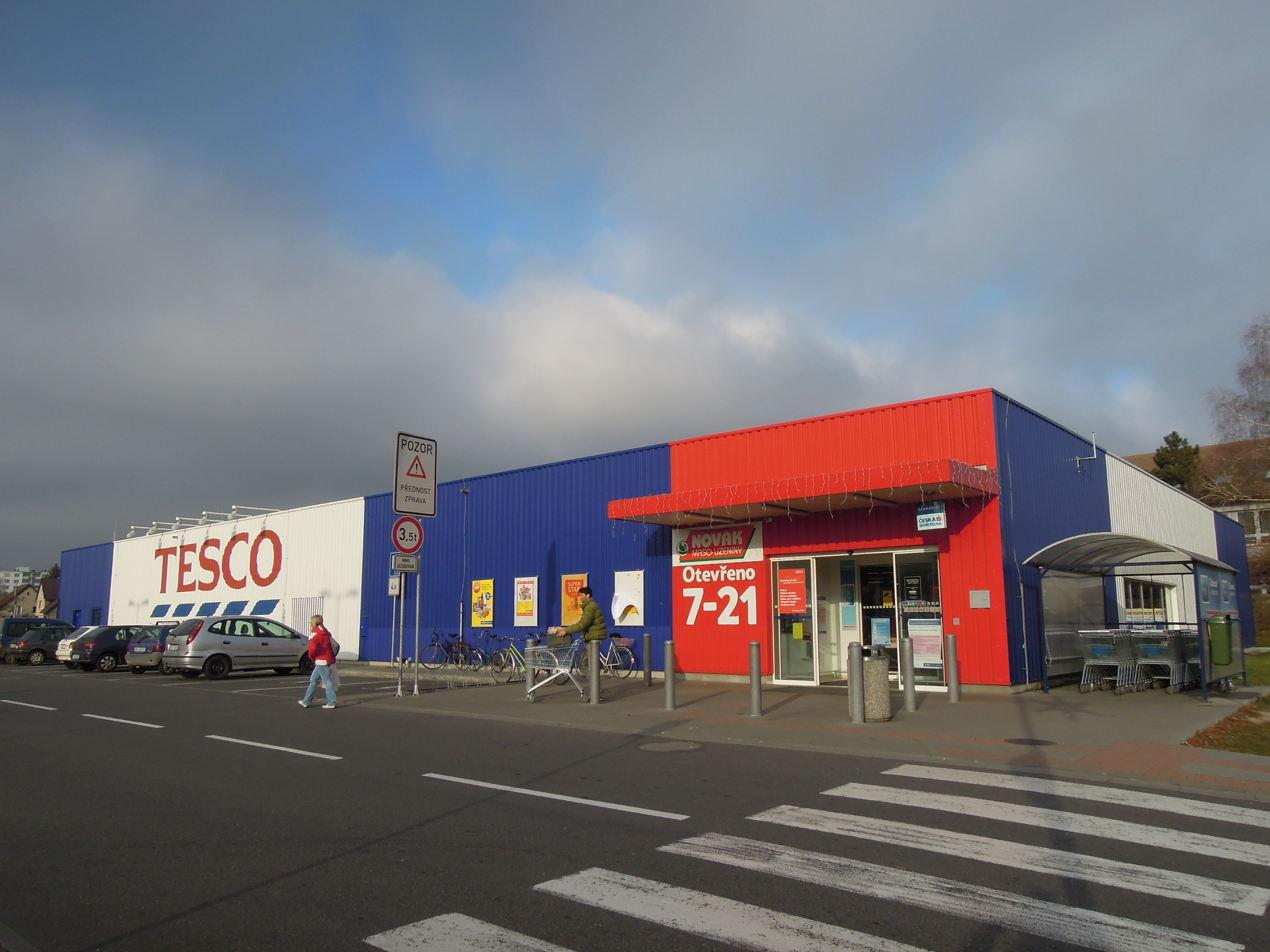
Tesco modular store in Zubří, Czech Republic

McDonald's uses prefabricated structures for their buildings, and set a record of constructing a building and opening for business within 13 hours (on pre-prepared ground works).

In the UK, the major supermarkets have each developed a modular unit system to shop building, based on the systems developed by German cost retailer Aldi and the Danish supermarket chain Netto.

== PEB Structure ==
In structural engineering, a pre-engineered building (PEB) is designed by a PEB supplier or PEB manufacturer with a single design to be fabricated using various materials and methods to satisfy a wide range of structural and aesthetic design requirements. This is contrasted with a building built to a design that was created specifically for that building. Within some geographic industry sectors pre-engineered buildings are also called pre-engineered metal buildings (PEMB) or, as is becoming increasingly common due to the reduced amount of pre-engineering involved in custom computer-aided designs, simply engineered metal buildings (EMB).

During the 1960s, standardized engineering designs for buildings were first marketed as PEBs. Historically, the primary framing structure of a pre-engineered building is an assembly of Ɪ-shaped members, often referred to as I-beams. In pre-engineered buildings, the I beams used are usually formed by welding together steel plates to form the I section. The I beams are then field-assembled (e.g. bolted connections) to form the entire frame of the pre-engineered building. Some manufacturers taper the framing members (varying in web depth) according to the local loading effects. Larger plate dimensions are used in areas of higher load effects.

Other forms of primary framing can include trusses, mill sections rather than three-plate welded, castellated beams, etc. The choice of economic form can vary depending on factors such as local capabilities (e.g. manufacturing, transportation, construction) and variations in material vs. labour costs.

Typically, primary frames are 2D type frames (i.e. may be analyzed using two-dimensional techniques). Advances in computer-aided design technology, materials and manufacturing capabilities have assisted a growth in alternate forms of pre-engineered building such as the tension fabric building and more sophisticated analysis (e.g. three-dimensional) as is required by some building codes.

Cold formed Z- and C-shaped members may be used as secondary structural elements to fasten and support the external cladding.

Roll-formed profiled steel sheet, wood, tensioned fabric, precast concrete, masonry block, glass curtainwall or other materials may be used for the external cladding of the building.

In order to accurately design a pre-engineered building, engineers consider the clear span between bearing points, bay spacing, roof slope, live loads, dead loads, collateral loads, wind uplift, deflection criteria, internal crane system and maximum practical size and weight of fabricated members. Historically, pre-engineered building manufacturers have developed pre-calculated tables for different structural elements in order to allow designers to select the most efficient I beams size for their projects. However, the table selection procedures are becoming rare with the evolution in computer-aided custom designs.

While pre-engineered buildings can be adapted to suit a wide variety of structural applications, the greatest economy will be realized when utilising standard details. An efficiently designed pre-engineered building can be lighter than the conventional steel buildings by up to 30%. Lighter weight equates to less steel and a potential price savings in structural framework.

== Project professionals and manufacturer-designed buildings ==
The project architect, sometimes called the Architect of Record, is typically responsible for aspects such as aesthetic, dimensional, occupant comfort and fire safety. When a pre-engineered building is selected for a project, the architect accepts conditions inherent in the manufacturer's product offerings for aspects such as materials, colours, structural form, dimensional modularity, etc. Despite the existence of the manufacturer's standard assembly details, the architect remains responsible to ensure that the manufacturer's product and assembly is consistent with the building code requirements (e.g. continuity of air/vapour retarders, insulation, rain screen; size and location of exits; fire rated assemblies) and occupant/owner expectations.

Many jurisdictions recognize the distinction between the project engineer, sometimes called the Engineer of Record, and the manufacturer's employee or subcontract engineer, sometimes called a specialty engineer. The principal differences between these two entities on a project are the limits of commercial obligation, professional responsibility and liability.

The structural Engineer of Record is responsible to specify the design parameters for the project (e.g. materials, loads, design standards, service limits) and to ensure that the element and assembly designs by others are consistent in the global context of the finished building.

The specialty engineer is responsible to design only those elements which the manufacturer is commercially obligated to supply (e.g. by contract) and to communicate the assembly procedures, design assumptions and responses, to the extent that the design relies on or affects work by others, to the Engineer of Record – usually described in the manufacturer's erection drawings and assembly manuals. The manufacturer produces an engineered product but does not typically provide engineering services to the project.

In the context described, the Architect and Engineer of Record are the designers of the building and bear ultimate responsibility for the performance of the completed work. A buyer should be aware of the project professional distinctions when developing the project plan.

These prefabricated structures are widely used in the residential as well as industrial sector for its unmatched characteristics.

== Evolving design features and functional flexibility ==
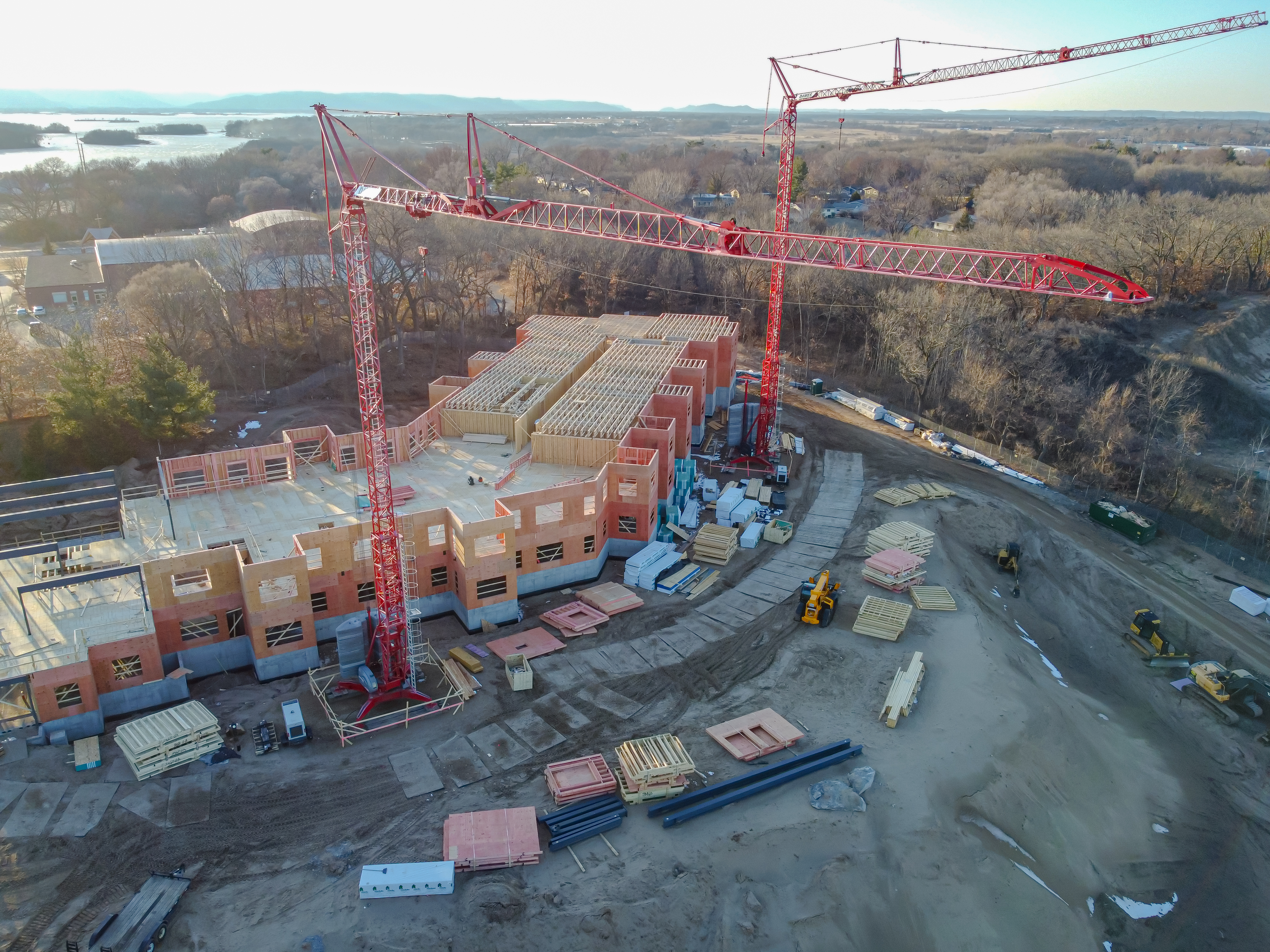
Prefabricated framing walls at a construction site with tower cranes

Recent advancements in pre-engineered building systems have led to the integration of diverse structural sub-systems and accessories, enhancing both functionality and aesthetic appeal. These structures now commonly include mezzanine floors for optimised interior space, crane runway beams for industrial applications, and specialised roof platforms or catwalks for operational efficiency. Aesthetic components such as fascias, parapets, and customised canopies contribute to modern design flexibility, catering to varied architectural requirements. Furthermore, pre-engineered buildings have gained recognition for their superior cost-effectiveness and speed of construction compared to traditional methods, making them a preferred choice for both commercial and industrial projects worldwide.

== See also ==
- Kit house
- MAN steel house
- Modular building
- Prefabricated home
- Prefabrication
- Containerized housing unit
- Large panel system building
- Panel buildings
- Panel buildings in Russia
- Panelák
- Panelház
- Million Programme
- Tin tabernacle
