= William Eassie =

William Eassie (1805-1861) was a Scottish businessman of the mid 19th century, working as a railway contractor and then as a Gloucester-based supplier of prefabricated wooden buildings.

== Career ==
Eassie was born at Lochee near Dundee in 1805. Little is known of his early life, but he was involved in construction of the East Lancashire Railway in 1840.

In 1849 he moved to Gloucestershire and worked on the Gloucester and Dean Forest Railway, securing a contract to supply and install wooden sleepers and to lay iron rails. He subsequently worked on the docks branch of this railway on the west side of the Gloucester and Sharpness Canal, and on the Vale of Neath Railway in south Wales.

Eassie established a factory in Gloucester in 1849, and became one of the city's major employers, employing over 1,000 men, working in shifts.

In delivering contracts, Eassie worked often with Richard Potter of Price & Co, a Gloucester-based timber importer, and in 1851 he set up a steam-powered saw mill on land beside the Gloucester and Sharpness Canal that Price & Co leased from Gloucester Corporation. From this mill, Eassie also supplied other contractors, including those working on rail projects for Isambard Kingdom Brunel.

Eassie's work diversified from rail projects into supply of wood for buildings, including greenhouses for a Royal Agricultural Society show in Gloucester in July 1853, and doors, windows and complete buildings for export to Australia to house gold prospectors. This experience in prefabricated buildings led to an 1854 commission to supply huts to house British troops engaged in the Crimean War, followed by a similar order from the French government. Shortly after completion of these orders in early 1855, Eassie was approached by Brunel to work on designs for prefabricated buildings to form the Renkioi military hospital near the Dardanelles. The hospital was designed as 16 buildings, each holding 50 patients in two wards, and were shipped direct from Gloucester Docks to Balaklava.

After the Crimean War, Eassie's business expanded its engineering capabilities, forging scrap iron to manufacture ship anchors and other components, and developing a piling machine to work at the Millwall Iron Works in London where Brunel's SS Great Eastern was being built.

However, Eassie's business got into financial difficulties, and he was forced to restructure the business, giving his sons (William and Peter Boyd Eassie) formal roles in William Eassie & Sons. The company continued to make wooden buildings for UK and overseas customers, later expanding into the supply of wood for the manufacture of railway wagons in an adjacent works in Gloucester.

== Legacy ==
Eassie died in May 1861, but the company was continued by his sons, becoming a limited company in 1868. In 1875, Eassie & Co was acquired by its neighbour, the Gloucester Railway Carriage and Wagon Company, and in 1900 became the Gloucester Joinery Co. Ltd, making shop fronts, shop fittings, staircases, greenhouses and church and school furniture until the mid 1940s.

William Eassie Jr became a prominent civil engineer engaged on public health projects, and an advocate of cremation, writing a book Cremation: Its History and Bearings upon Public Health (published in 1875) and serving as honorary secretary of the Cremation Society.
