= MAN steel house =

German pre-fabricated building

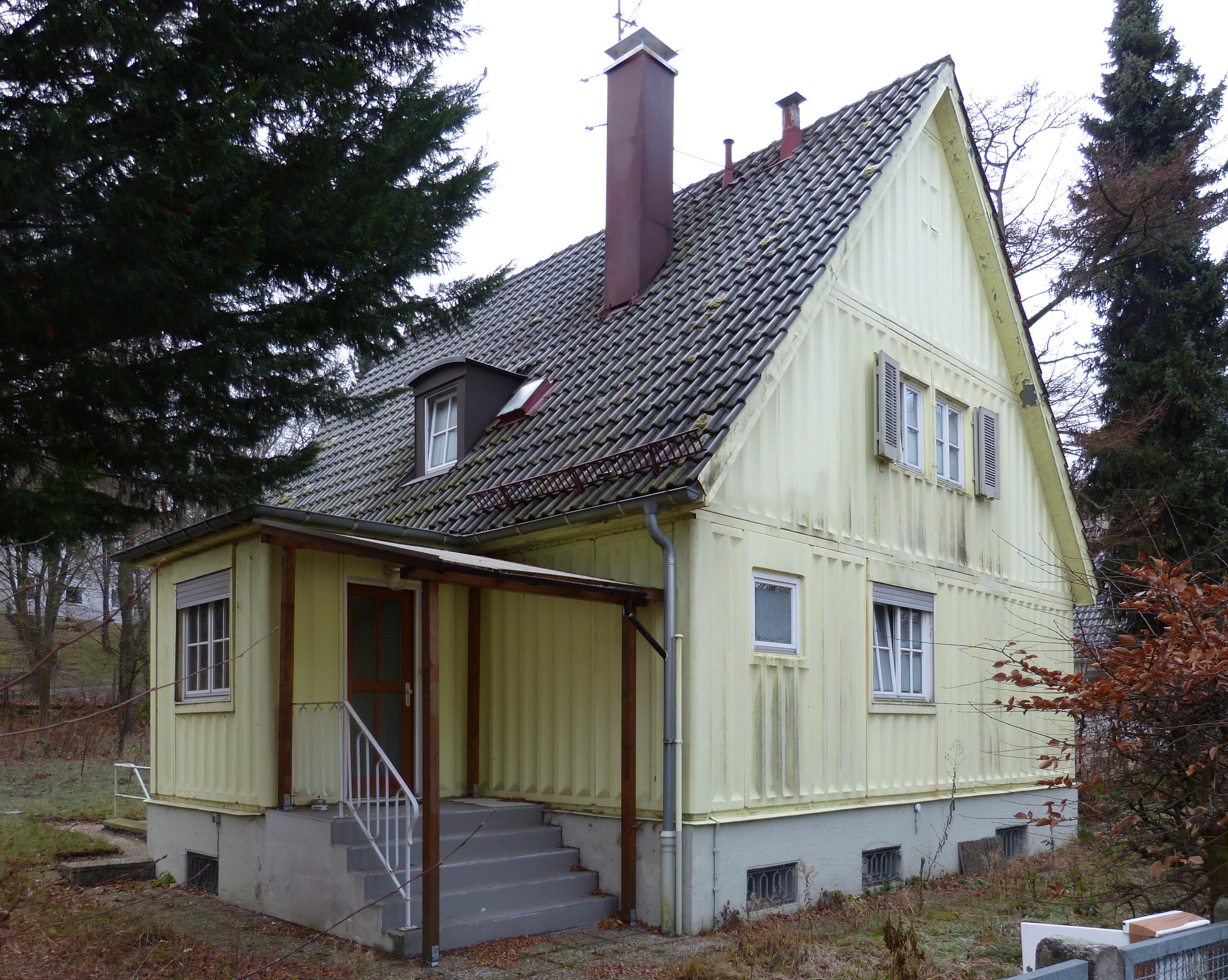
MAN steel house in Augsburg, Sebastianstrasse 29

The MAN steel house was a pre-fabricated building by MAN (Machine Works Augsburg-Nürnberg). A total of 230 units were built worldwide from 1948 to 1953.

== History ==
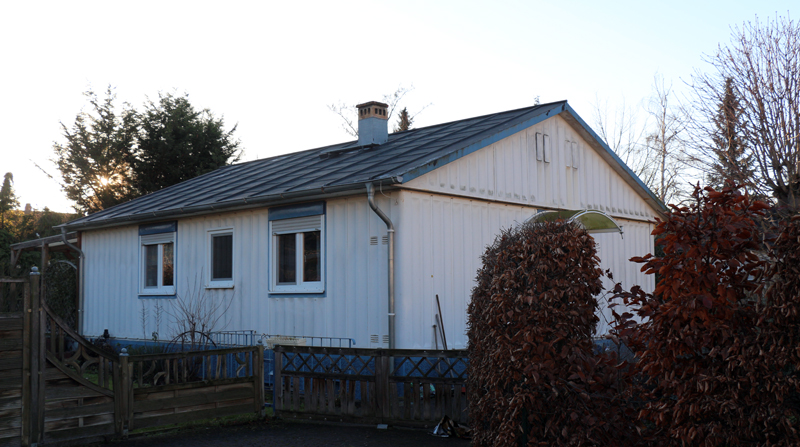
Gustavsburg, Robert-Koch-Strasse 23

The MAN factory in Ginsheim-Gustavsburg, looking for new non-military markets after World War II built from 1948 prefabricated steel houses, based on a concept from the 1920s. The concept was developed in the headquarters in Augsburg based on an idea of the engineer Heinz Bauer and was commercially produced in Mainz-Gustavsburg.

MAN built a sample estate, which once housed the senior staff, close to the Cramer-Klett-settlement of Gustavsburg, which had been built in the style of a garden city in the first quarter of the 20th century. Two different models were presented there, to export them on a large scale worldwide. The model home complex showed the basic type with a base of 8 by 8 metres (26 ft × 26 ft). Production was however discontinued after production of 230 houses in 1953.

== Design ==
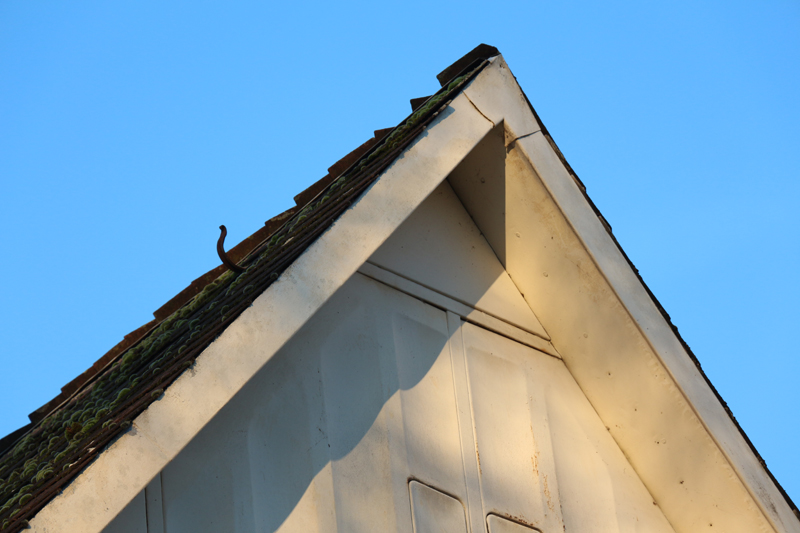
Detail of the gable

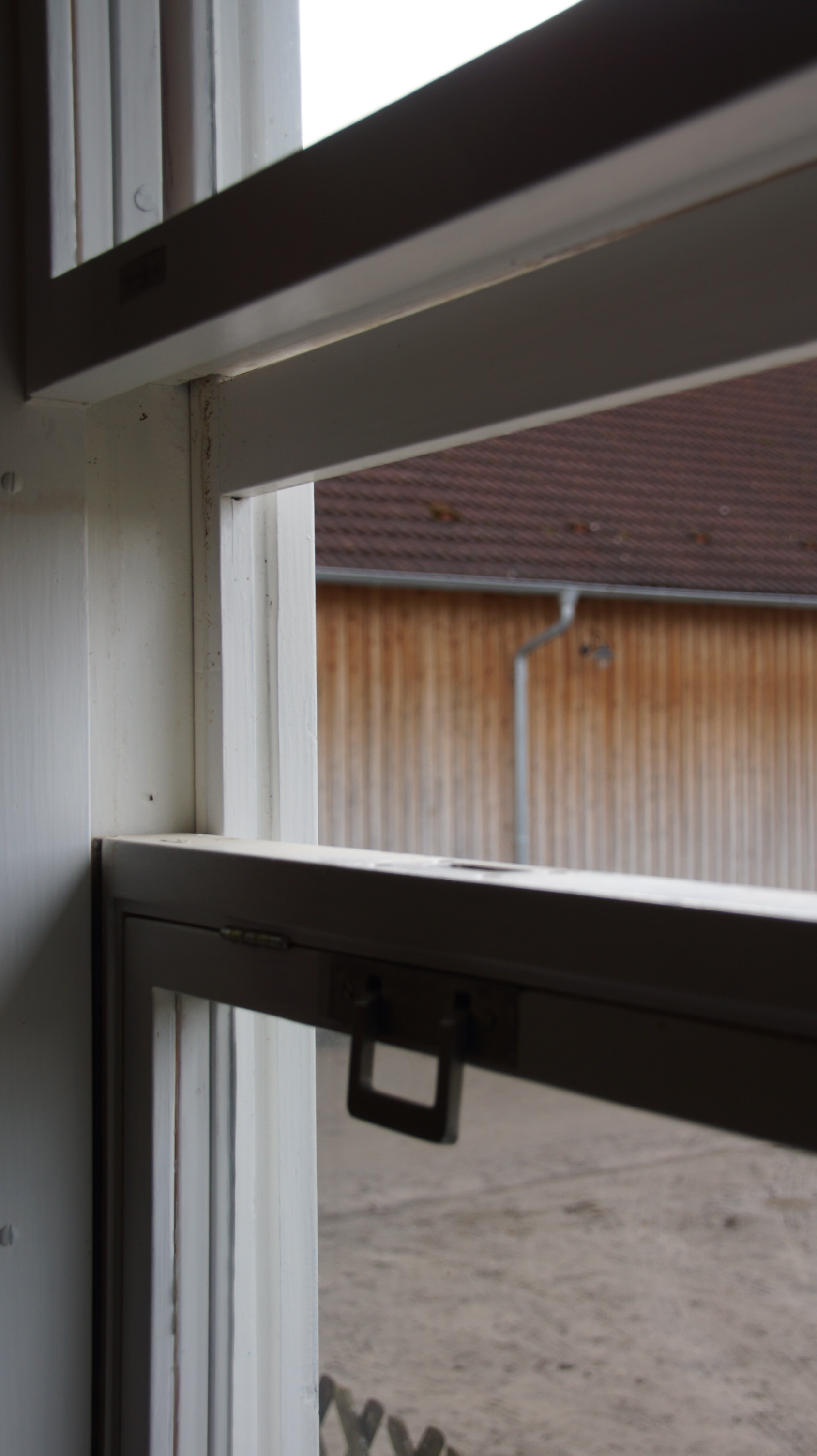
Window in Bad Windsheim

The wall elements were pre-fabricated at the MAN factory and then bolted to a steel frame construction which was erected on-site on top of a brick foundation and a thermal insulation layer of fiberglass mats was located between the outer steel sheets and hardboard inside, with an insulation value similar to that of an 80-centimetre (31 in) thick brick wall according to historic advertising brochures. The outside of the steel walls were painted with a solvent-based lacquer as a means of corrosion protection.

The architectural design resembled conventional stone buildings: The perforated facade with a gable roof and mullioned windows with shutters were "quite plain, but cosy and with all objectivity something for the German mind" as required in the specification by the architect Hans Schneider on behalf of MAN in 1949. The basic type could be ordered according to the catalogue with different roof pitches. The inner walls could be built individually, since the roof was supported by the outer walls. The version with the steeper roof provided space for a habitable attic.

There were four different floor plans: 8 by 8 metres (26 ft × 26 ft), 8 by 10 metres (26 ft × 33 ft), 8 by 13 metres (26 ft × 43 ft), and 8 by 16 metres (26 ft × 52 ft). The individual modules of the steel houses were assembled on site. The rectangular outer wall panels were made of 1-millimetre (0.039 in) thick steel plate with a size of 1 by 2.51 metres (3.3 ft × 8.2 ft) and were placed next to each other. The interior walls were made of hardboard or plywood panels, which were insulated by glass wool mats from the outer steel sheets. The roof structure was formed from standardized trusses 8 metres (26 ft) in length. The floor was well insulated with glass wool mats and consisted of tongue and groove planks that were mounted on the modular steel frame construction.

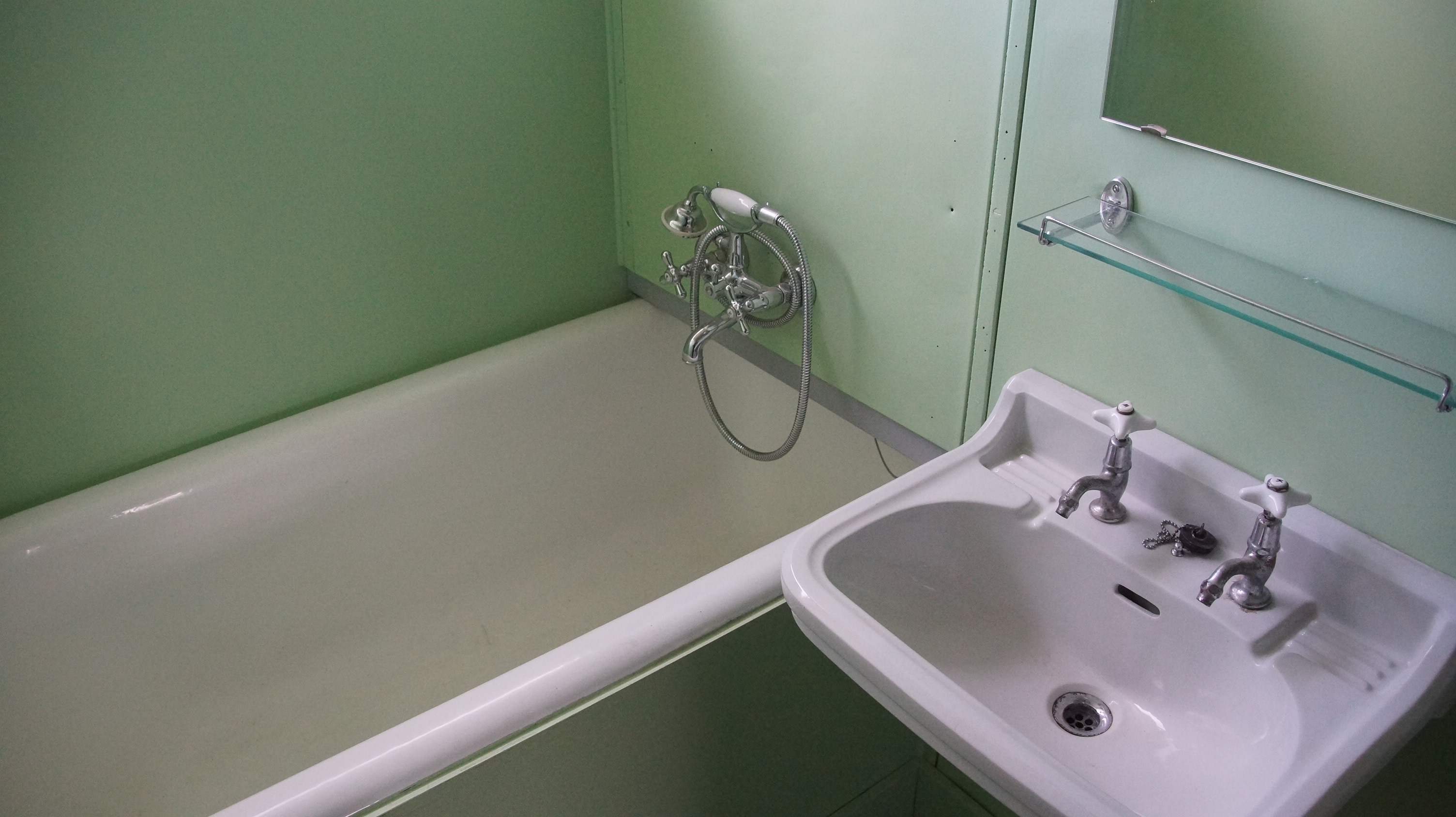
Bathroom in Bad Windsheim

The windows were provided with counterweights and retractable fly screens and could be lowered down into the wall opening as in a railway carriage. A factory built steel wall, which included the water and waste water pipes, was installed between the kitchen and bathroom with the particularity that the bathtub of the narrow bathroom protruded through the wall to save space in the cabinet of the sink. Closets were used to build the remaining interior walls. The quality of the MAN steel houses proved to be excellent in comparison to the competition of that time. Due to the good thermal insulation, the hot-dip galvanized components and the heat treated paints, there were very little corrosion and condensation problems.

== Cost ==
A home with simple equipment then cost 18,800 DM, which was relatively expensive compared to other prefabricated houses that have already been offered from 3,500 DM. Including special fittings such as kitchen, bathroom equipment and hot water central heating a MAN steel houses cost 30,000 DM, which today would correspond to about 70,000 Euros.

== Remaining buildings ==
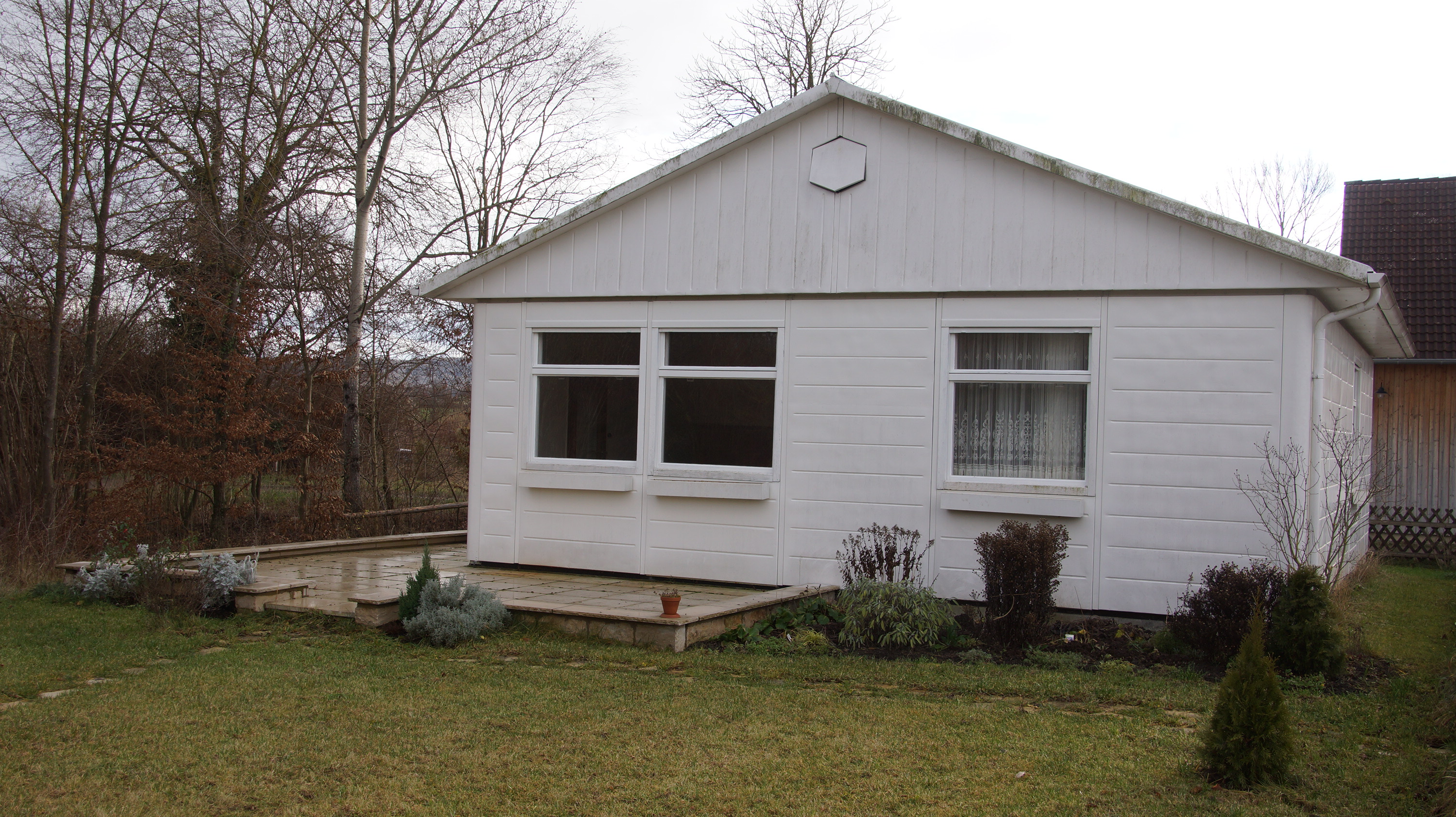
MAN steel house in the Franconian Open Air Museum in Bad Windsheim

In Germany, about 40 MAN steel houses remain, whose outer walls need to be occasionally sandblasted because of corrosion and repainted.

In Ginsheim-Gustavsburg is an historically significant ensemble with ten listed, still inhabited MAN steel houses, including two semi-detached houses on Robert-Koch-Straße 17, 19, 21 and 23, Nürnberger Straße 20 and 22, as well as Müngstener Straße 4, 6, 8 and 10. The two smallest have a floor area of 64 square metres (690 sq ft) each, the others are bigger. All may, according to a concept of heritage authority in accordance with the Hessian Monument Protection Act, be provided with modern extensions. The historical architecture and contemporary architecture have to be made visible in contrast to each other. The ten houses are part of the Industrial Culture Route Rhein-Main Mainspitze .

Four houses are preserved in Augsburg-Oberhausen in Sebastianstrasse 29d, e, f and i close to the MAN factory site. Another MAN steel house is located in Bergen-Leitershofen, on Bergstraße 9. A MAN steel house from 1948 was translocated in 2011 from the Wendelstein-Nerreth near Nuremberg to the Franconian Open Air Museum of Bad Windsheim.

In Düsseldorf-Rath, two MAN steel houses from 1951 and 1952 still exist on Eitelstraße 68 and Reichswaldallee 31. Another one is still in Düsseldorf-Kaiserwerth.

In the Mainz upper town were originally four MAN steel houses, of which three remain at Goldgrube 33, 35 and 43 (as of 2013). A MAN Steel house with a low roof remains in Cologne-Muengersdorf, on Liebermannstraße 12. Another house is located in Oppenheim, on Friedrich-Ebert-Straße 75.

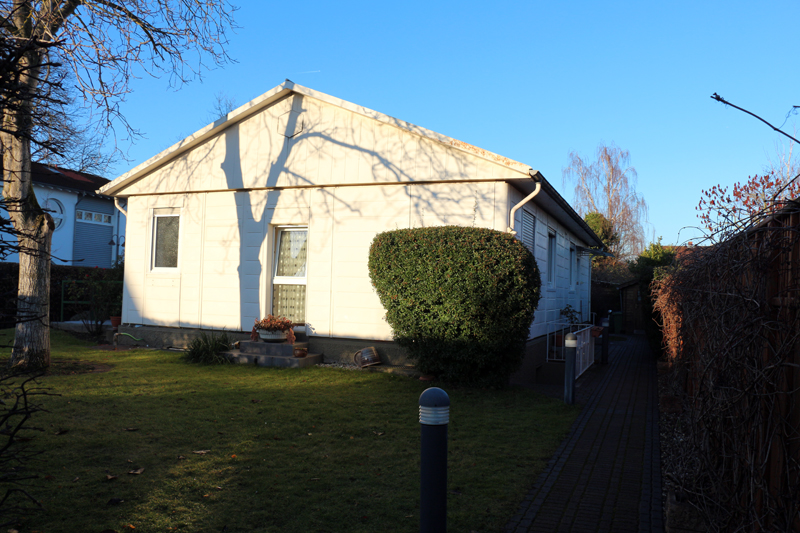
Gustavsburg, Müngstener Straße 4

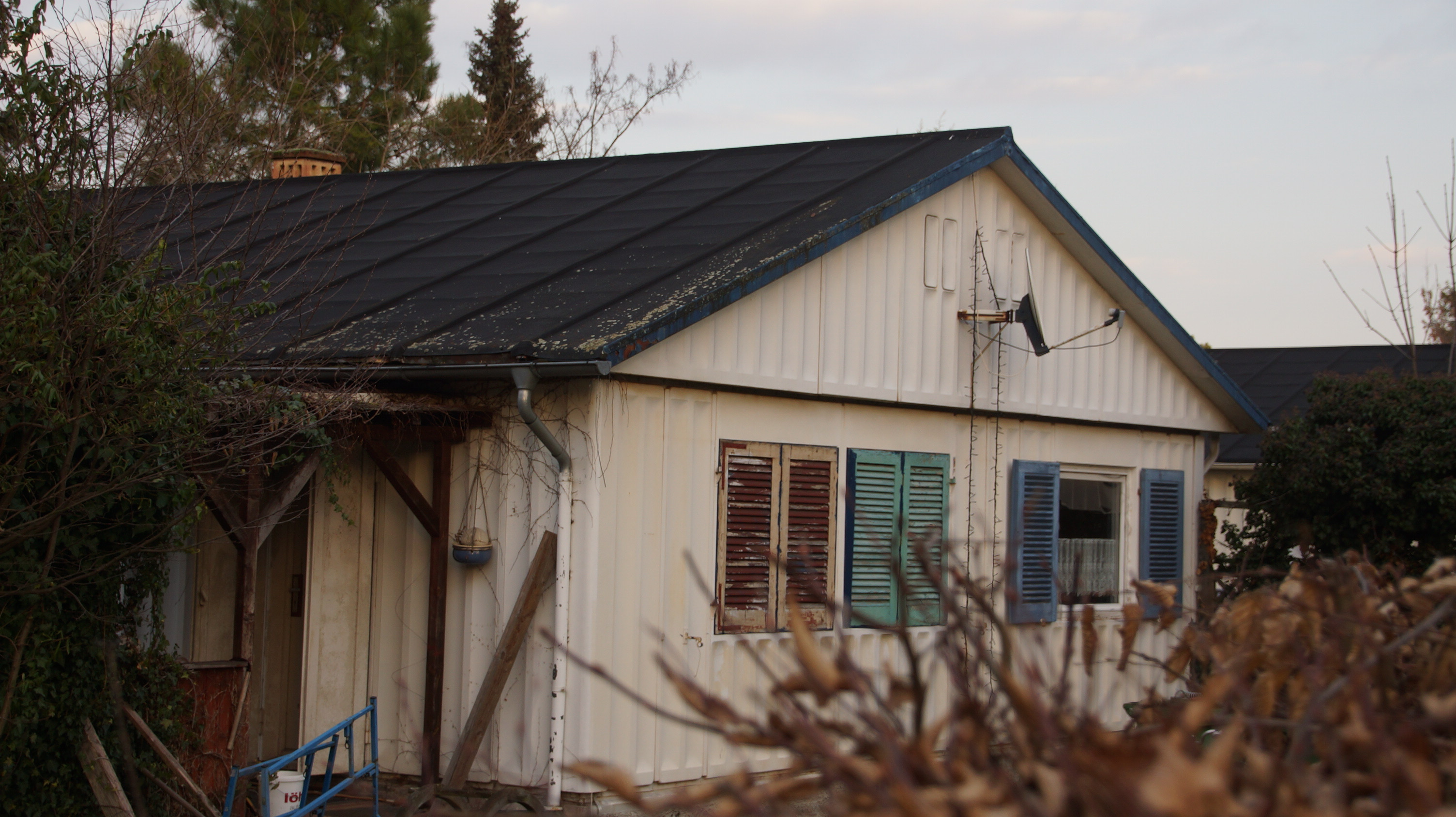
Gustavsburg, Müngstener Straße 6

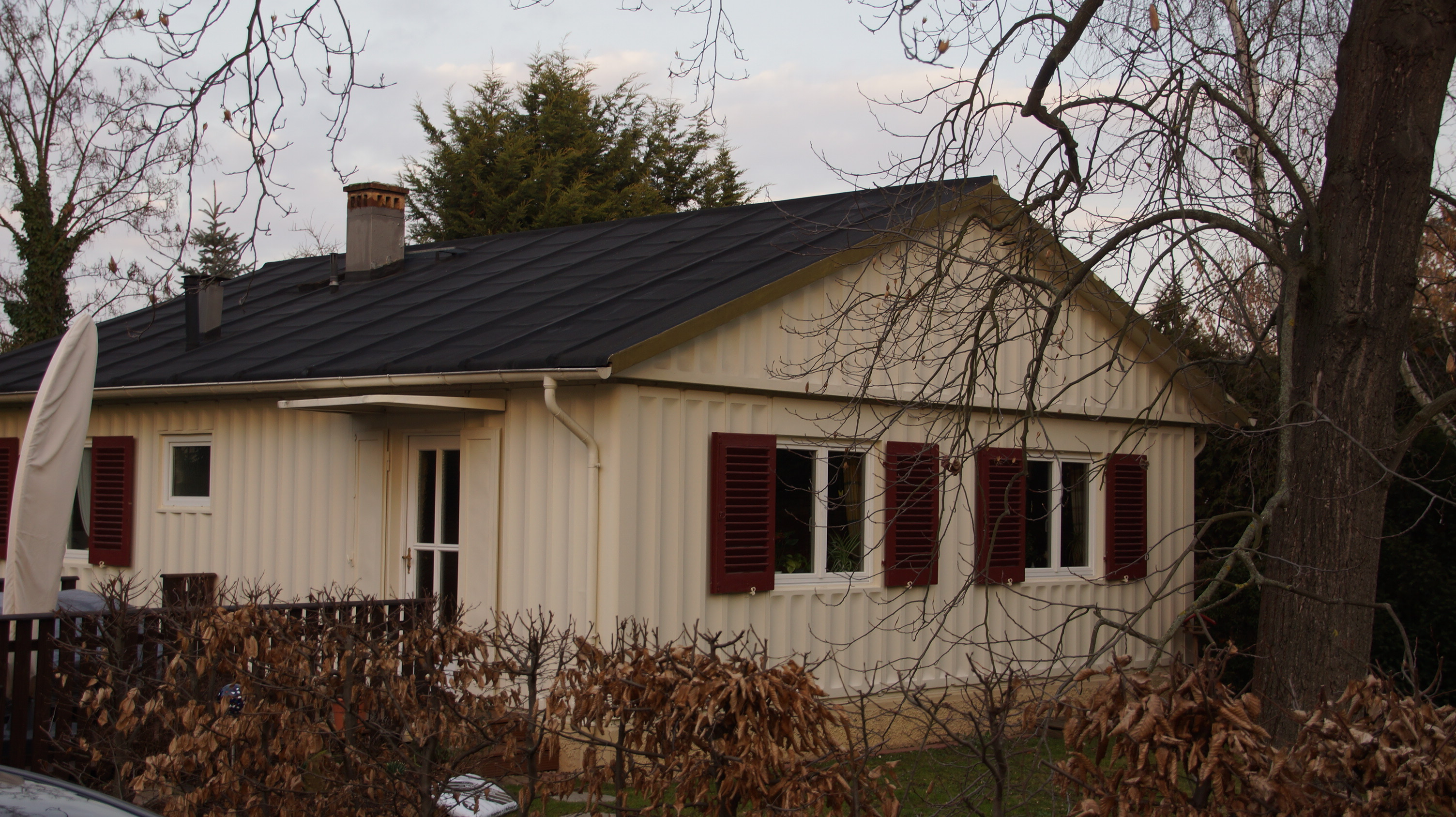
Gustavsburg, Müngstener Straße 8

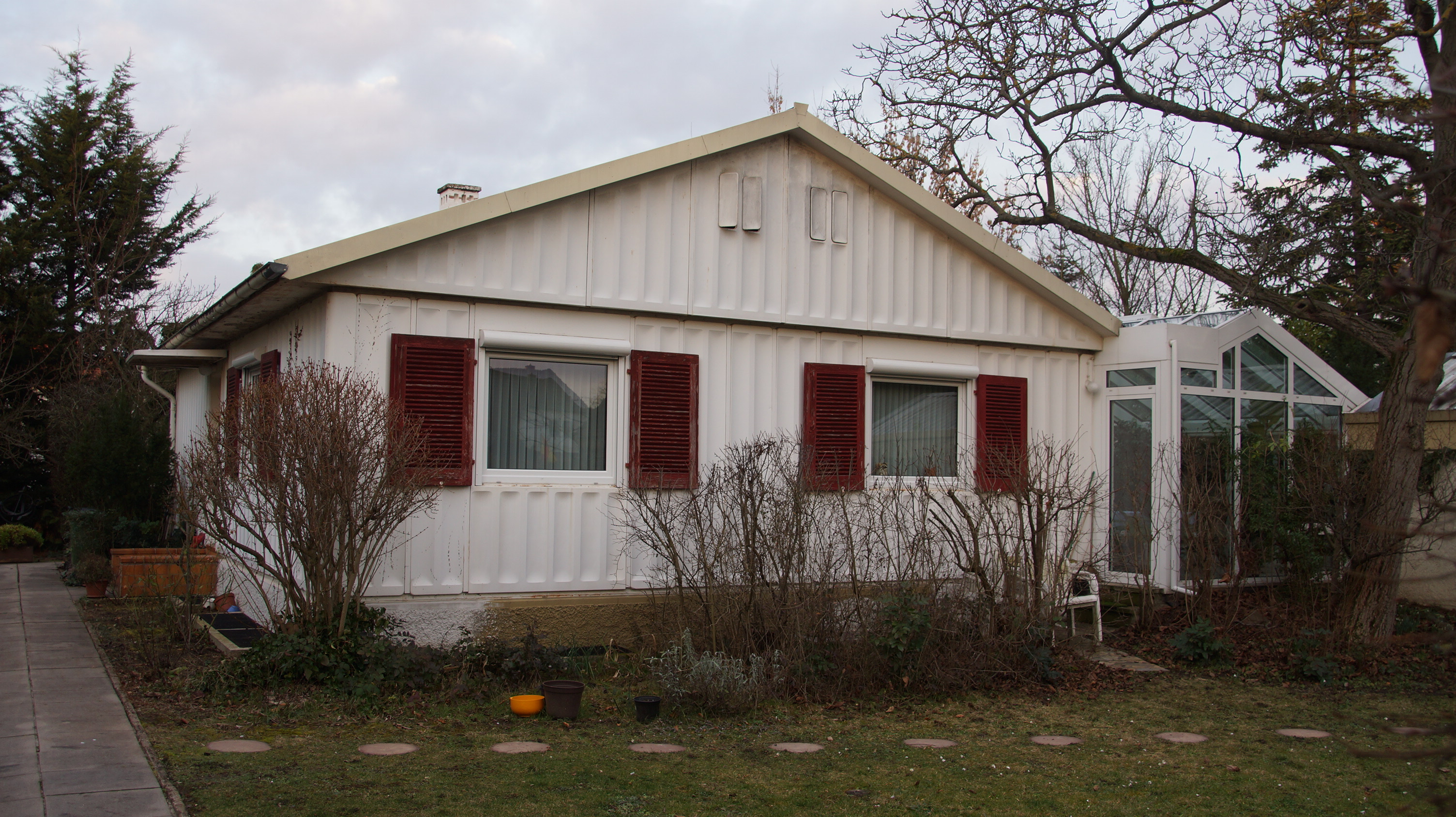
Gustavsburg, Müngstener Straße 10

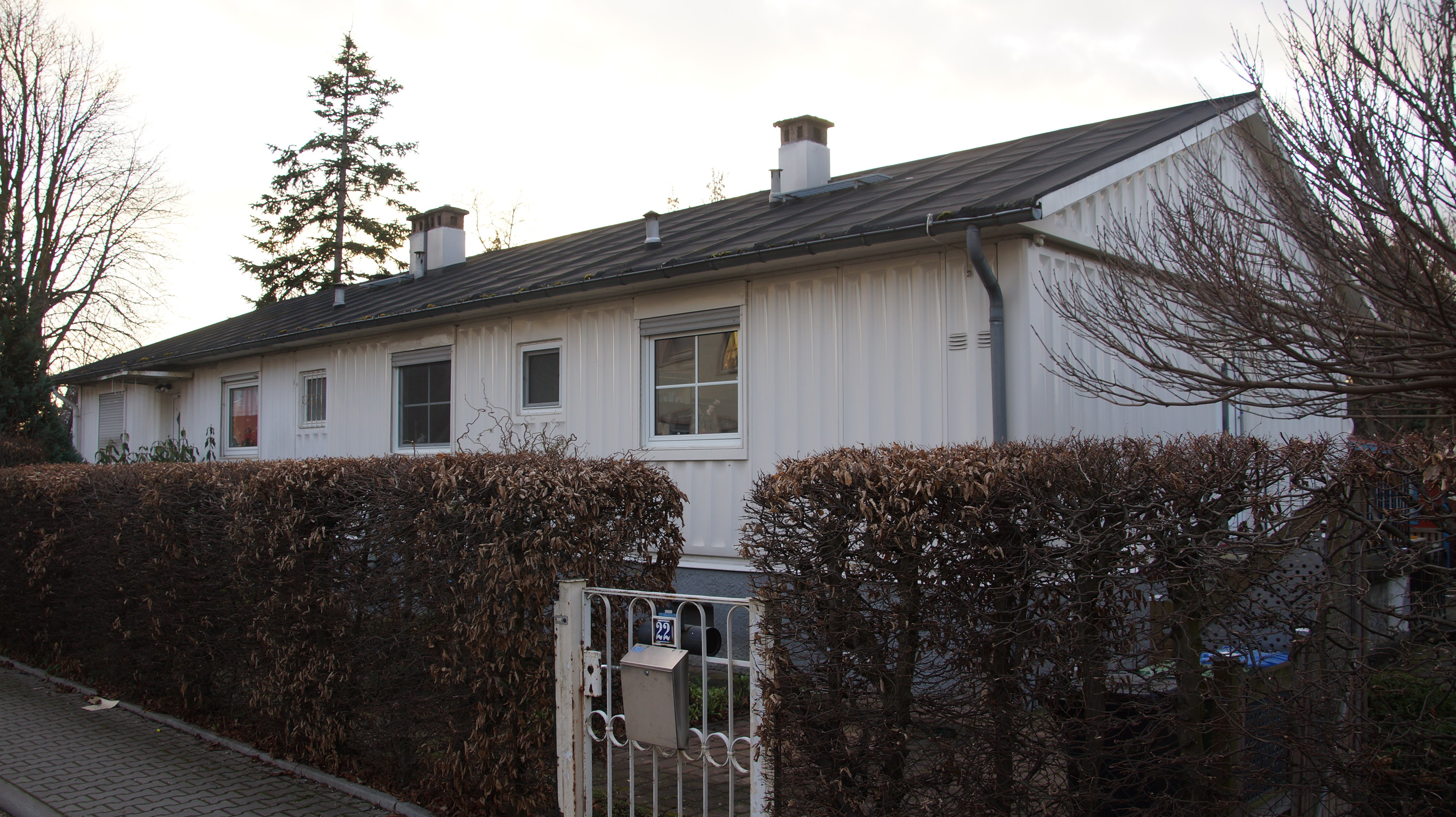
Gustavsburg, Nürnberger Straße 20 and 22 (semidetached houses)

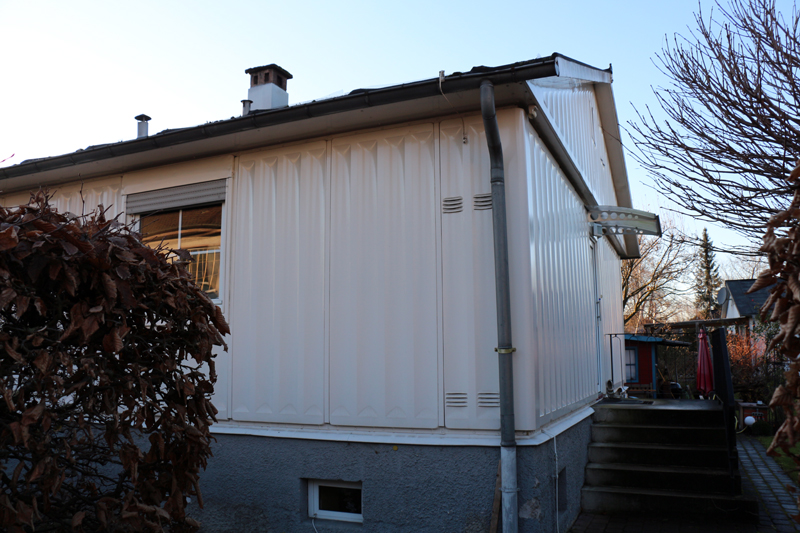
Gustavsburg, Nürnberger Straße 22 (semidetached house)

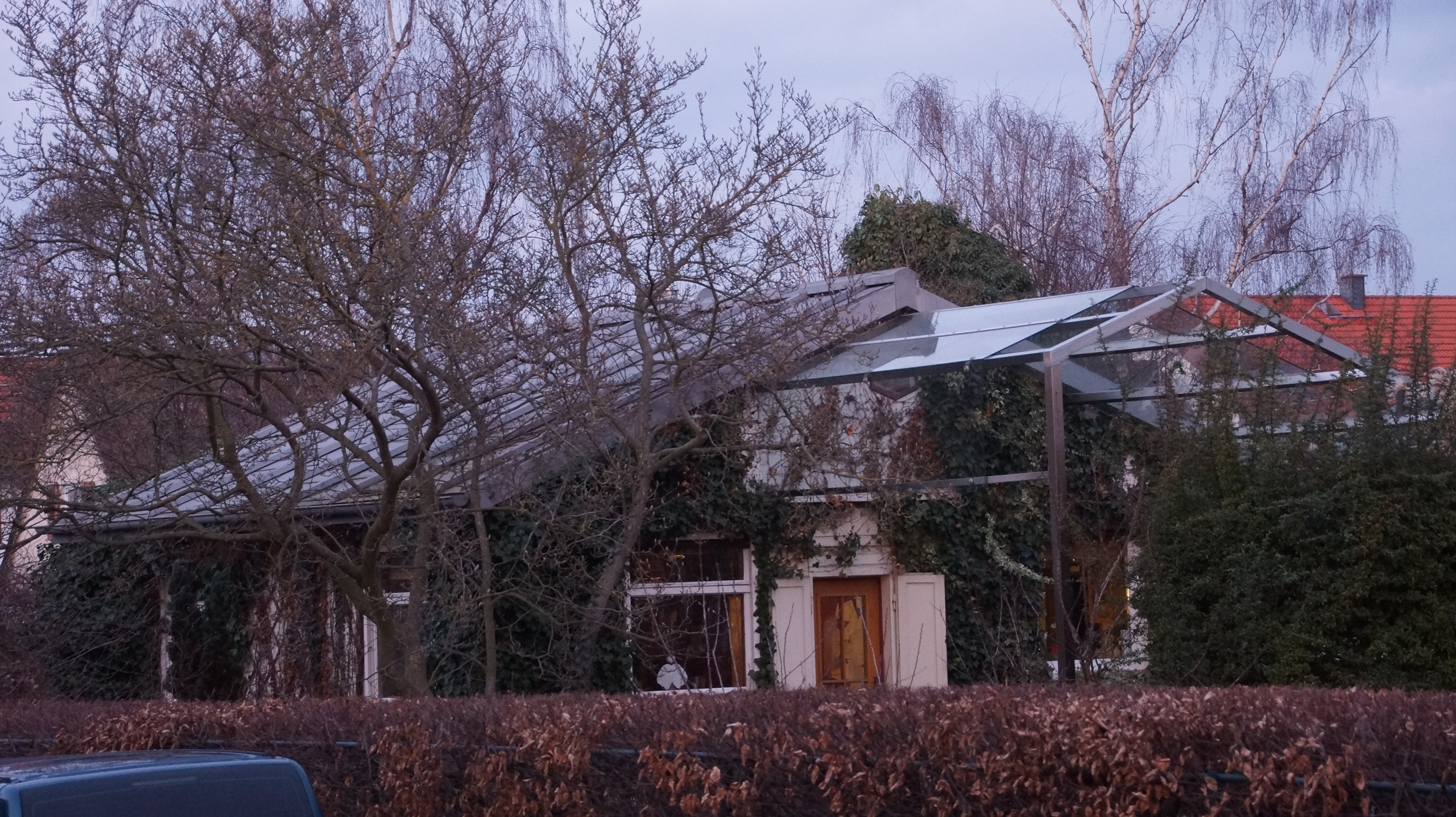
Gustavsburg, Robert-Koch-Straße 17

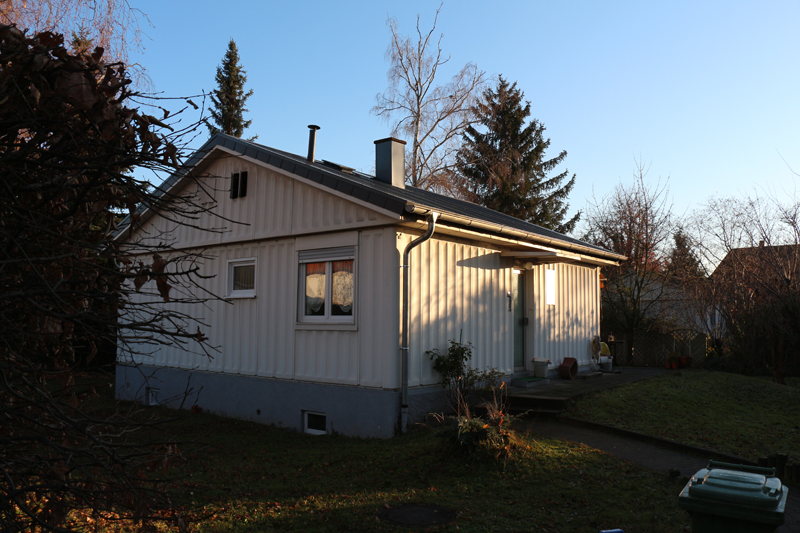
Gustavsburg, Robert-Koch-Straße 19

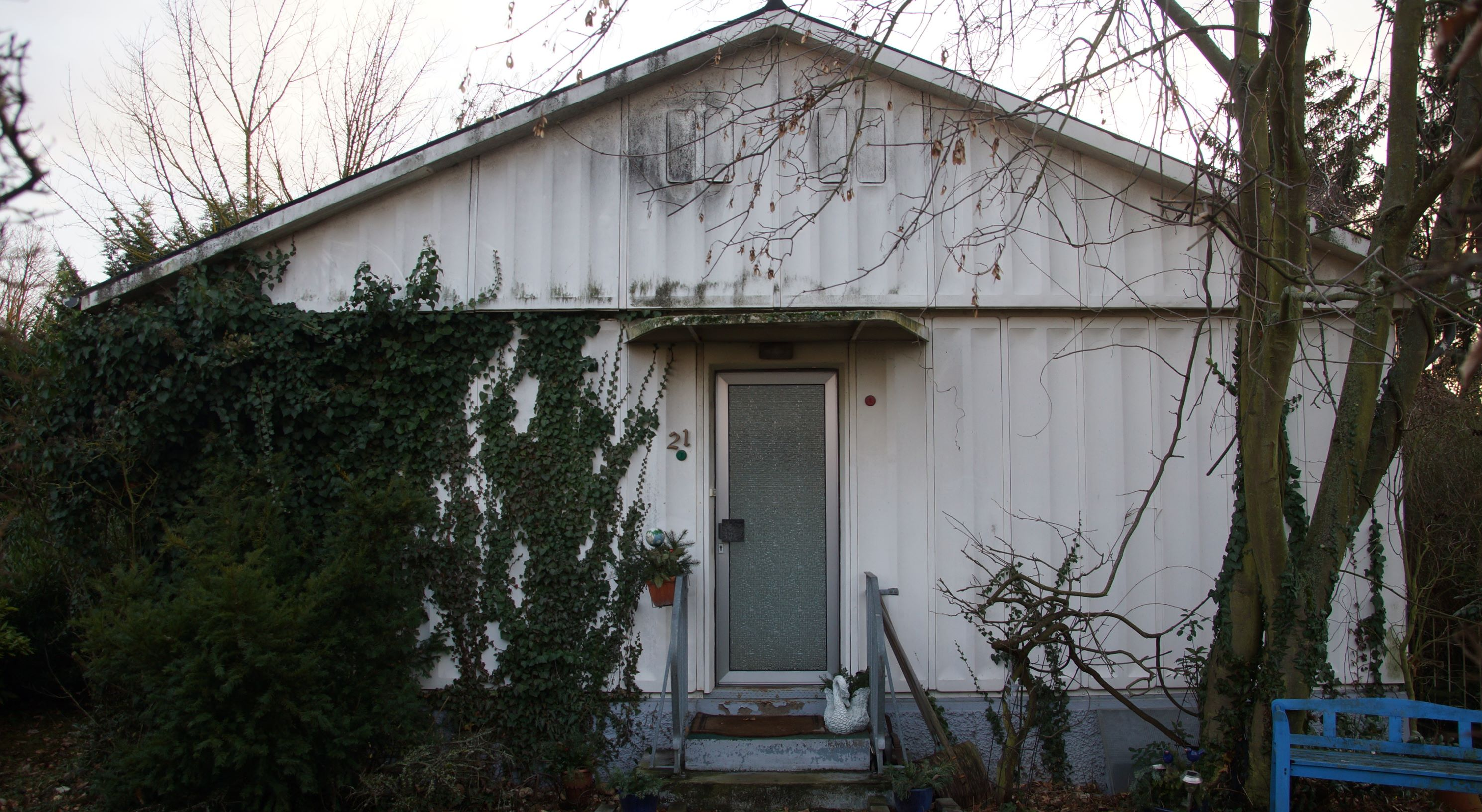
Gustavsburg, Robert-Koch-Straße 21

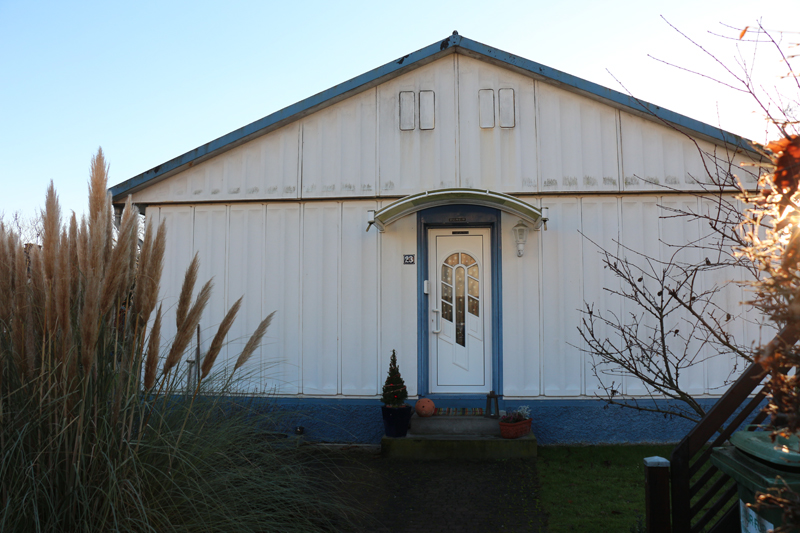
Gustavsburg, Robert-Koch-Straße 23

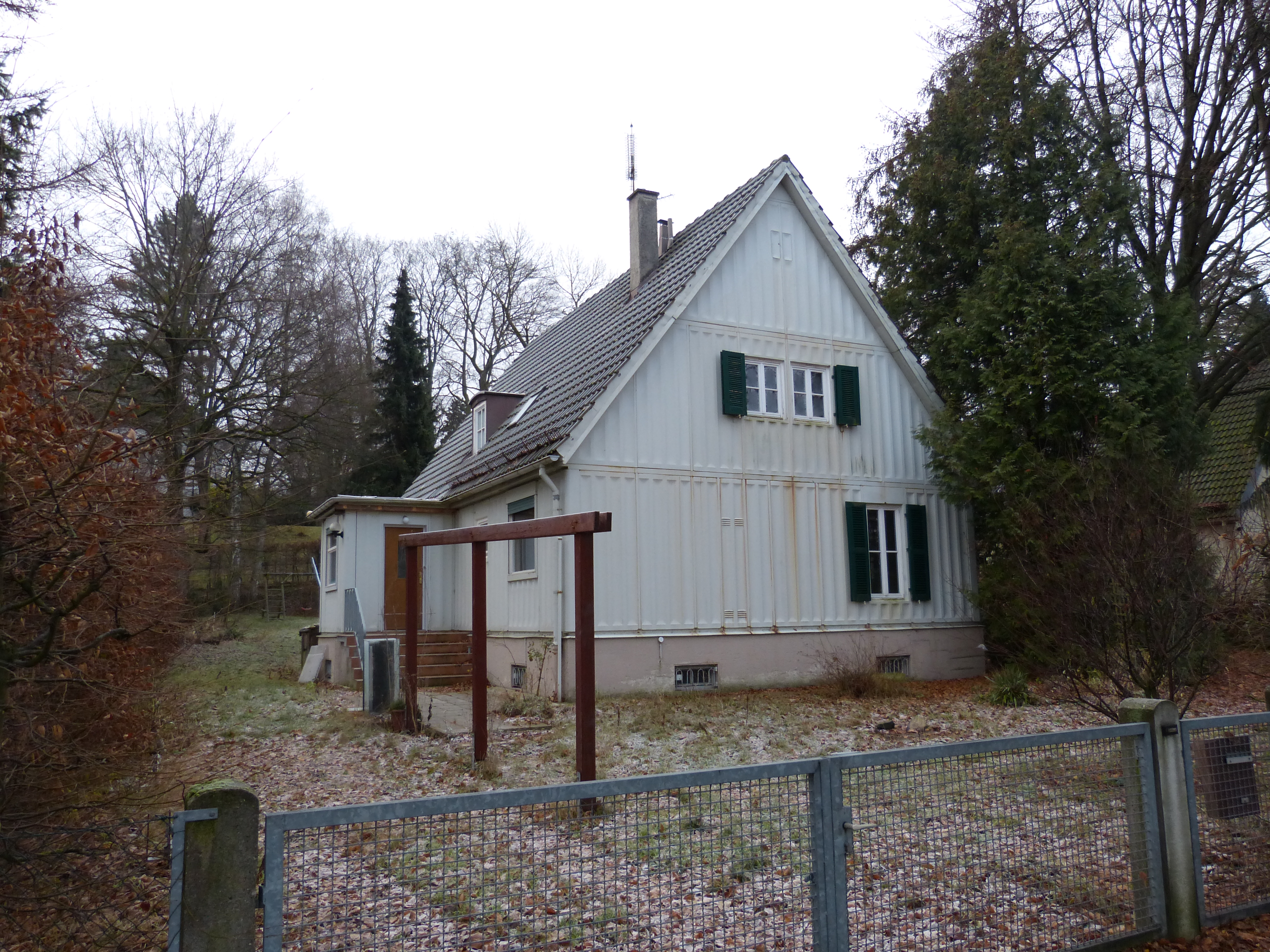
Augsburg, Sebastianstraße 29 e

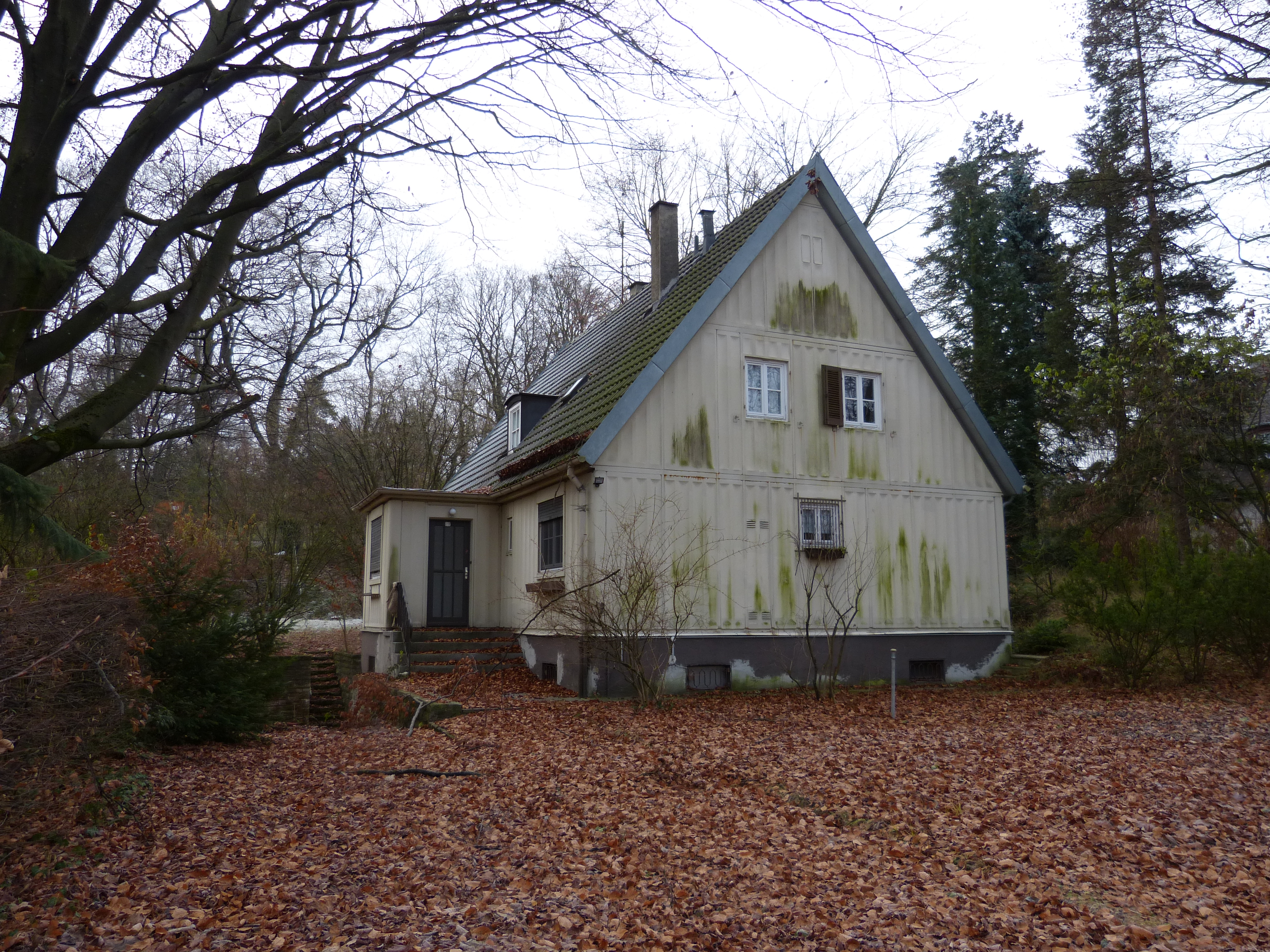
Augsburg, Sebastianstraße 29 f

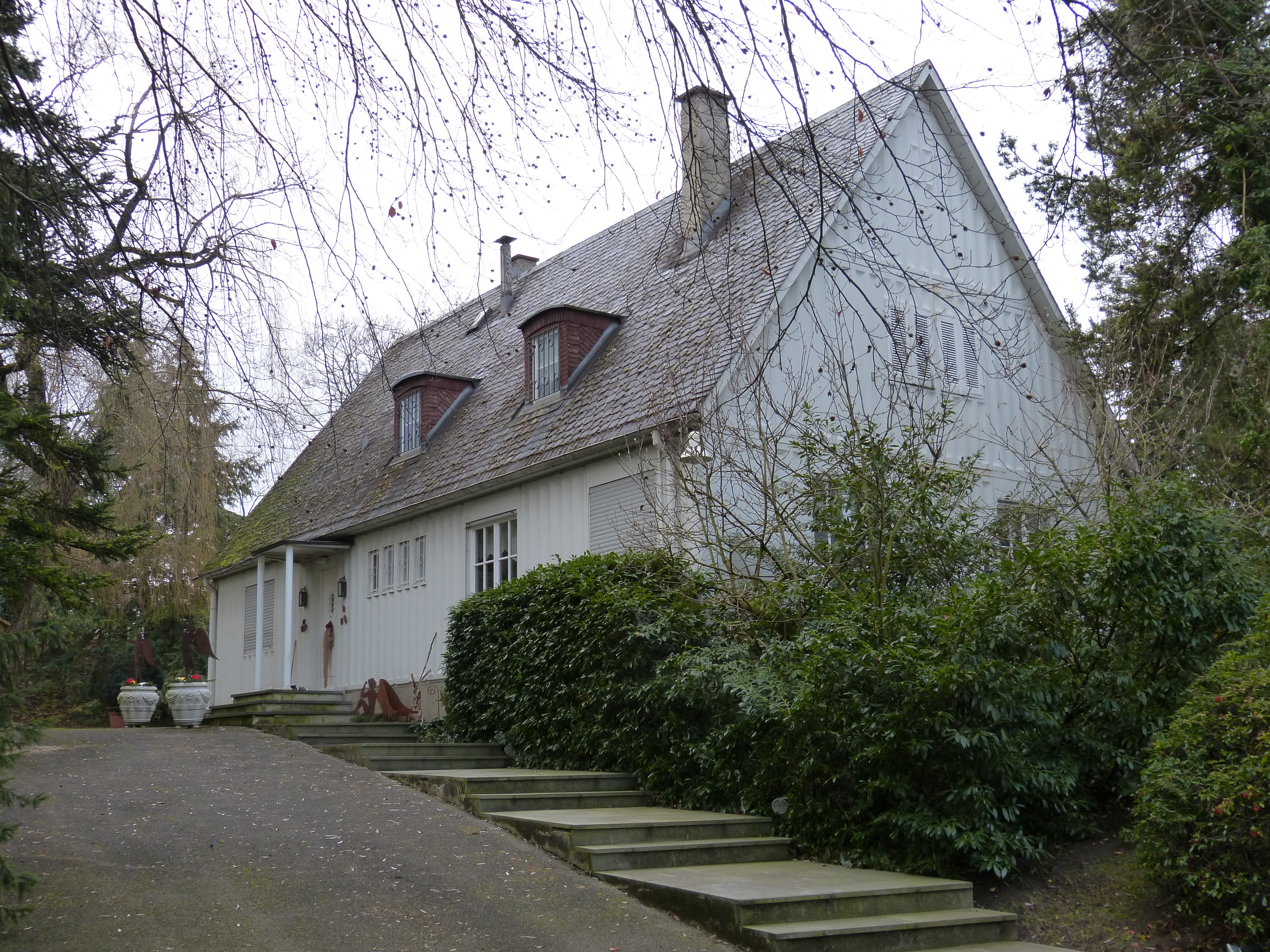
Augsburg, Sebastianstraße 29 i

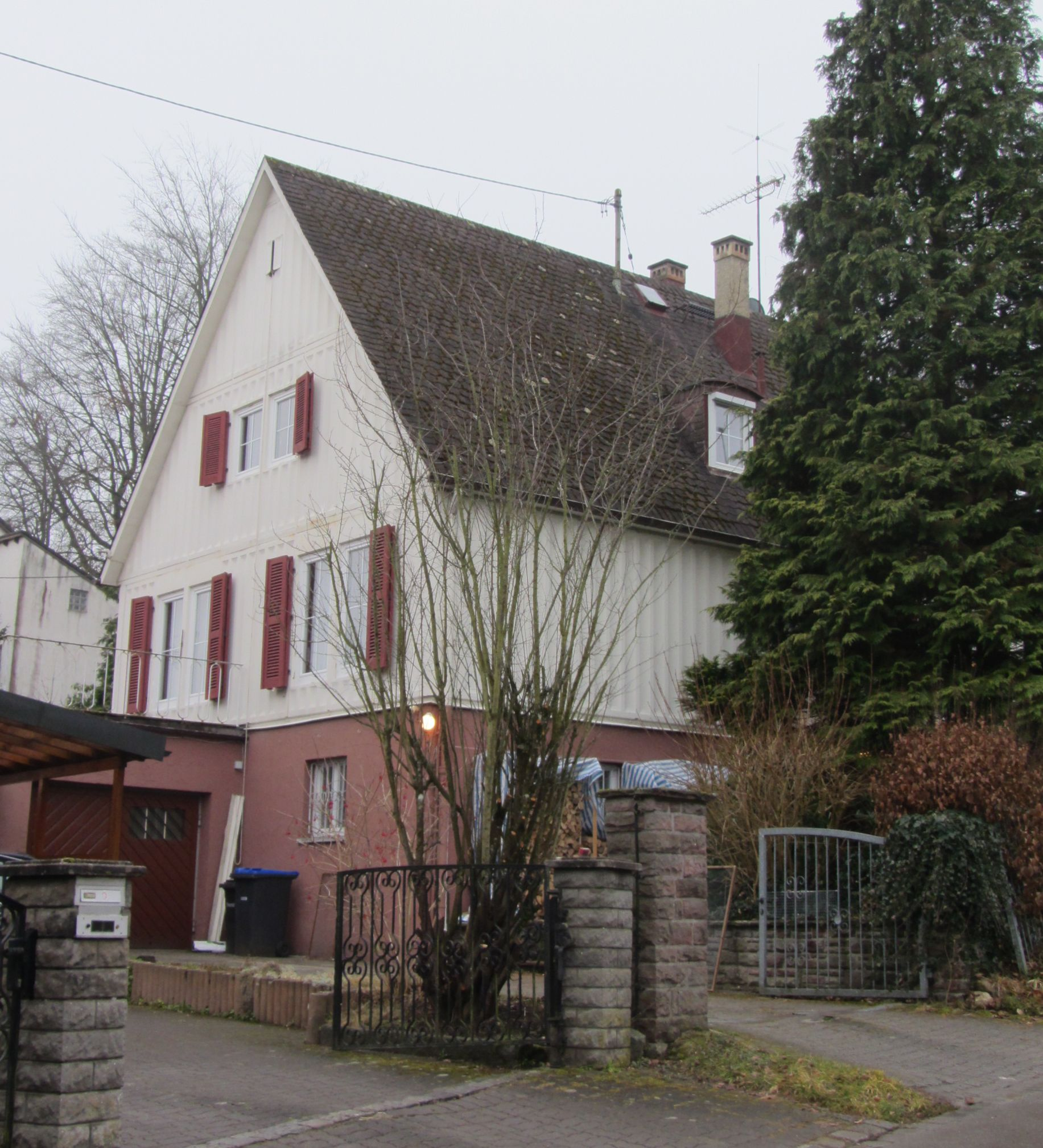
Stadtbergen-Leitershofen, Bergstraße 9

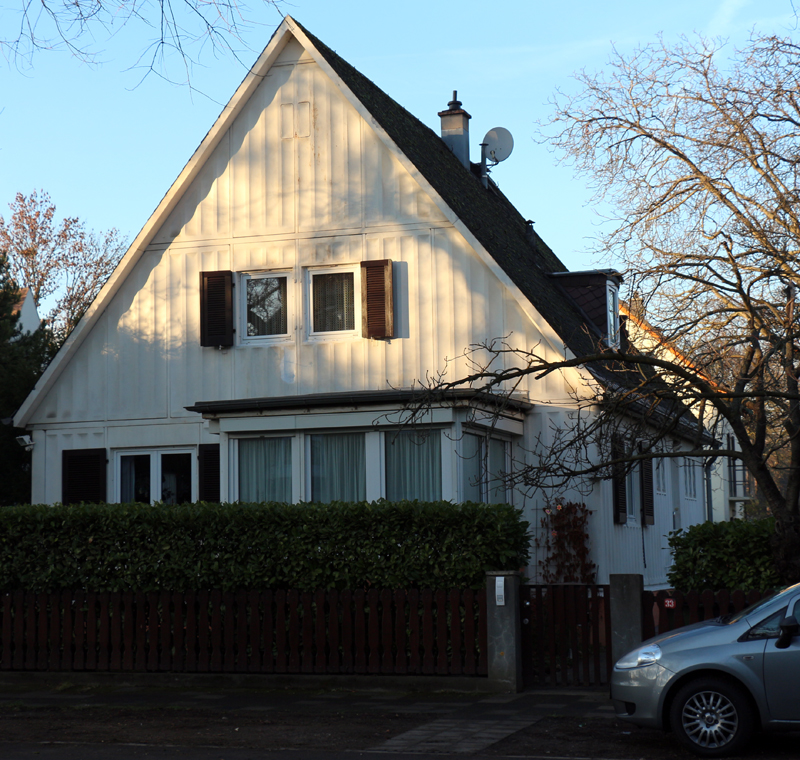
Mainz, An der Goldgrube 33

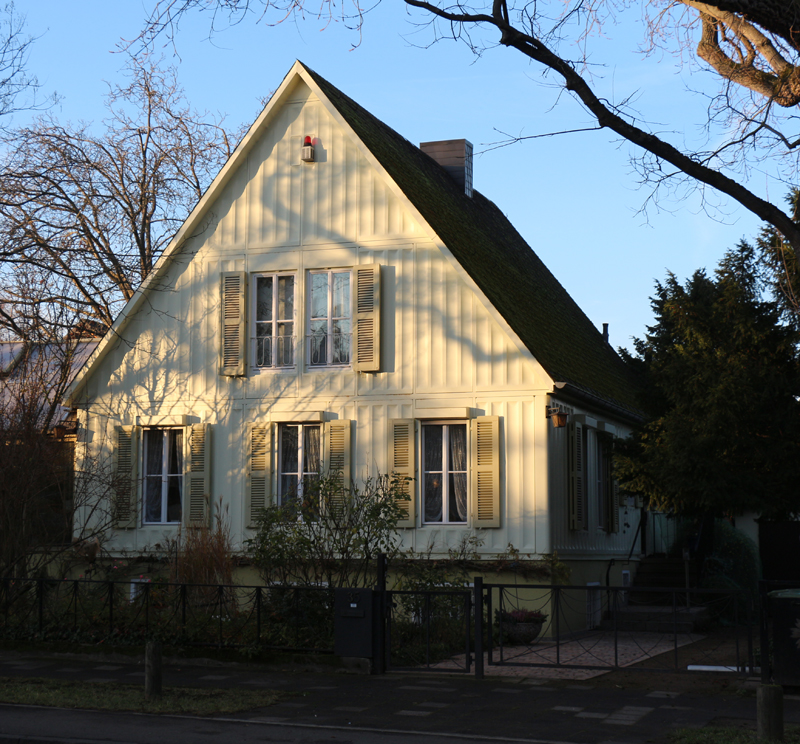
Mainz, An der Goldgrube 35

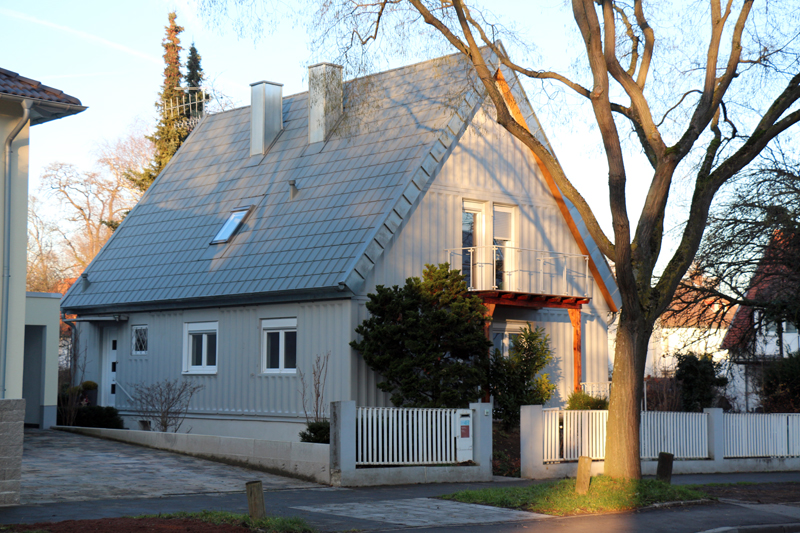
Mainz, An der Goldgrube 43

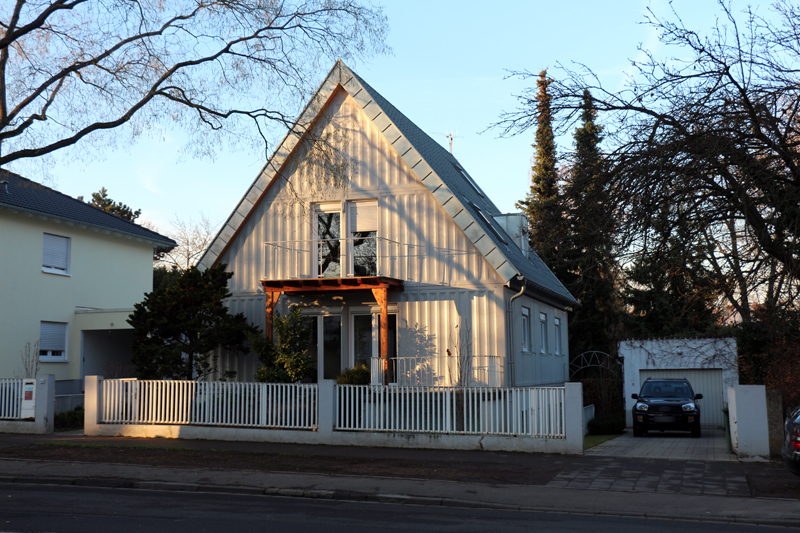
Mainz, An der Goldgrube 43

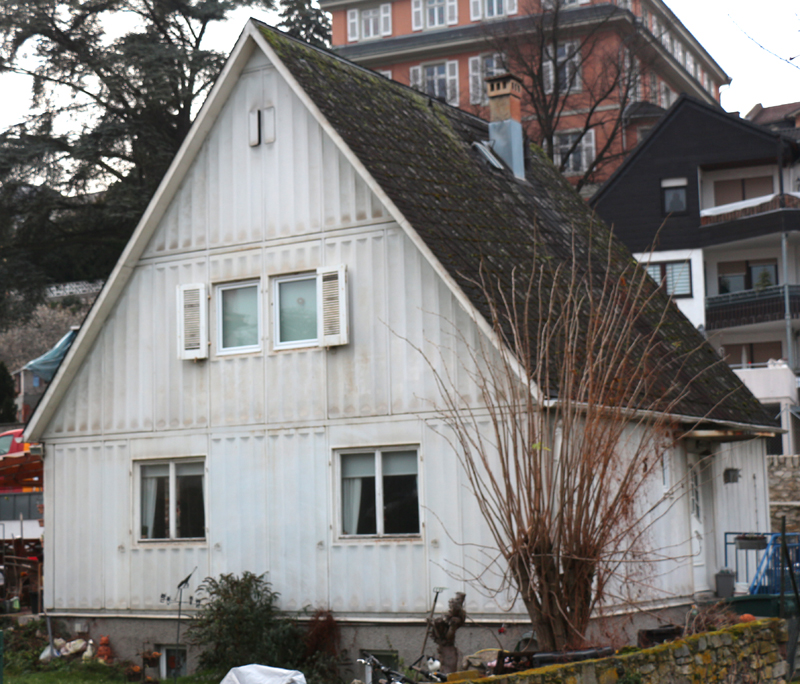
Oppenheim, Friedrich-Ebert-Straße 75

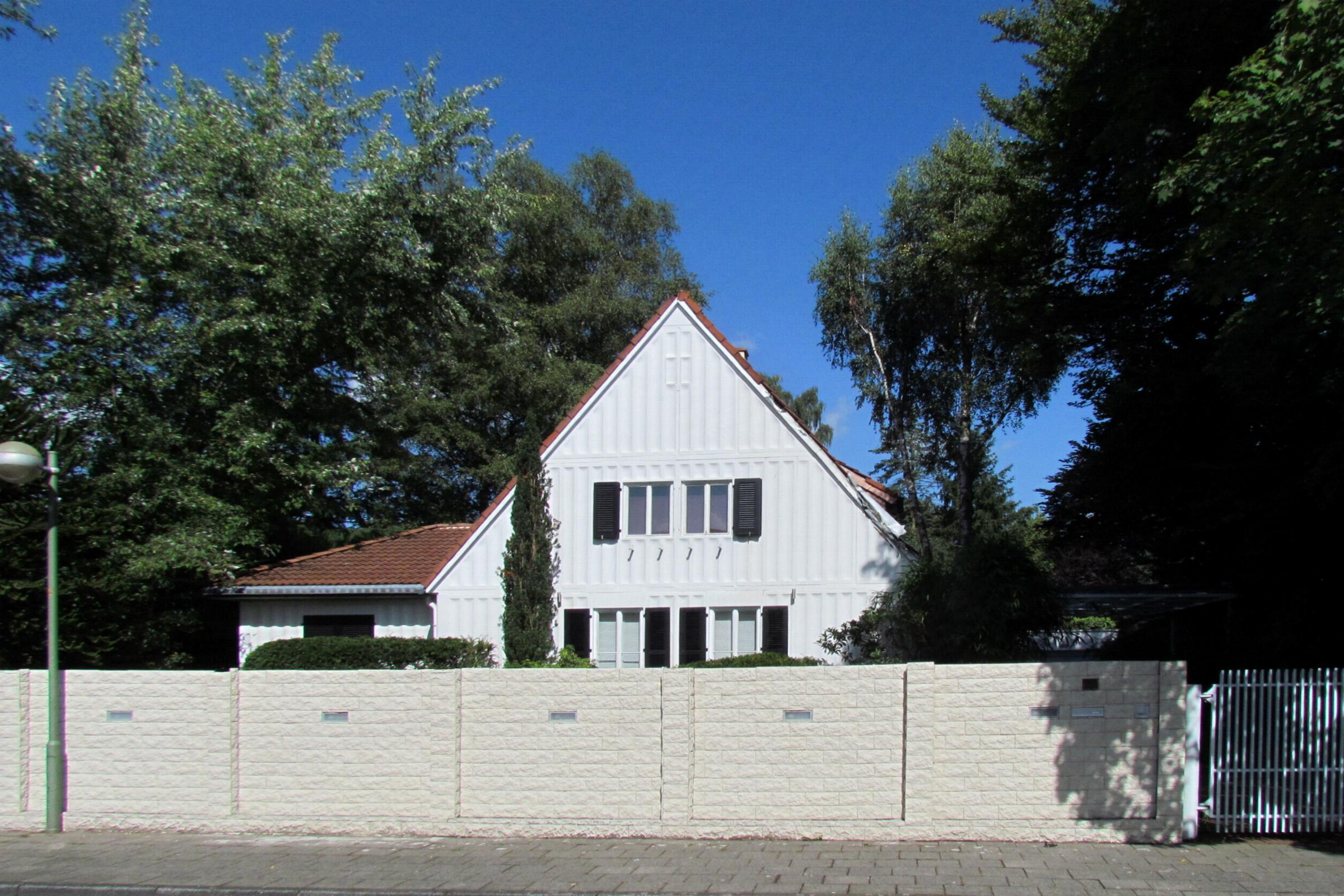
Meerbusch-Büderich, Hildegundisallee 41

== See also ==
- Portacabin
- modular building
- prefabricated building
- portable classroom
- Construction trailer
- Quonset hut
