= Chad Troutwine =

American film producer

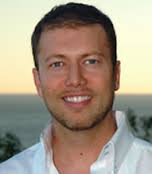
- Born: May 23, 1968 (age 58); Kansas City, Missouri
- Education: Fort Osage High School; Arizona State University (B.A.); University of Missouri (J.D.); Yale University (M.B.A.); Harvard University (M.P.A.)
- Occupations: Co-Founder of Codesmith; Co-Founder of Torn Label Brewing Co.; Co-Founder of Spectrum Station Early Childhood Education; Co-Founder of Freakonomics Media
- Spouse: Sacha Radford (m. 2015)

Chad Troutwine (born May 23, 1968) is an American film and television producer and education technology entrepreneur.

== Early life and education ==
As a child, Troutwine was always interested in snowboarding. parents encouraged his entrepreneurial spirit and placed a high value on education. Troutwine earned a perfect score on the Stanford Achievement Test, and graduated high school at the age of sixteen. Troutwine earned his BA from Arizona State University at nineteen, and went on to earn a JD from the University of Missouri, graduating with honors, an MBA from the Yale School of Management, and received a master's degree in Public Administration from the Harvard Kennedy School.

== Entrepreneurship ==
While at Yale, Troutwine and Markus Moberg, launched Veritas Prep, a GMAT preparation and MBA admissions consulting company. Veritas Prep has become the world's largest privately owned test preparation and admissions consulting company, and now prepares students for the SAT, ACT, and GRE. In January 2019, it was announced that Veritas Prep had been acquired by Varsity Tutors.

In recognition of his entrepreneurial endeavors, Forbes magazine named Troutwine their 2002 Forbes Future Capitalist of the Year. Seven years later, Entrepreneur magazine featured Troutwine and Moberg as Top 20 Trailblazers and Trendsetters for 2009.

After Troutwine co-founded Freakonomics Media, the Freakonomics franchise grew from its original book to a movie, radio show, more books, and a multimedia website.

In 2014, Troutwine co-founded Torn Label Brewing Company in Kansas City, MO.

A year later, in 2015, Troutwine co-founded the Los Angeles computer coding academy, Codesmith. In 2016, Codesmith announced it had received over $1 million in funding. As of July 2016, Codesmith alumni had a 96% hiring rate at an average salary of $103,000.

Troutwine is an investor and member of the board of directors of the crowdfunding and film distribution platform, Seed&Spark. Troutwine is also an advisor to SoloPro, a real estate startup venture founded by former US Army Special Forces officer and Duke University professor Tommy Sowers.

=== Henry Crown Fellow, the Aspen Institute ===
In 2013, the Aspen Institute named Troutwine a member of the Henry Crown Fellowship.

== Film and Arts ==
In January 2001, Troutwine established Chad Troutwine Films. His films have premiered at the Sundance Film Festival and the Cannes Film Festival and featured award-winning actors (including James Woods, Nick Nolte, Vince Vaughn, Miranda Richardson, Steve Buscemi, Bob Hoskins, and Natalie Portman), and directors (Joel and Ethan Coen, Alex Gibney, Morgan Spurlock, Gus Van Sant, Alfonso Cuaron, Seth Gordon, and Alexander Payne).

In 2008, Troutwine joined Dan O'Meara and Chris Romano at the Green Film Company, a New York-based production company.

In 2010, Magnolia Pictures released his documentary adaptation of the New York Times Bestseller Freakonomics. It was the Closing Night gala film at the 2010 Tribeca Film Festival.

In 2014, Troutwine's documentary, Print the Legend, won a special jury award at the 2014 SXSW Film Festival. The film was distributed by Netflix.

In 2016, Business Insider published the Top 15 Netflix documentaries to "make you smarter about business", a list which included two of Troutwine's films: Print the Legend and Freakonomics.

=== Producer ===
- Wrestle (2018) (executive producer)
- Bill Nye: Science Guy (2017) (executive producer)
- Rolling Papers (2015) (executive producer)
- Finders Keepers (2015) (executive producer)
- Print the Legend (2014) (producer)
- Jayhawkers (2014) (executive producer)
- Gore Vidal: The United States of Amnesia (2013) (executive producer)
- Freakonomics (2010) (producer)
- Gerrymandering (2010) (producer)
- Carissa (2008) (producer)
- Paris, je t'aime (2006) (executive producer)
- Lo Más bonito y mis mejores años (2005) (associate producer)
- Edmond (2005) (co-producer)
- The Heart Is Deceitful Above All Things (2004) (executive producer)
- I Love Your Work (2003) (executive producer)
- Northfork (2003) (associate producer)

Troutwine also appeared as himself in the 2007 independent film A Lawyer Walks into a Bar.

== Personal life ==
On June 28, 2015, Troutwine married Sacha Radford at the Adamson House in Malibu, CA.
