= Pacific Oaks College =

College in Pasadena, California

- Motto: Diversity, Inclusion, Social Justice & Respect
- Type: Private college
- Established: 1958
- President: Breeda McGrath
- Students: 1200 undergraduate and graduate students
- Location: Pasadena, California, United States
- Campus: Suburban, 4-acre (1.6 ha) campus in Pasadena
- Colors: Green and Orange
- Website: www.pacificoaks.edu

Pacific Oaks College is a private college with its main campus in Pasadena, California. The college draws on Quaker principles and focuses on social justice. It offers full and part-time undergraduate and graduate courses at Pacific Oaks' California campuses as well as online. Pacific Oaks also operates a children's school that has been in operation since 1945.

== History ==
In 1945, the Pacific Oaks Friends School opened with 10 teachers and 65 children aged two to four. Pacific Oaks College was founded in 1958 following five years of offering upper-division courses through the UCLA Extension.

== Academics ==
The college offers Doctorate in Education, Master of Arts, and Bachelor of Arts degrees in addition to post-graduate teaching certification. The programs are organized into two schools:

- School of Cultural and Family Psychology
- School of Human Development & Education

== Campuses ==
=== Pasadena campus ===
The main campus is located in Pasadena, California at the north end of Old Pasadena. The school can be accessed via the nearby Memorial Park Station of the Metro L Line light rail and sits north of the Ventura Freeway (SR 134) and Foothill Freeway (I-210) junction.

=== Off-campus sites ===
In addition to its main campus in Pasadena, Pacific Oaks offers classes at sites throughout the state of California.

=== Andrew Norman Library ===
The Andrew Norman Library on the Eureka (Pasadena) Campus supports the degree programs of Pacific Oaks College and Pacific Oaks Children's School, as well as independent faculty research. The collection, which has more than 17,000 titles centers on early childhood education and curriculum development, human development, family systems and therapy, and child care.

== Accreditation and affiliations ==
Pacific Oaks College is accredited by the WASC Senior College and University Commission. Pacific Oaks has been accredited by WASC or its successor organization since 1959. Its M.A. in MFT program satisfies all of the requirements of the Board of Behavioral Sciences (BBS), (Business & Professions Code Sections 4980.41 (a) (d) (e)) for licensing in Marriage and Family Therapy. Its Teacher Education Program is certified by the California Commission on Teacher Credentialing (CCTC) for certification in Education Specialist Credential, Mild to Moderate Disabilities Level I & Level II, and Preliminary Multiple Subject English Learner Teaching Credential.

The college is also affiliated with The Community Solution Education System, the Association of Independent Colleges and Universities (California), and the Hispanic Association of Colleges and Universities.

== Notable alumni ==
- Leah Ayres, actor
- Antonia Darder, scholar, poet, activist, public intellectual
- Bre Pettis, entrepreneur, artist, co-founder of MakerBot Industries
