= Preform =

Preform may refer to:

- Preform, a piece of glass used to draw an optical fiber
- Preform, a piece of polyethylene terephthalate test tube shaped form blown into a completed bottle
- Preform, an incomplete and unused basic form of a stone tool in lithic reduction
- Preform, a specially designed shape of solder
- Preform, a high quality, precision metal stamping used for a variety of brazing and joining applications
- PreForm, a a software package from 3D printing technology company Formlabs

== See also ==
- Perform
- Preformationism, a theory that organisms develop from miniature versions of themselves
