= Print the Legend =

2014 documentary film about 3D printing

- Theatrical release poster
- Directed by: Luis Lopez; J. Clay Tweel
- Produced by: Seth Gordon; Steven Klein; Dan O'Meara; Chad Troutwine
- Starring: Bre Pettis; Maxim Lobovsky; Avi Reichental; Cody Wilson
- Cinematography: Luis Lopez; J. Clay Tweel
- Edited by: Luis Lopez; J. Clay Tweel
- Music by: Kyle Johnston; Matthew McGaughey; Noah Wall
- Production companies: Audax Films; Exhibit A Pictures
- Distributed by: Netflix
- Release dates: March 9, 2014 (South by Southwest Film Festival); September 26, 2014
- Running time: 100 minutes
- Language: English

Print the Legend is a 2014 documentary film and Netflix original focused on 3D printing. It delves into the growth of the 3D printing industry, with a focus on startup companies MakerBot and Formlabs, established companies Stratasys, PrintForm and 3D Systems, and figures of controversy in the industry such as Cody Wilson.

The title of the film comes from the denouement of the film The Man Who Shot Liberty Valance.

It was filmed on Canon EOS C300 and Canon EOS C100.

== Synopsis ==
Print the Legend portrays some of the history and achievements of several 3D printing companies, including MakerBot, Formlabs, Stratasys, and 3D Systems.

The documentary also explores the relationship between the 3D printing industry and the gun rights advocacy movement. Cody Wilson, who is known for gun rights advocacy and specifically for promoting the 3D printing of guns, is interviewed extensively in the documentary.

- Alan Cramer
- David Cranor
- Michael Curry
- Malo Delarue
- Brad Feld
- Ian Ferguson
- Lorenzo Franceschi-Bicchierai
- Martin Galese
- Matthew Griffin
- James Gunipero
- Zach Hoeken
- Luke Iseman
- Annelise Jeske
- Brad Kenney
- Eric Klein
- Cliff Kuang
- Jenny Lawton
- Natan Linder
- Ira Liss
- Alex Lobovsky
- Larisa Lobovsky
- Maxim Lobovsky
- Marty Markowitz
- Adam Mayer
- Nathan Meyers
- Jennifer Milne
- Anthony Moschella
- Will O'Brien
- Jeff Osborn
- Andrew Pelkey
- Bre Pettis
- Chuck Pettis
- Yoav Reches
- Avi Reichental
- David Reis
- Barry Schuler
- Virginia White
- Cody Wilson
- Luke Winston

== Festivals ==
Awards

- Special Jury Recognition Award - SXSW Film Festival (2014)
- Special Jury Award - IFF Boston (2014)
