= Ultimaker =

Dutch 3D printer manufacturer

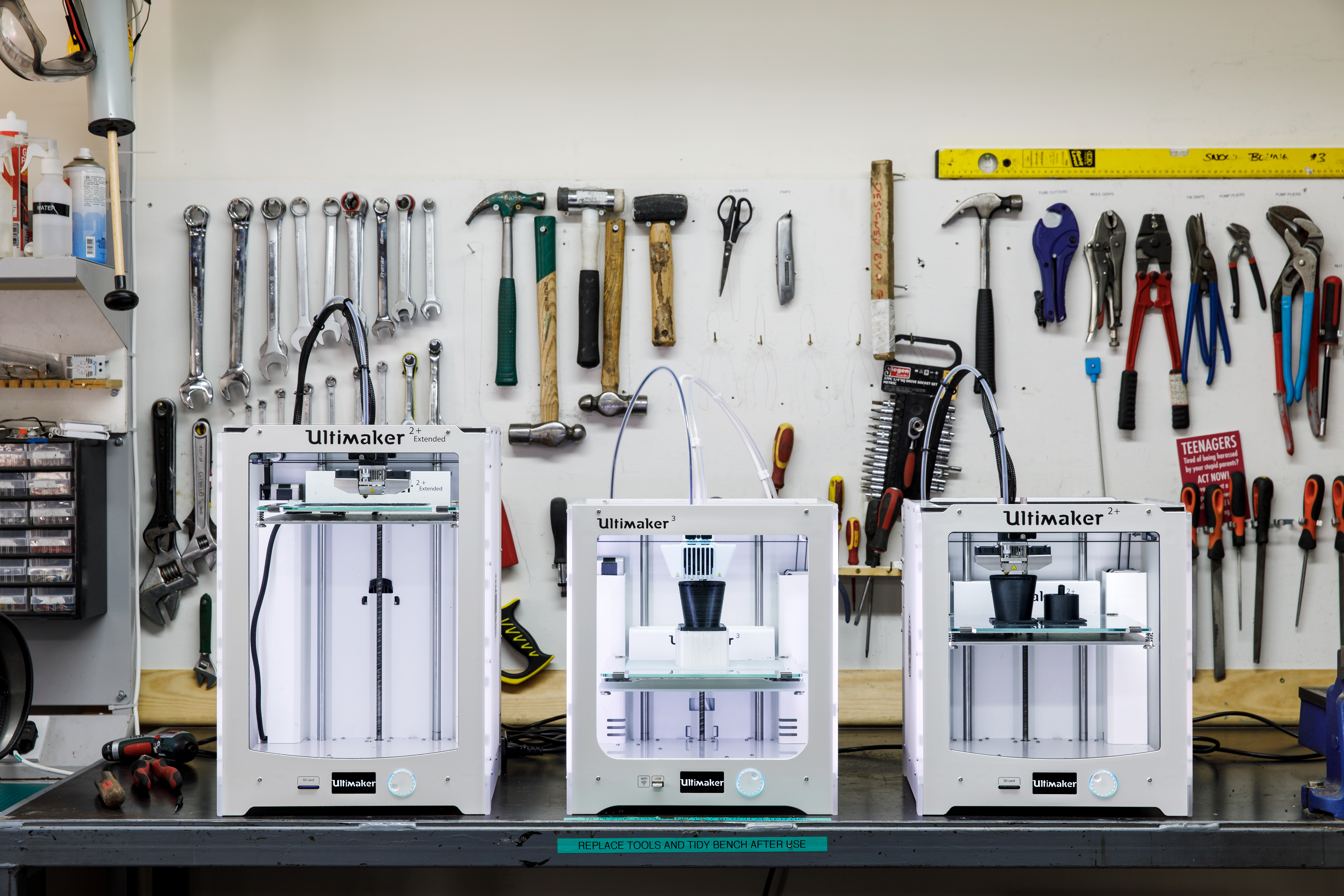
- From right to left: Ultimaker's most successful 3D printer, the Ultimaker 2+, the next generation version, the dual extrusion Ultimaker 3, and the stretched version of the Ultimaker 2+, the Ultimaker 2 Extended+
- Industry: 3D printing
- Founded: 2011; 15 years ago
- Founders: Martijn Elserman; Erik de Bruijn; Siert Wijnia
- Headquarters: Utrecht, Netherlands
- Number of locations: The Netherlands, United States, Singapore
- Products: 3D printers, filaments, and 3D printing software
- Number of employees: 400 (2019)
- Website: ultimaker.com

Ultimaker is a 3D printer manufacturing company based in the Netherlands, with offices and assembly lines in the US. They make fused filament fabrication 3D printers, develop 3D printing software, and sell branded 3D printing materials. Their product line includes the Ultimaker S5 and S3, Ultimaker 3 series, Ultimaker 2+ series and Ultimaker Original+. These products are used by industries such as automotive, architecture, healthcare, education, and small scale manufacturing.

== History ==
Ultimaker BV is a Dutch 3D printer company that was founded in 2011 by Martijn Elserman, Erik de Bruijn, and Siert Wijnia. Ultimaker started selling their products in May 2011. The company's foundation was laid at ProtoSpace Utrecht where Wijnia organized two workshops to build the RepRap Darwin 3D printer. Two Beta-workshops were organized at ProtoSpace Utrecht starting in September and December 2010, each consisting of 10 Monday evenings. Erik de Bruijn and Martijn Elserman assisted at those workshops. Frustration from their inability to get the Darwin design to work led to the inspiration to create their own design. Instead of sticking to the RepRap principle that their printer should be able to print its own parts, they designed their printer to be built mostly of laser cut plywood parts, that could be produced orders of magnitude faster than printed parts at the time. Their first prototypes bore the name "Ultimaker protobox" but newer prototypes were just titled "Ultimaker". In March 2011, Ultimaker ltd. released their first complete product, the "Ultimaker" (renamed in 2013 to "Ultimaker Original") under a Creative Commons BY-NC license. The Ultimaker Original was distributed as a Do It Yourself kit that hobbyists and technicians assembled themselves. It could print objects up to 210 mm x 210 mm x 205 mm at a maximum resolution of 20 microns.

=== Company milestones ===
2013

- The Ultimaker 2 is released. The target markets are home-users, schools, and libraries, small businesses, and industrial designers who use 3D printing for rapid prototyping and production.

2015

- Ultimaker's revenue doubles, with 35% of new customers coming from the North American market.

2017

- Ultimaker's U.S. presence grows to include a network of 37 re-sellers.

2018

- Ultimaker partners with material manufacturers DSM, BASF, DuPont Transportation & Advanced Polymers, Owens Corning, Mitsubishi, Henkel, Kuraray, Solvay and Clariant to create material profiles for printing high-level engineering plastics and composites.
- Ultimaker opens a facility in Singapore to service Asia, Pacific and China markets and expands its manufacturing presence to three continents.

2018

- The Ultimaker S5 is released. This is the company's first "large format" 3D printer, and it is also the first Ultimaker that can print with composite materials, such as Glass and Carbon Fiber Filled Nylons straight from the factory with no modifications needed.

2019

- Arkema joins material alliance program and releases FluorX filament.
- The company moves its headquarters to Utrecht, The Netherlands.
- The Ultimaker S3 is released. The S3 is a smaller version of the S5 and is practically very similar to the Ultimaker 3, though with an LED touchscreen identical to that on the S5 and a hinged glass door. The S3 also includes presets for composite materials, and a re-engineered feeder wheel to accommodate them.

2020

- The Ultimaker 2+ Connect is released. The printer is an updated version of the Ultimaker 2+, featuring a TFT touchscreen in place of the older LCD and rotary control wheel, the SD Card slot has been replaced with a USB slot, the feeder wheel has been upgraded and the build plate has been improved.

2022

- Ultimaker and MakerBot announce merger, completed in August. NPM Capital owns 53.5% of the combined company, while Stratasys owns the remaining 46.5%

== Software ==
Their first software ran under a modified version of Replicator-G. They changed this later to Cura because more and more users started using this software in favor of Replicator-G, which was originally produced with Makerbot in mind. When the lead developer for Cura started working for Ultimaker, Ultimaker Cura became the lead software product for Ultimaker. Cura rapidly became a favorite of 3D printing enthusiasts. A YouMagine Survey found that 58% of users surveyed used Cura, compared to 23% that used Slic3r. On September 26, 2017, the company announced that Cura had achieved one million users. This announcement was made at the TCT show. With the release of Cura 4.0, Ultimaker users were able to back up their files to the cloud. As of 2020 the software was processing 1.4 million jobs per week.

== Printers ==
=== Ultimaker Original ===
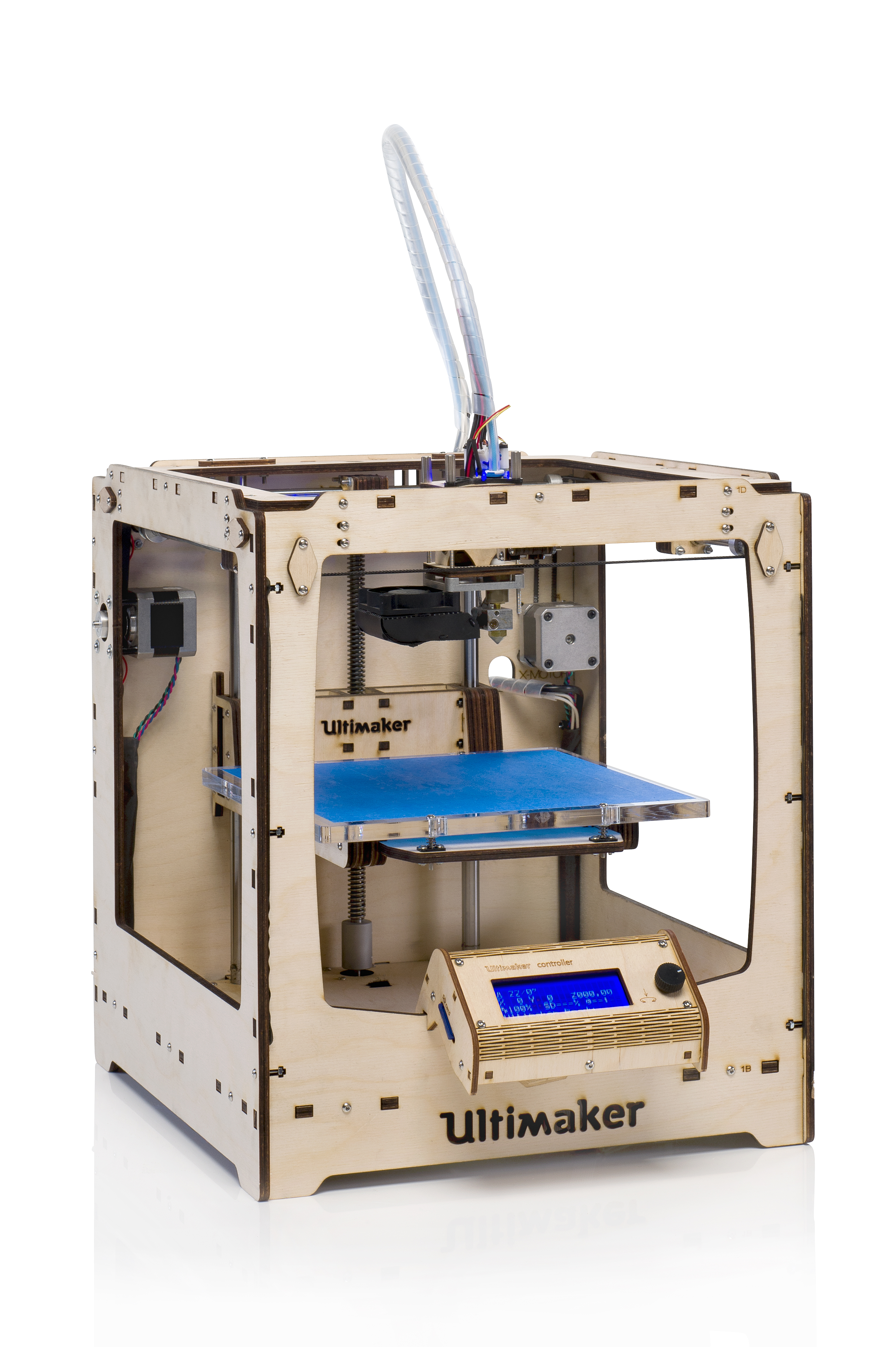
The Ultimaker Original

The Ultimaker Original is the predecessor of the Ultimaker 2 and was released only a few months after the company was founded. The Ultimaker Original is sold as a kit containing laser-cut wood and technical components. The printer must be assembled by the user and is thus able to be tailored to the user's preference and modified to their will. In 2012, the Ultimaker Original was awarded Fastest and Most Accurate 3D printer available by MAKE Magazine.

=== Ultimaker Original+ ===
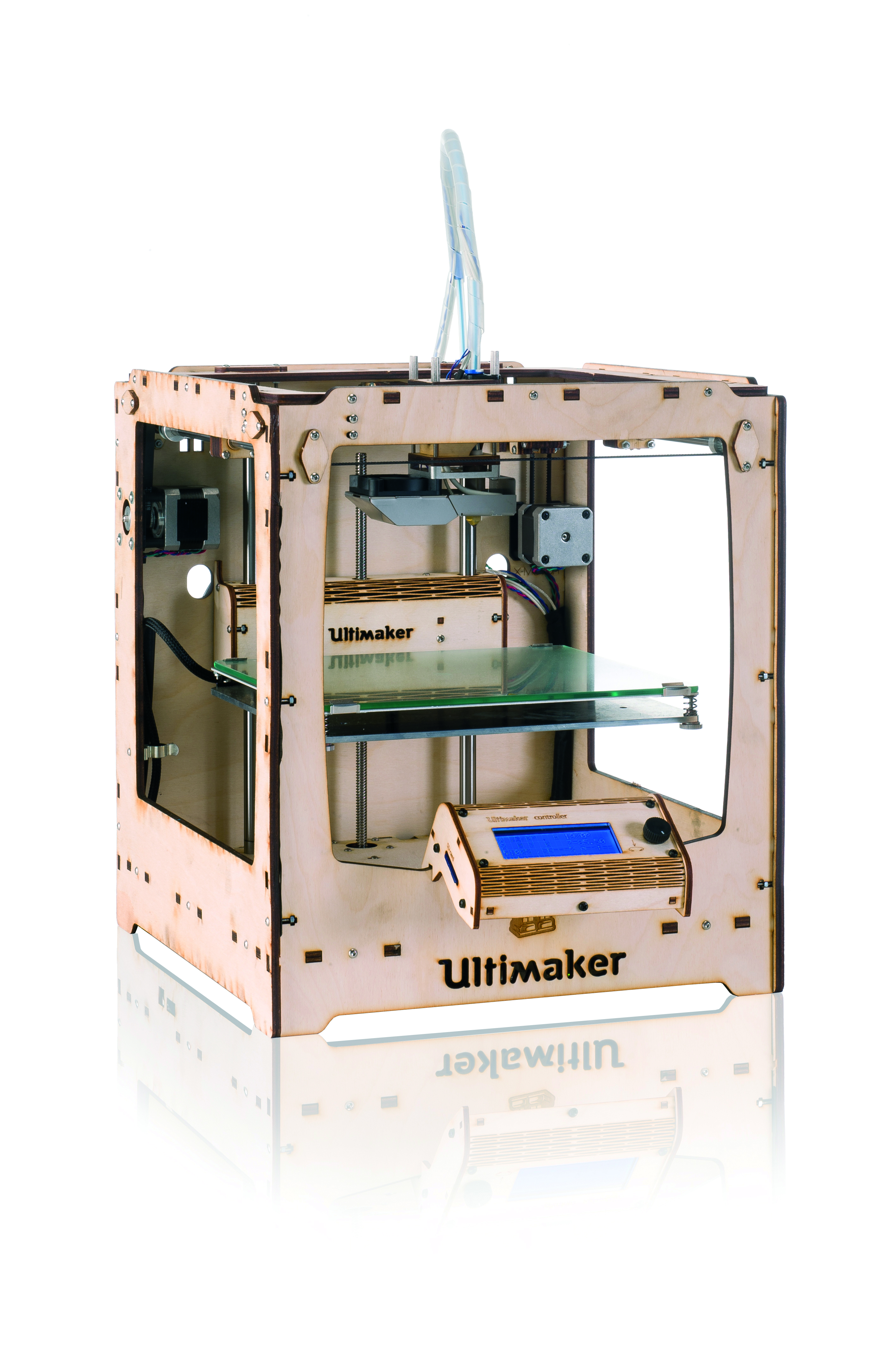
The Ultimaker Original+

The Ultimaker Original+ is the main successor to the Ultimaker Original. It has an upgraded 24V power supply and heated build plate, however, it is not compatible with dual extrusion due to the limitations of the power supply.

=== Ultimaker 2 ===
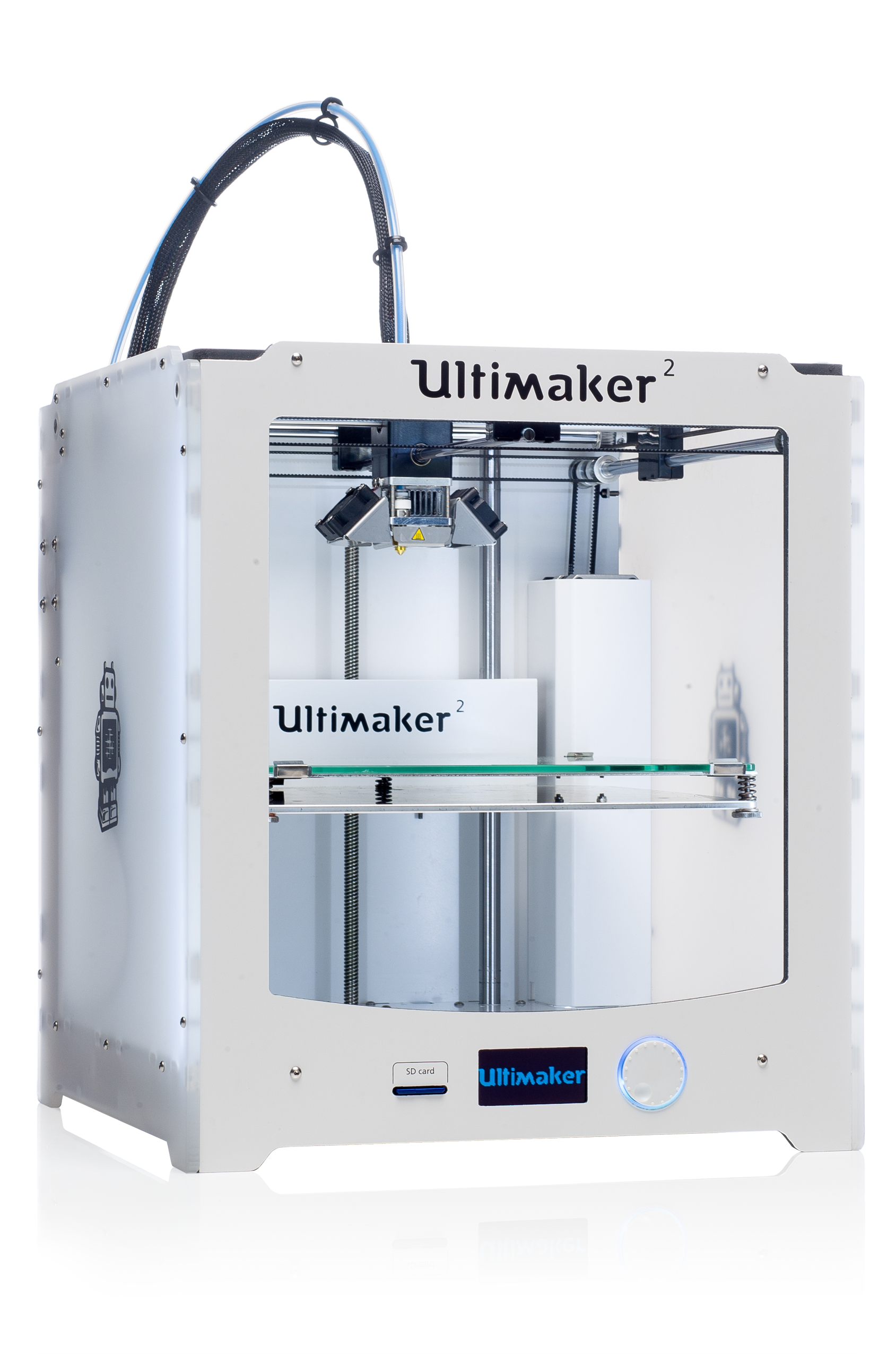
The Ultimaker 2

The Ultimaker 2 is Ultimaker's first out-of-the-box 3D printer. After transportation, the user must calibrate the build plate and insert filament before printing. The Ultimaker 2 was released in 2013 and laid the foundations for a further two printers to be added to the family before it was upgraded in 2015. Like the rest of the family, it uses an SD card to print and an LCD screen and rotary wheel to navigate through its menus. The Ultimaker 2 is also single extrusion only.

=== Ultimaker 2 Go ===
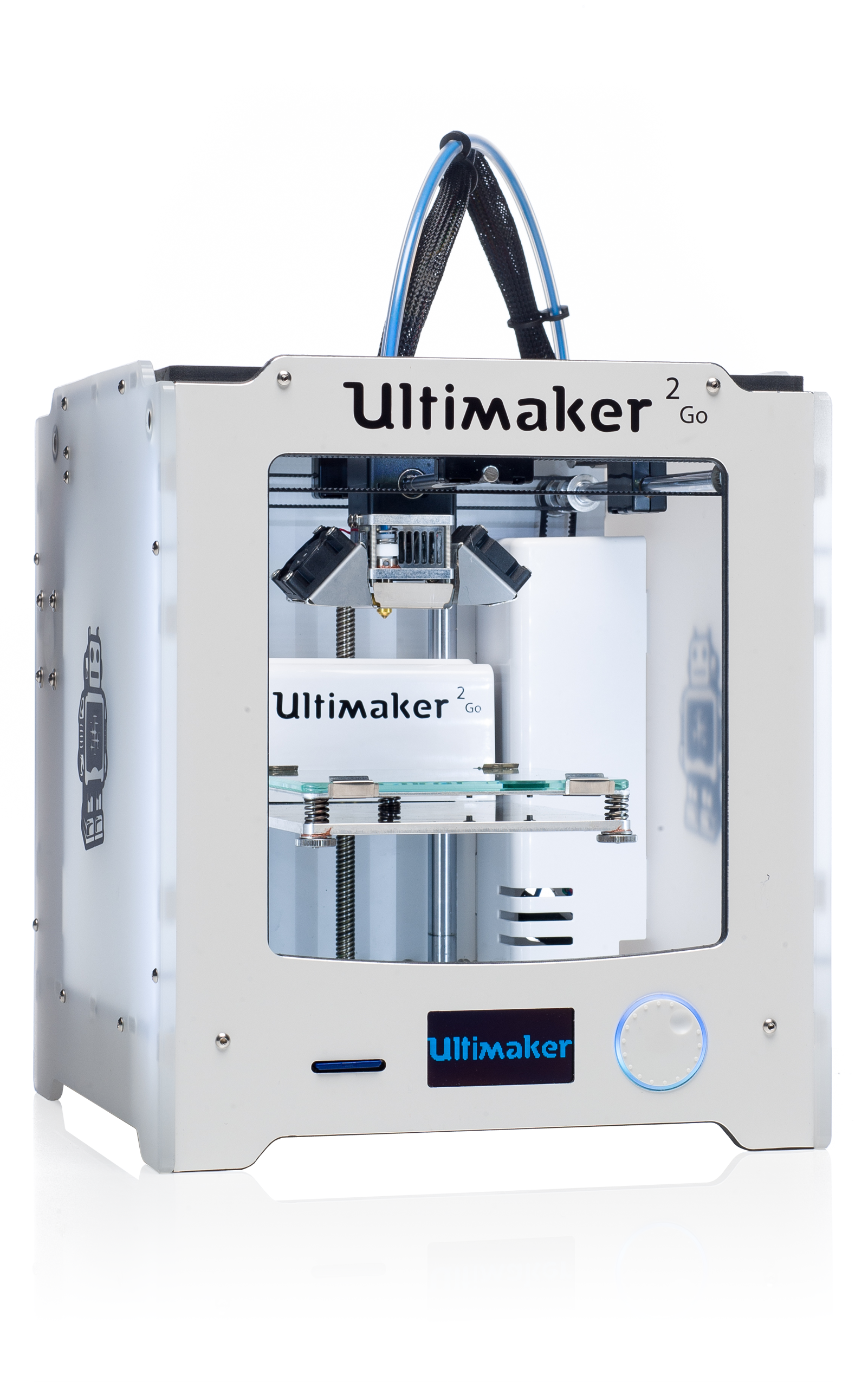
The Ultimaker 2 Go

The Ultimaker 2 Go is a compact and portable version of the Ultimaker 2. The printer has an exceptionally small build volume of just 120x120x115mm, allowing it to be moved from place to place in the special backpack provided. The Ultimaker 2 Go's smaller size does come at a cost, however as the build plate is not heated and it is thus highly recommended to apply masking tape to the build plate before printing.

=== Ultimaker 2 Extended ===
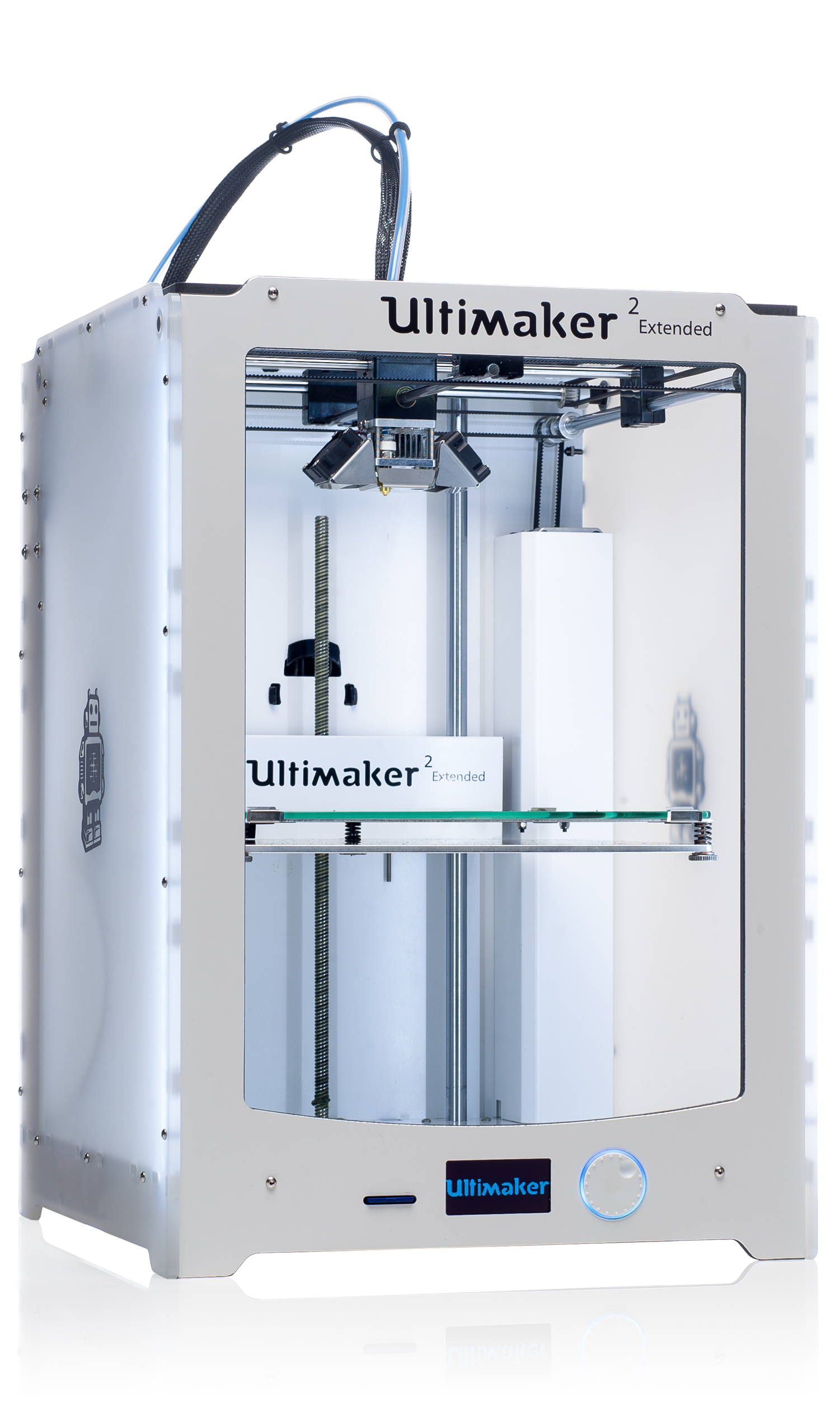
The Ultimaker 2 Extended

The Ultimaker 2 Extended is technically and physically identical to the Ultimaker 2, except for its 100mm higher build volume. It and the Ultimaker 2 Go were released simultaneously in April 2015.

=== Ultimaker 2+ ===
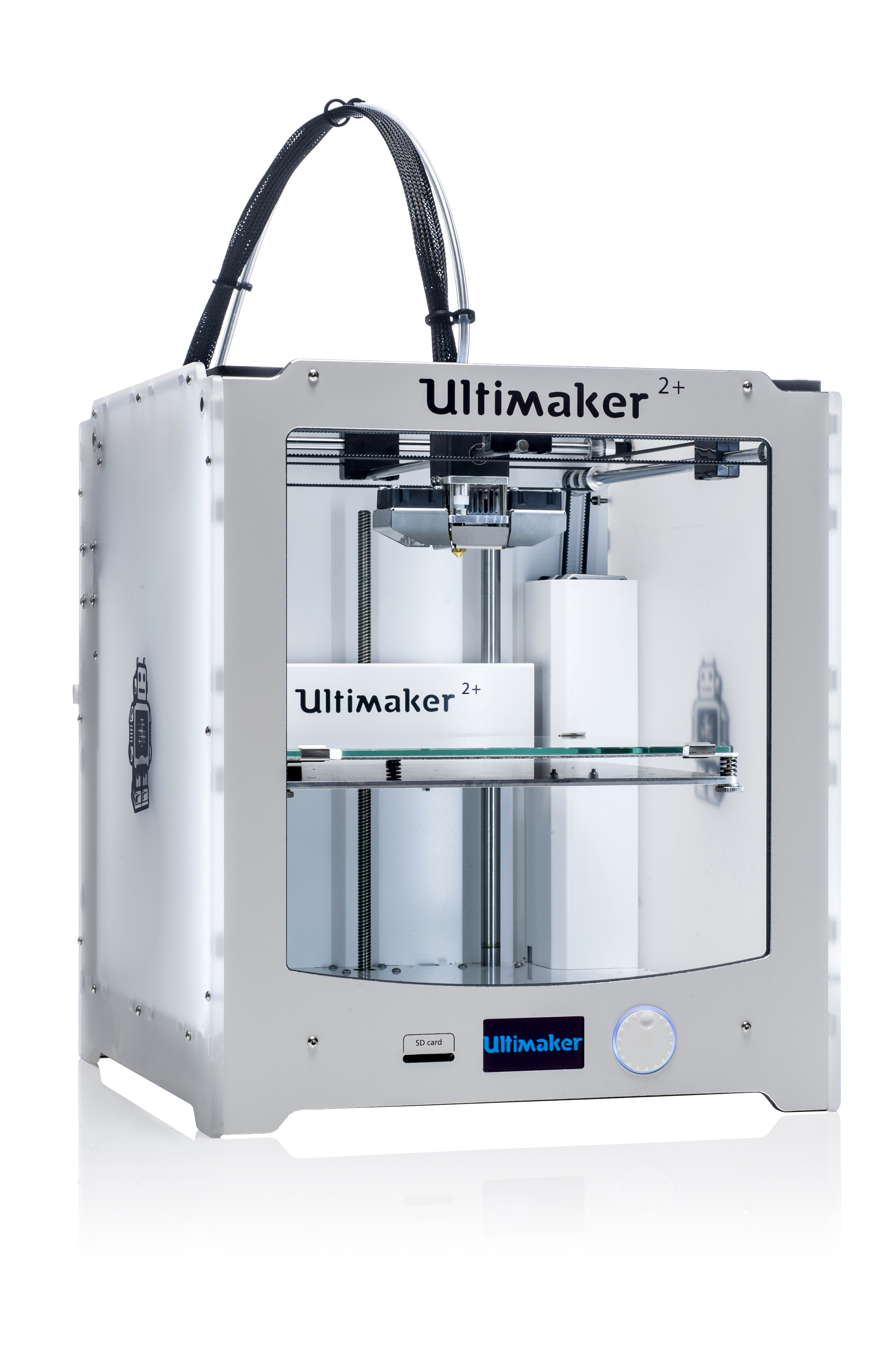
The Ultimaker 2+

The Ultimaker 2+ is the upgraded successor to the Ultimaker 2. It features an improved feeder wheel and tensioning system, interchangeable nozzles, and a redesigned nozzle heating system and fan.

=== Ultimaker 2 Extended+ ===
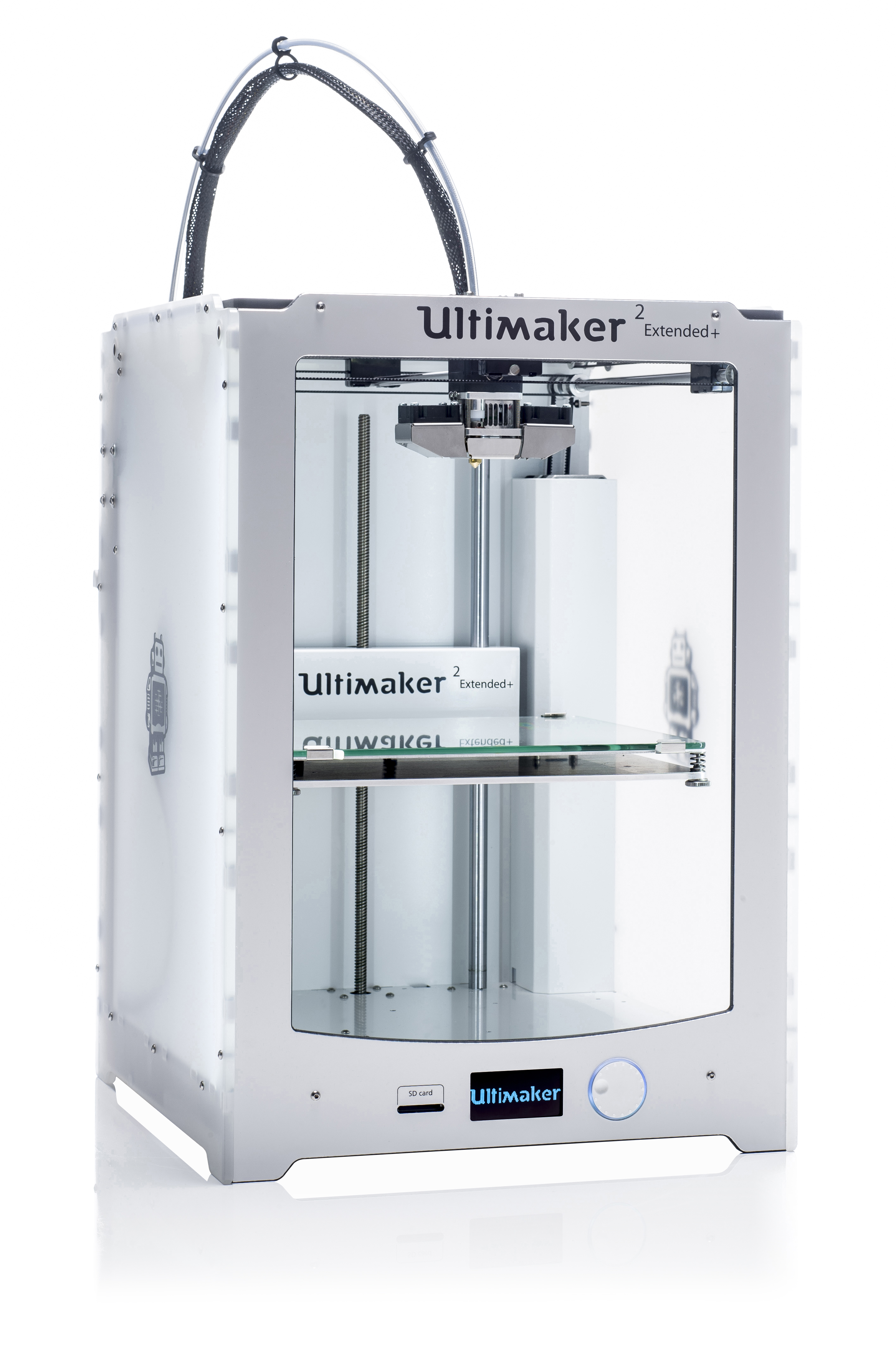
The Ultimaker 2 Extended+

The Ultimaker 2 Extended+ is a taller version of the Ultimaker 2+ and an upgraded version of the Ultimaker 2 Extended. Again, its print volume is 100mm higher but it is otherwise technically indifferent to its normal-sized version.

=== Ultimaker 3 ===
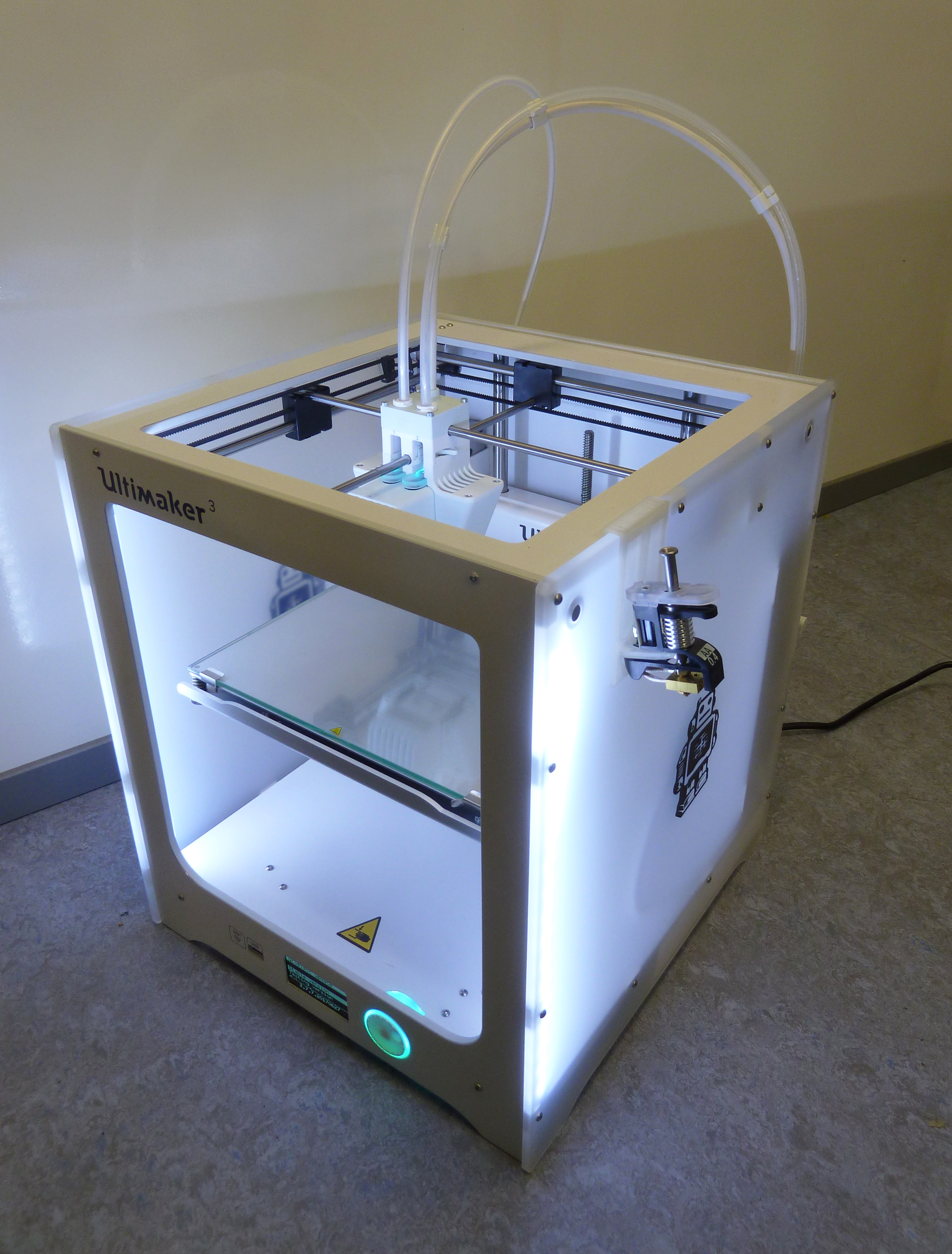
The Ultimaker 3 with a spare PrintCore attached to the side of the printer

The Ultimaker 3 is the successor to the successful Ultimaker 2+ family. It features dual extrusion, and compatibility with various other Ultimaker materials including PVA, PC, ABS, Nylon, and Breakaway. It was released in October 2016. The LCD control screen is recolored from blue to white and the navigation of the menus has been updated. In addition to this, when an Ultimaker material is placed on the spool holder, the Ultimaker 3 will automatically detect the material and its color through NFC, along with an estimate of its remaining length. In 2019, The Mediahq recognized the Ultimaker 3 as the Best 3D Printer of 2019 for Enthusiasts.

=== Ultimaker 3 Extended ===
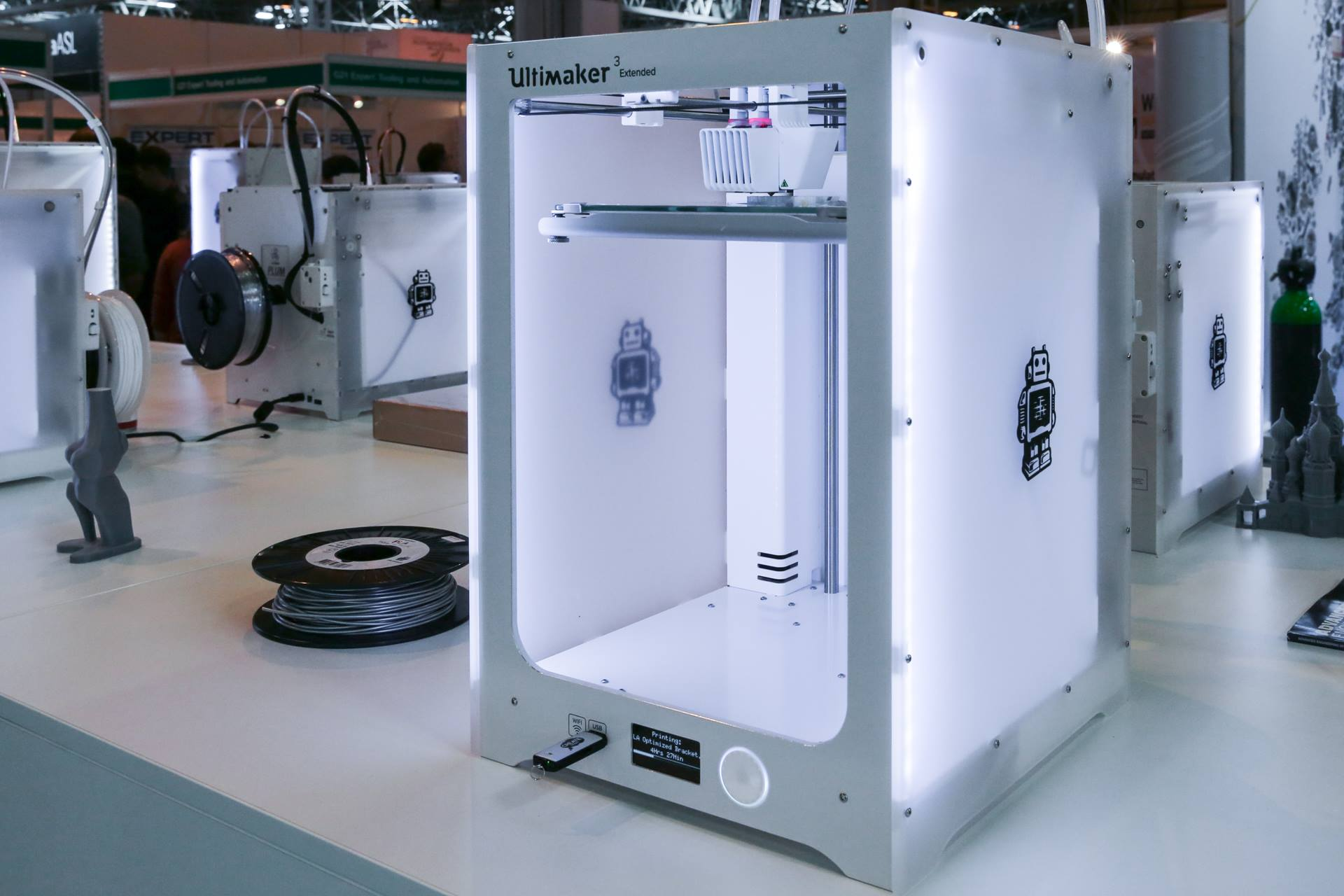
The Ultimaker 3 Extended

The Ultimaker 3 Extended is a stretched version of the Ultimaker 3. Like the Ultimaker 2 Extended and 2 Extended+, the build volume is 100mm higher than on the Ultimaker 3.

=== Ultimaker S5 ===
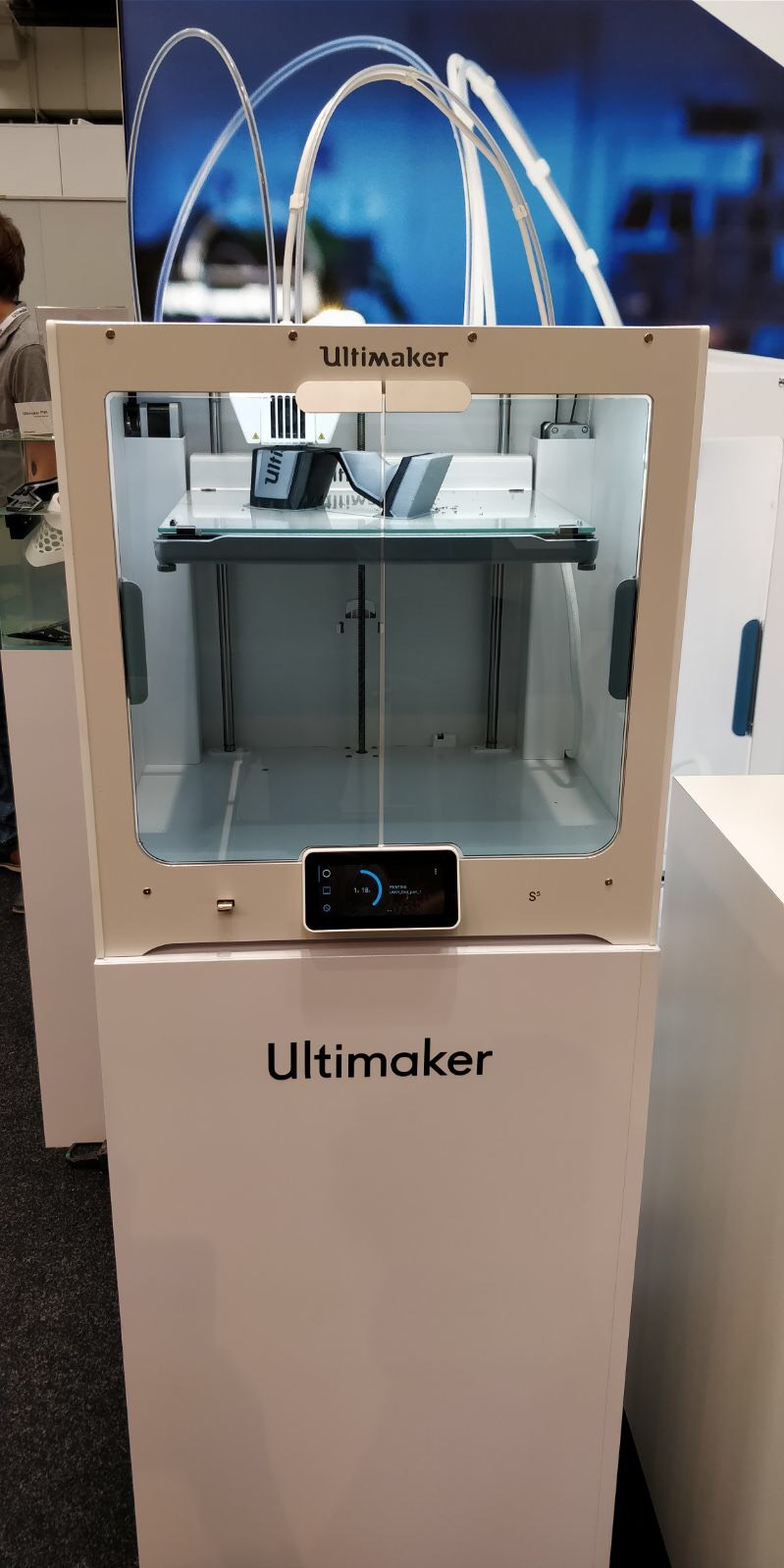
The Ultimaker S5

The Ultimaker S5 is the first member of Ultimaker's "S-line" printer family. It has the biggest build volume of an Ultimaker printer to date by all dimensions and the build volume is consistent with both nozzles and dual extrusion. The Ultimaker S5 has a 4.7" color touchscreen replacing the older LCD screen and rotary wheel, a feeder system that pauses when material runs out and is compatible with glass and carbon fiber composites, among many other materials, and a pair of hinged glass doors. Like the Ultimaker 3, the S5 prints from a USB drive, LAN, or Wi-Fi. However, unlike the Ultimaker 3, the S5 was developed for the professional market. It is certified by Materialise for FDA-approved medical applications.

=== Ultimaker S3 ===
In September 2019, the S3 was introduced as a smaller alternative to the S5. Like the S5, it was developed for the professional market. The S3 occupies a smaller footprint than the S5 and offers a smaller build volume. The dual extruders print using almost any 2.85 filaments, including abrasive filaments.

=== Ultimaker 2+ Connect ===
The Ultimaker 2+ Connect is the upgraded successor to the Ultimaker 2+. It features a new feeder design similar to that of the S3 and S5 printers, as well as a completely redesigned electronics system to add a 2.4" touchscreen, cloud integration, and support for the optional air manager accessory. The Ultimaker 2+ Connect was designed for makers, professionals, and the education market. Similarly to all previous Ultimakers, it uses Ultimaker Cura for slicing and 2.85mm filament for the material spools. Unlike all printers released by Ultimaker from 2016 to 2019, it lacked the dual extrusion and NFC chip support that the Ultimaker 3/3 Extended and S3/S5 had.

== Add-ons ==
=== Ultimaker materials ===
In addition to making 3D printers, Ultimaker also manufacturers materials for their printers. These include:

- Polypropylene (PP)
- Polyvinyl acetate (PVA)
- Acrylonitrile butadiene styrene (ABS)
- Polylactic acid (PLA)
- Tough PLA,
- Copolyester (CPE)
- Nylon
- Polycarbonate (PC)
- Thermoplastic polyurethane (TPU 95A)
- Breakaway

A breakaway material was developed and released in 2017 to support multi-extrusion printing and reduce post-printing processing time.

=== Dual Extrusion Pack ===
As the Ultimaker Original had to be assembled by the user, it was extensively modified and tinkered with. Many people added a second nozzle to the printer, allowing for dual extrusion. For a brief period of time, Ultimaker themselves sold a Dual Extrusion Pack, allowing users to have dual extrusion without having to experiment extensively.

=== Ultimaker S5 Pro bundle ===
The S5 Pro bundle was announced at the TCT Show in September 2019. The S5 Pro bundle is an upgrade of the Ultimaker S5. It includes the S5 air manager to provide a closed environment for printing to keep ultra-fine particles out of the air while printing and the S5 material station that can hold up to 6 spools of filament for continuous 24/7 printing and to keep fragile materials such as PVA in an ideal temperature- and humidity-controlled environment. The company developed the setup as a bridge between industrial 3D printers and desktop printers.

== Specifications ==
Variant	Ultimaker Original	Ultimaker 2	Ultimaker 2 Go	Ultimaker 2 Extended	Ultimaker 3	Ultimaker 3 Extended	Ultimaker S5	Ultimaker S3	Ultimaker 2+ Connect
Release date	March 2011	September 2013	April 2015	April 2015	October 2016	October 2016	April 2018	September 2019	November 2020
Build volume	210 mm × 210 mm × 205 mm	223 mm × 223 mm × 205 mm	120 mm × 120 mm × 115 mm	223 mm × 223 mm × 305 mm	215 mm x 215 mm x 200 mm	215 mm x 215 mm x 300 mm	330 mm x 240 mm x 300 mm	230 mm x 190 mm x 200 mm	223 x 220 x 205 mm
Dual extrusion build volume	Not supported				197 mm x 215 mm x 200 mm	197 mm x 215 mm x 300 mm	330 mm x 240 mm x 300 mm	230 mm x 190 mm x 200 mm	Not Supported
Layer resolution	up to 20 microns				0.25 mm nozzle 150 - 60 micron 0.4 mm nozzle 200 - 20 micron 0.8 mm nozzle 600 - 20 micron				0.25 mm nozzle: 150 - 60 micron 0.4 mm nozzle: 200 - 20 micron 0.6 mm nozzle: 400 - 20 micron 0.8 mm nozzle: 600 - 20 micron
Print speed	30 mm - 300 mm/s						< 24 mm^{3}/s		
Travel speed	30 mm - 350 mm/s								
Filament diameter	2.85 mm recommended				2.85 mm				2.85mm
Nozzle diameter	0.4 mm swappable				0.25 mm, 0.4 mm, 0.8 mm		0.25 mm, 0.4 mm, 0.6 mm, 0.8 mm		0.25 mm, 0.4 mm, 0.6 mm, 0.8 mm
Operating nozzle temperature	180 °C - 260 °C				180 °C - 280 °C				180 °C - 260 °C
Operating heated bed temperature	-	50 °C – 100 °C	-	50 °C - 100 °C	20 °C - 100 °C		20 °C - 140 °C		20 °C - 110 °C
Frame dimensions	357 mm × 342 mm × 388 mm		258 mm × 250 mm × 287.5 mm	493 mm × 342 mm × 688 mm	342 mm x 380 mm x 389 mm	342 mm x 380 mm x 489 mm	495 mm x 457 mm x 520 mm	394 mm x 489 mm x 637 mm	342 mm x 460 mm x 580 mm
Printer technology	Fused Filament Fabrication (FFF)								
Software	Cura (supplied)								
