= Jennifer Lawton =

Businesswoman and applied mathematician

Jennifer Lawton (born 1963) is an American businesswoman and applied mathematician. She is COO of Techstars, a startup accelerator.

== Early life and education ==
Lawton was born in 1963 in Quantico, Virginia. Her family settled in Pennsylvania, where she graduated with honors from Council Rock High School North in 1981. Lawton graduated from Union College with B.S. degree in Applied Mathematics in 1985. Her first job out of college was as an administrative assistant at a small consulting company, R.G. Vanderweil Engineers.

== Career ==
In 1991, she co-founded a computer support consulting firm, Net Daemons Associates (NDA), in Boston. With Lawton's leadership Net Daemons was recognized in the 1998 Inc. 500 list of the fastest-growing privately held United States companies Net Daemons was also on the Deloitte and Touche Fast 50 and Fast 500 lists for 1997 and 1998.

In 2001, Jennifer Lawton left the technology business and became an independent business owner in downtown Old Greenwich, Connecticut. Lawton opened the bookstores Just Books and Just Books as well as Arcadia Cafe.

Lawton reentered the technology business and accepted the position of Chief Strategy Officer at MakerBot. In 2014, Lawton was named the CEO. Under her leadership MakerBot was named Popular Mechanics' "Overall Winner" for best 3D printer, Popular Science's "Product of the Year", one of Time's "Best Inventions of 2012", and Fast Company included it as one of the "World's Top 10 Most Innovative Companies in Consumer Electronics".

On March 1, 2015, Lawton was replaced as MakerBot CEO by Stratasys Asia Pacific Japan general manager Jonathan Jaglom. The move came after Stratasys' disappointing financial performance in 2014 following the acquisition of MakerBot. Lawton took on a new role as VP of Special Projects and left Stratasys four months later.

In 2014, Jennifer Lawton was inducted into the Connecticut Women's Hall of Fame for her work in business and labor.

Jennifer Lawton was named the COO of Techstars in 2016.
