= Bre Pettis =

American entrepreneur (born 1972)

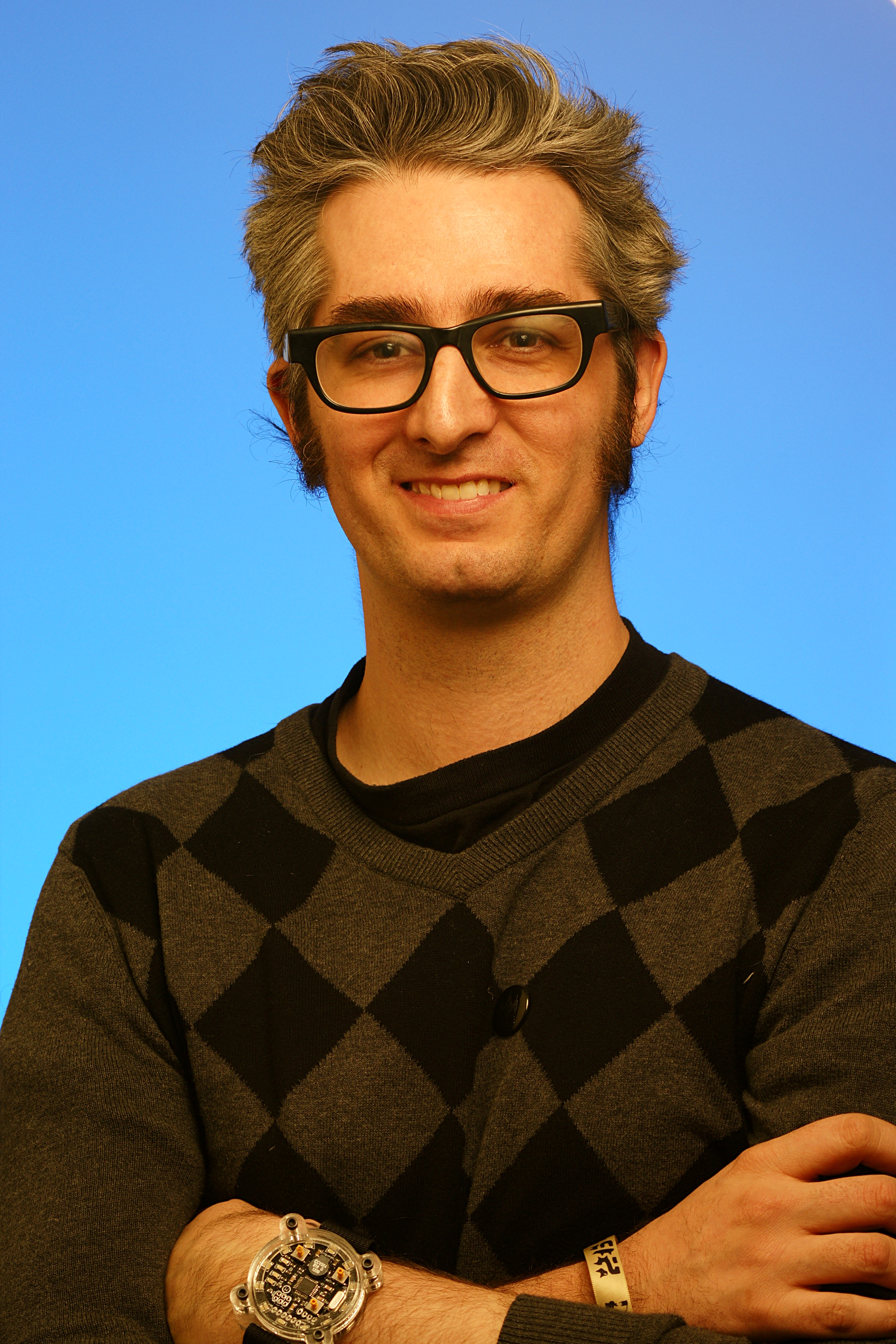
- Pettis in 2009
- Born: July 14, 1972 (age 54)
- Education: Evergreen State College (BA); Pacific Oaks College (Education, teaching certificate)
- Known for: co-founder and former CEO of MakerBot Industries

Bre Pettis (born July 14, 1972) is an American entrepreneur, video blogger, and creative artist. Pettis is best known as the co-founder and former CEO of MakerBot Industries, a 3D printer company now owned by Stratasys.

== Early life and education ==
Pettis was raised in Ithaca, New York, a childhood spent climbing trees and playing in the woods independent and self-reliant. At the age of 13 he moved to the Seattle area, where he later graduated from Bellevue High School. Pettis is a 1995 graduate of The Evergreen State College, where he studied psychology, mythology and performing arts.

After college, Pettis worked as floor runner and camera assistant on feature films in Prague and as an assistant at Jim Henson's Creature Shop in London. He then attended Pacific Oaks College and graduated with a teaching certificate. He worked as a teacher for the Seattle Public Schools from 1999 through 2006.

== Career ==
After graduating and working on various films in Europe, Pettis moved to London and began working at Jim Henson’s Creature Shop and making super-custom animatronics, or high-performance robots. Pettis learned prototyping there, as well as building one-of-a-kind things from scratch, allowing him to eventually be paid for his work.

He is also known for DIY video podcasts for MAKE, and for the History Hacker pilot on the History Channel. He is one of the founders of the Brooklyn-based hacker space NYC Resistor.

Pettis is a co-founder and former CEO of MakerBot Industries, a company that produces 3D printers now owned by Stratasys. Besides being a TV host and Video Podcast producer, he's created new media for Etsy.com, hosted Make: Magazine's Weekend Projects podcast, and has been a schoolteacher, artist, and puppeteer. He was the artist-in-residence of art group monochrom at Museumsquartier Vienna in 2007.

Pettis was featured in the documentary film Print the Legend.

He left Makerbot in 2014.

In June 2017, Pettis acquired start-up Other Machine Co. — now called Bantam Tools — from its founder and CEO, Danielle Applestone. In November 2019, Bantam Tools moved their facilities to Peekskill, New York. In January 2024, Bantam Tools announced that it had acquired Evil Mad Scientist, known for the AxiDraw, a computer-controlled drawing and handwriting machine.
