= Avi Reichental =

Israeli-American business executive

- אבי רייכנטל
- Born: January 7, 1957 (age 68); Israel
- Occupation: Businessman
- Website: avi-reichental.com

Avi Reichental (Hebrew: אבי רייכנטל; born January 7, 1957) is an Israeli-American businessperson in the 3D printing industry. He is the founder and executive chairman of XponentialWorks, a venture investment, advisory and product development company. Reichental is CEO, chairman and co-founder of Nexa3D and co-founder and executive chairman of NXT Factory, Centaur Analytics and ParaMatters.

== Early life and education ==
Reichental was born in Israel in 1957. He studied at the Israeli Air Force high school in Haifa where he learned about aerospace engineering and prepared for his mandatory military service. He began his military service as a helicopter mechanic, and later led a maintenance and overhaul project team responsible for the Sikorsky CH-53 IAF squadrons of the mid-1970s. After completing his service, in 1977, Reichental moved to the US where he began his career.

== Career ==
In 2003 Reichental was recruited to become president and CEO of 3D Systems. While he was its president, 3D Systems acquired several subsidiaries including Quickparts, an on-demand industrial parts manufacturing services, Z Corp, and Geomagic.

In 2014 Reichental was listed as one of the "Top 25 Makers Who Are Reinventing the American Dream" by Popular Mechanics Magazine. The same year he delivered a TED talk titled ‘what's next in 3D printing’.

The following year he stepped down as CEO of 3D Systems, and founded XponentialWorks, where he serves as founder and chairman. Based in Ventura, California, XponentialWorks is a venture, advisory, and product development firm focused on early and mature stage companies in the fields of 3D printing, robotics, artificial intelligence, and deep learning.

In 2016 Reichental co-founded Centaur Analytics, Inc., where he serves as chairman of the board. Centaur Analytics produces wireless grain sensors and an Internet-of-Things platform for monitoring and adjusting postharvest crop storage conditions.

During the same year he co-founded ParaMatters, a creator of production-ready 3D printable designs, together with Michael Bogomolny.

From 2017 through 2019 Reichental served as Vice Chairman of the Board of Techniplas, which manufactures plastic components and modules for the automobile and energy industries, as well as CEO of Techniplas Digital, a business unit within Techniplas that focuses on developing cognitive products and services for the company and its customers.

Reichental was also a General Partner at OurCrowd First, an Israel-based early-stage venture fund for companies in the fields of artificial intelligence, robotics and digital manufacturing from January 2018 until November 2019.

In October 2018 he led XponentialWorks in a collaboration with specialty zinc provider EverZinc to launch EverZinc Digital, a unit dedicated to company innovation, and the development of a startup ecosystem to increase the applications of zinc materials.

== Accolades ==
- 2013 - Reichental was named among Fortune's Top People in Business
- 2014 - Reichental was named by Popular Mechanics as one of the 25 Makers Who Are Reinventing the American Dream
