= Gerrymandering (film) =

- Theatrical poster
- Directed by: Jeff Reichert
- Written by: Jeff Reichert
- Produced by: Chris Romano; Dan O'Meara
- Cinematography: Gary Keith Griffin
- Edited by: Sam Pollard
- Music by: David Wingo
- Distributed by: Green Film Company
- Release date: October 15, 2010
- Running time: 81 minutes
- Country: United States
- Language: English

Gerrymandering is a 2010 American documentary film written and directed by Jeff Reichert. The film explores the history and the ethical, moral and racial problems raised by redistricting, i.e., the drawing of boundaries of electoral districts in the United States.

Gerrymandering covers the history of the redistricting practice, how it is used and abused, how it benefits the two major political parties, Democrats and Republicans.

== Etymology ==
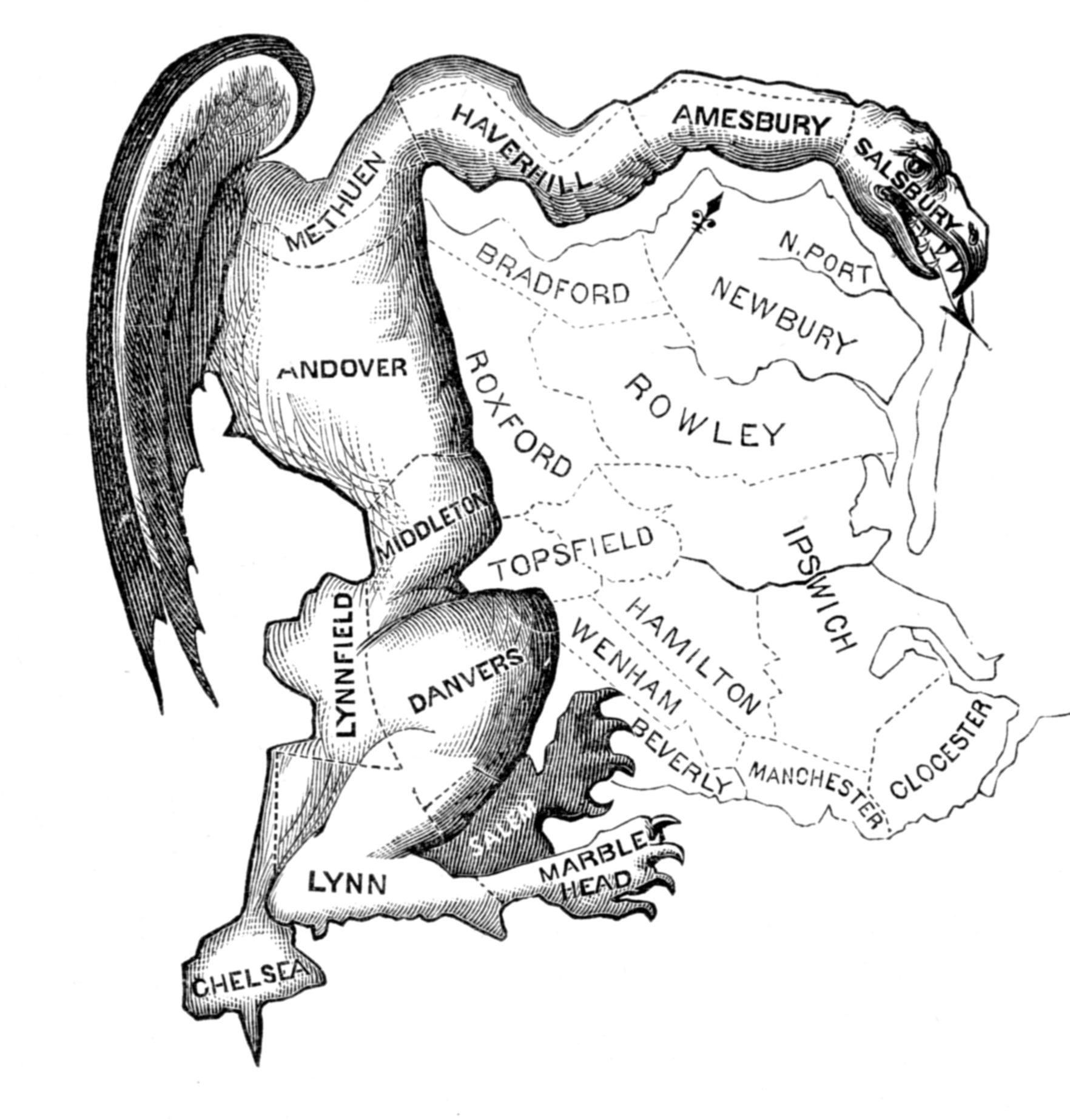
The original "Gerrymander" pictured in an 1812 cartoon. The word is a portmanteau of Massachusetts Governor Elbridge Gerry's name, with "salamander".

The etymology of the word gerrymandering dates back to a redrawing of Massachusetts' state Senate election districts in 1812. It was named after the governor of Massachusetts, Elbridge Gerry, who signed a bill redistricting the state to his own advantage. One district was described as having the shape of a salamander; hence the term gerrymandering.

== Content summary ==
Jeff Reichert uses the successful campaign for California’s Proposition 11, which was designed to take redistricting power away from the state legislature and give it to the Citizens Redistricting Commission, as a through-line for the film. The film also uses several historical examples of gerrymandering, including New York State Assemblyman Hakeem Jeffries's district being redrawn by the incumbent so that he could not wage an electoral challenge as he was no longer a resident.

The documentary also explores the events of the 2003 Texas redistricting, when Representative Tom DeLay and Gov. Rick Perry, both Republicans, sought to redraw the map of the state’s Congressional districts to favor Republicans. As they lacked the votes to stop the legislation, 52 Democrats from the House of Representatives fled to Oklahoma to prevent a quorum. However, when they returned, Mr. DeLay ultimately got the legislation needed to redraw the districts passed.

=== Appearances ===
Gerrymandering draws on the perspectives from different individuals, reporters, pundits and politicians including Arnold Schwarzenegger, Howard Dean, Bob Graham, Lani Guiner, Ed Rollins, John Fund, Gerald Hebert and Susan Lerner, and an array of lesser-known personalities.

== Reception ==
On Rotten Tomatoes, the film has a score of 40% based on reviews from 20 critics, with an average rating of 5.5 out of 10. On Metacritic, the film has a score of 49% based on reviews from 9 critics (2 positive, 7 mixed).

Owen Gleiberman of The A.V. Club gave Gerrymandering a C - and Entertainment Weekly gave the documentary a B+.
