= Formlabs =

American manufacturer of 3D printers

- Formlabs 3D Printers: Form Studio 1, Form 4, Form 4L, Fuse 1+ 30W, and Fuse X1
- Type: Private
- Industry: 3D printing/ Stereolithography/ Selective laser sintering
- Founded: September 2011
- Founder: Maxim Lobovsky, David Cranor, and Natan Linder
- Headquarters: Somerville, Massachusetts, United States
- Revenue: US$250 million (2025)
- Number of employees: 750 (2026)
- Website: formlabs.com

Formlabs is a 3D printing technology developer and manufacturer. The Somerville, Massachusetts-based company was founded in September 2011 by three MIT Media Lab students. The company develops and manufactures 3D printers, along with related software and consumables. It raised nearly $3 million in a Kickstarter campaign and created the Form 1, Form 1+, Form 2, Form Cell, Form 3, Form 3L, Form 4, Form 4L, Form Studio 1, and Form Auto stereolithography and Fuse 1, Fuse 1+, and Fuse X1 selective laser sintering 3D printers and accessories.

== History ==
Formlabs was founded by Maxim Lobovsky, Natan Linder, and David Cranor, who met as students at the MIT Media Lab while taking a class called "How to Make (almost) Anything". The founders also drew on their experience with MIT's Center for Bits and Atoms Fab lab program, as well as Lobovsky's experience with the Fab@Home project at Cornell University.

Formlabs was officially founded in September 2011 to develop the first desktop-sized, easy-to-use, and affordable stereolithography 3D printer. Formlabs received early seed funding from investors including Mitch Kapor, Joi Ito, and Eric Schmidt’s Innovation Endeavors.

In November 2012, Formlabs was sued by the industrial 3D printing giant 3D Systems that claimed rights to the stereolithography technology that the Form 1 uses. The lawsuit was dismissed in 2014, after the two parties settled.

In October 2013, Formlabs closed an additional $19 million Series A round of financing led by DFJ Growth, joined by Pitango Venture Capital, Innovation Endeavors, and returning angel investors.

In 2015, Formlabs opened their second office in Berlin, Germany. In August 2015, Michael Sorkin, former co-founder of iGo3D, joined Formlabs to serve as the managing director of their European headquarters.

In August 2016, Formlabs raised $35 million in series B funding led by Foundry Group.

In April 2018, Formlabs raised $30 million in series C funding led by Tyche Partners, with investors including the municipally owned Shenzhen Capital Group. The company said it would use the funding to expand its product portfolio and scale operations to meet increasing customer demand, particularly from Asia.

In August 2018, Formlabs raised $15 million from New Enterprise Associates, valuing the company at over $1B. As part of that fundraising round, Jeff Immelt was appointed to the company's board of directors.

In May 2021, Formlabs raised a $150 million Series E round from the Softbank Vision Fund 2, bringing the valuation to $2B.

According to market intelligence firm CONTEXT, Formlabs held the leading global market share in the professional price-class category in 2025, capturing 38% of total global hardware shipments.

== Products ==
=== Form 1 ===
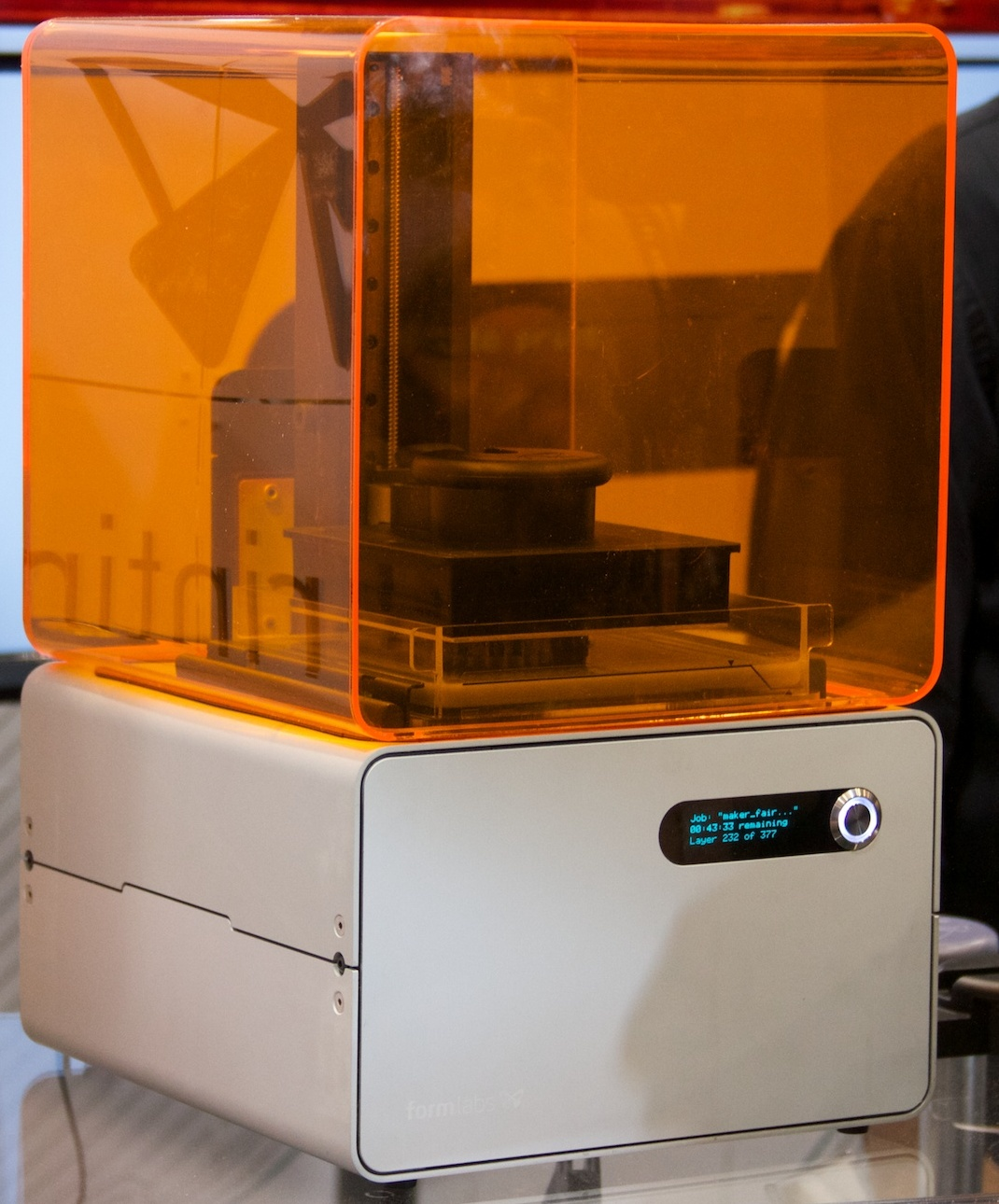
Form 1

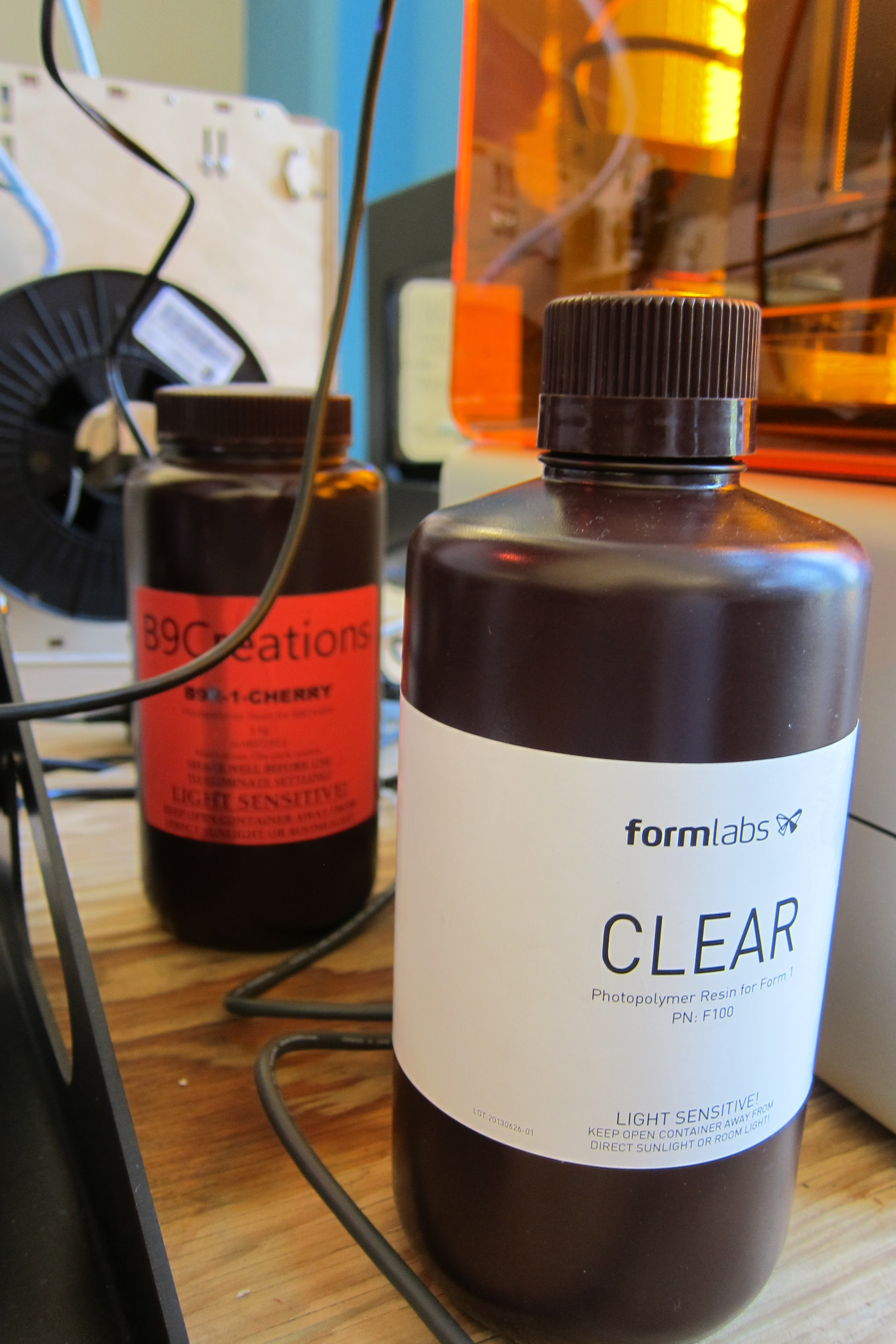
Photopolymer Resin for Form 1

In October 2012, Formlabs publicly announced its first product, the Form 1 3D printer, in a Kickstarter campaign that raised a record-breaking $2.95 million in funding making the Form 1 one of the most highly funded crowdfunding projects up until that time. Form 1 3D printers began shipping to backers in May 2013 after months of delayed production. The Form 1 used a 3D printing process known as stereolithography, wherein liquid resin is cured, or hardened, into a solid material by the application of laser light. Although previously available in larger, more expensive machines, the Form 1 offered stereolithography in a smaller, more affordable desktop-class device.

=== Form 1+ ===
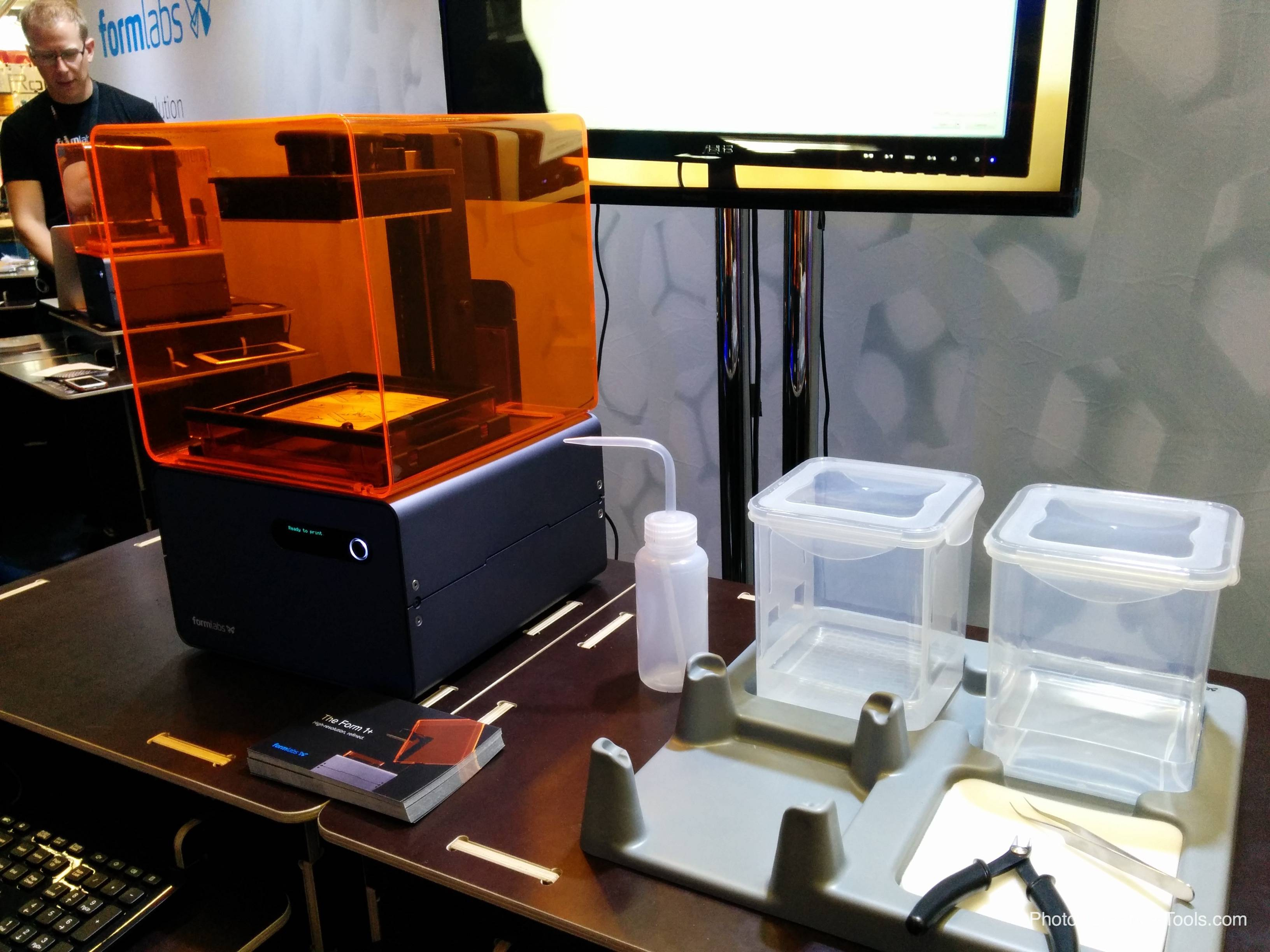
Form 1+

On June 10, 2014, Formlabs released the Form 1+ 3D Printer, which replaced the Form 1 in their product line. Improvements included speed, print quality, and reliability. The Form 1+ was officially sunsetted March 15, 2017.

=== Form 2 ===
On September 22, 2015, Formlabs announced the Form 2 printer, including a larger build volume and a wiper. It also switches to a cartridge resin system, instead of bottles that needed to be manually poured into the Form 1 & Form 1+. Third-party resins can be used with Open Mode. The Form 2 was named Best Resin Printer for 2019 by Tom's Guide in their annual rankings. The Form 2 is scheduled to be officially sunsetted in 2023.

=== Form Wash and Form Cure ===
On May 5, 2017, Formlabs announced the Form Wash and the Form Cure. Together with the Form 2, they complete the SLA engine. The Form Wash is a washing machine used to automatically clean liquid resin off of printed 3D models. The Form Cure is an ultraviolet postcuring system. After printing, the build platform on the Form 2 can be removed and installed on the Form Wash, which uses an impeller to agitate 3D printed parts in isopropyl alcohol. The Form Cure heats parts up to 80 degrees Celsius and uses thirteen 405 nanometer UV LEDs.

=== Fuse 1 ===
On June 5, 2017, Formlabs announced the Fuse 1, a selective laser sintering 3D printer. It has a much larger build volume than the Form line of printers, a removable build chamber, and uses nylon powder.

=== Form 3, Form 3B, Form 3L and Form 3BL ===
On April 2, 2019, Formlabs announced the 4th Generation of their SLA printers, the Form 3 and Form 3L, designed for use by artists, designers, and other professionals. The Form 3 offers a larger print area than the Form 2 as well as Low Force Stereolithography (LFS), a new SLA technology developed by Formlabs that promises smoother surface finish and more detailed prints. The Form 3L utilizes the same optics engine as the Form 3, including LFS, with five times the build volume. Additional improvements include an upgraded optics engine, modular components to simplify repair and integrated sensors to improve print success and usability. This earned it the title of Best Resin Printer of 2019 by The Mediahq.

On November 12, 2019, Formlabs launched the Form 3B, a variant of the Form 3 specially designed for the dental industry. Unlike the Form 3, the Form 3B is compatible with Formlabs' array of specialty dental materials. The only exception is Form 3 printers designated "Early 2019" which retain the dental material capabilities from its initial release.

In 2020, the company launched Form 3BL, which features the larger platform of the Form 3L, along with the material capabilities of the Form 3B.

In 2022 at CES, the company announced the Form 3+ and Form 3B+ which are updated versions of the Form 3/3B with improved LPU/Laser stability, better heating and monitoring of the build chamber, true light touch supports, and the new build platform 2, which uses a flexible stainless steel sheet held with magnets to a base in order to make removing the parts from the build plate faster and easier than the original build platform the first shipped with the Form 2.

=== Form Cell ===
On June 5, 2017, Formlabs announced the Form Cell, a cell of Form 2 3D printers, as well as a Form Wash and a robotic gantry system. It is completely automated and can be used as a 24-hour digital "factory".

=== PreForm ===
Formlabs provides a free software package called PreForm, designed to prepare 3D models for printing on the Form 1, Form 1+, Form 2, Form 3, and Fuse 1. Some of the features of PreForm include automatic model orientation and support structure generation.

=== Nasopharyngeal Swabs ===
As the COVID-19 pandemic took off in March 2020, Formlabs, working with, Northwell Health and the University of South Florida developed a 3D printed nasopharyngeal swab made from biocompatible resins. After receiving FDA Class I Exempt status, Formlabs quickly went into production; its printing facility in Ohio was initially able to produce 150,000 swabs daily, and the design was released so that hospitals with their own printers can make swabs. Northwell and the University of South Florida were each immediately able produce 1,500 swabs daily with printers they already had.

=== Fuse 1+ 30W ===
On July 13, 2022, Formlabs announced the Fuse 1+ 30W, an upgraded industrial SLS printer that was designed for faster throughput, utilizing a 30-watt laser for up to two times higher print speed compared to the previous model. The Fuse Series has since become the best-selling selective laser sintering 3D printers, that accounted for 55% of all SLS printers sold worldwide in 2025.

=== Form Auto ===
In January 2023 at CES, Formlabs announced the successor to its Form Cell program by introducing the Form Auto. The Form Auto automates the Form 3 printer and enables users to remotely open the cover, start prints, and clear parts off the build platform.

=== Form 4 and Form 4B ===
On April 17th, 2024, Formlabs announced its fourth generation printer the Form 4. This is the first Formlabs printer to use a LCD screen as opposed to lasers used in the first three generations of machines.

Formlabs also announced the Form 4B for the dentistry and medical industries. The Form 4B is utilizes their Low Force Display (LFD) technology that uses a custom LCD and 17 other optical components, a patent pending release texture, and a composite film tank to increase print speed without sacrificing quality or reliability.

=== Form 4L and Form 4BL ===
On October 17, 2024, Formlabs unveiled the Form 4L and Form 4BL, its latest large-format SLA printers. Similar to the Form 4, this model utilizes an LCD screen instead of lasers, enhancing printing speed and efficiency. The Form 4L also features a developer platform that allows users to customize materials and workflows for specific applications.

=== Fuse X1 ===
On June 9, 2026, Formlabs announced the Fuse X1, a large-format industrial SLS 3D printer with a 330 × 330 × 565 mm build volume, roughly 7.5x larger than the Fuse 1 generation printers. The system introduced Adaptive Thermal Control, a new thermal architecture utilizing 13 independent thermal zones, designed to maintain stable print conditions across the build chamber, alongside Print Intelligence, an AI-powered monitoring system designed to detect anomalies and selectively halt printing on defective parts.

=== Form Studio 1 ===
Form Studio 1

In October 2026, Formlabs introduced the Form Studio 1, a desktop masked stereolithography (MSLA) printer priced from US$699 and aimed at hobbyists, educators and small businesses. It uses a version of the company's Low Force Display (LFD) technology, has a build volume of 200 × 125 × 235 mm, and supports third-party resins through an Open Material Mode. Formlabs released a new, lower-cost line of Alpha resins alongside the printer. When used with Alpha resins and the optional VOC Extractor, the printer is certified UL GREENGUARD Gold for low chemical emissions; according to Formlabs, it is the first resin 3D printer to receive this certification. The printer received Editor's Choice awards from TechRadar, Tom's Hardware and PCMag.

== Documentary ==
Formlabs is featured in Print the Legend, a documentary that tells the stories of several leading companies in the desktop 3D printer industry. The film premiered at SXSW in March 2014, and was released internationally on Netflix on September 26, 2014.

== See also ==
- List of 3D printer manufacturers
