= MakerBot =

American manufacturer of 3D printers

MakerBot Industries, LLC
- Industry: 3D printing
- Founded: January 20, 2009; 17 years ago
- Founders: Bre Pettis; Adam Mayer; Zach "Hoeken" Smith
- Defunct: August 31, 2022
- Fate: Merged with Ultimaker
- Successor: Ultimaker
- Headquarters: New York City
- Key people: Nadav Goshen (CEO)
- Products: Replicator+ Replicator Mini+ Replicator Z18; Method
- Parent: Stratasys
- Website: www.makerbot.com

MakerBot Industries, LLC was an American desktop 3D printer manufacturer company headquartered in New York City. It was founded in January 2009 by Bre Pettis, Adam Mayer, and Zach "Hoeken" Smith to build on the early progress of the RepRap Project. It was acquired by Stratasys in June 2013. As of April 2016, MakerBot had sold over 100,000 desktop 3D printers worldwide. Between 2009 and 2019, the company released 7 generations of 3D printers, ending with the METHOD and METHOD X. It was at one point the leader of the desktop market with an important presence in the media, but its market share declined over the late 2010s. MakerBot also founded and operated Thingiverse, the largest online 3D printing community and file repository. In August 2022, the company completed a merger with its long-time competitor Ultimaker. The combined company is known as UltiMaker, but retains the MakerBot name for its Sketch line of education-focused 3D printers.

== History ==
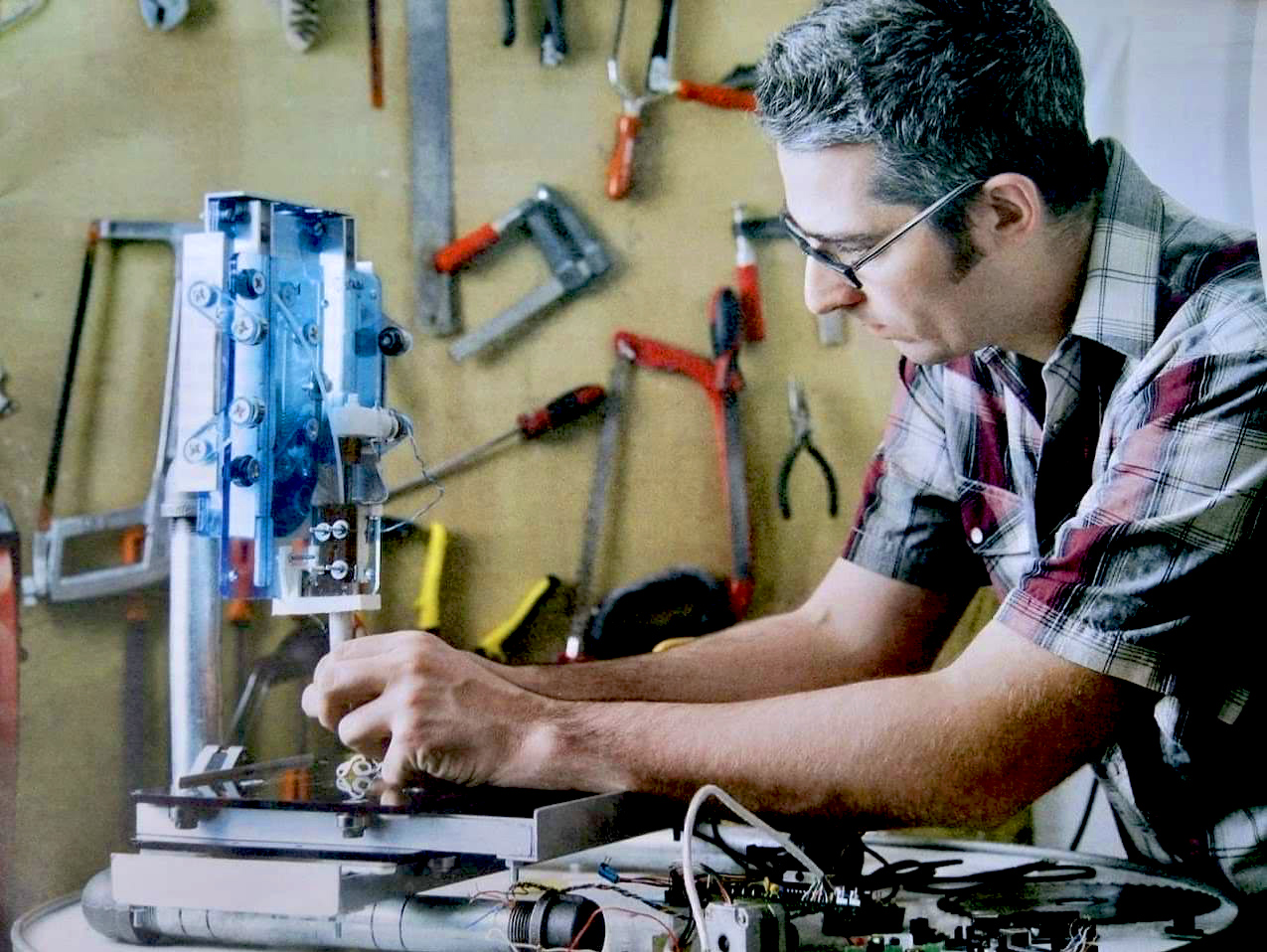
This is the first 3D printer Bre Pettis put together while an artist-in-residence at art group monochrom in Vienna, Austria in autumn 2007.

Smith was one of the founding members of the RepRap Research Foundation, a non-profit group created to help advance early research in the area of open-source 3D printers. Bre Pettis got inspired during an art residency in Vienna with monochrom in 2007, when he wanted to create a robot that could print shot glasses for the event Roboexotica and did research about the RepRap project at the Vienna hackerspace Metalab. Shot glasses remained a theme throughout the history of MakerBot.

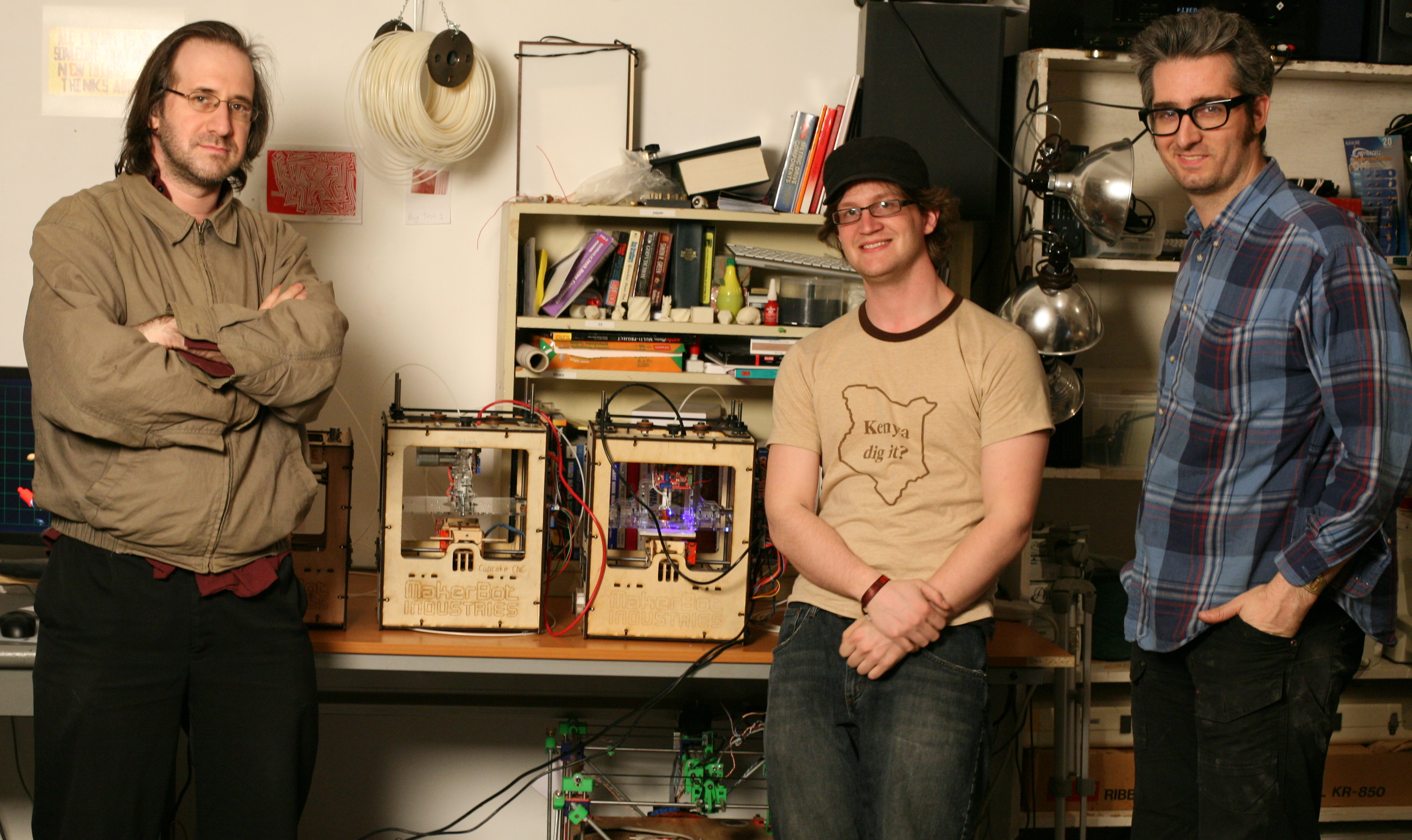
MakerBot founders (left to right) Adam Mayer, Zach Smith and Bre Pettis with the final MakerBot Cupcake prototypes.

The company started shipping kits in April 2009 and had sold approximately 3,500 units as of March 2011. Demand for the kits was so great in 2009 that the company solicited MakerBot owners to provide parts for future devices from their own MakerBots. Seed funding of $75,000 was provided by Jake Lodwick ($50,000) and Adrian Bowyer and his wife, Christine ($25,000).

In August 2011, venture capital firm The Foundry Group invested $10 million in the company and joined its board.

In April 2012, Zachary Smith was pushed out, involving disagreement on adherence to open-source principles, and likely also about integration with Stratasys. Private security led out 100 employees laid off around the same time.

On June 19, 2013, Stratasys Incorporated announced that it had acquired MakerBot in a stock deal worth $604 million, with $403 million in stock paid up front, based on the current share value of Stratasys. The deal provided that MakerBot would operate as a distinct brand and subsidiary of Stratasys, serving the consumer and desktop market segments. When acquired, Makerbot had sold 22,000 printers. Bre Pettis moved to a position at Stratasys and was replaced as CEO by Jennifer Lawton, who in 2015 was succeeded by Jonathan Jaglom, then in January 2017, Nadav Goshen.

In April 2015, it was reported that in an effort to integrate MakerBot's activities better with those of Stratasys, Jaglom laid off around 100 of 500 employees and closed the existing three MakerBot retail locations. Then, 80 other employees were laid off in October 2015.

In February 2017, MakerBot's newly minted CEO Nadav Goshen laid off more than 30% of the workforce and changed the position of the company from consumer focused to two verticals based; professional and the education sector. This lay off was coined the "Valentine's Day Massacre" as it happened the day after. Overnight MakerBot went from 400 employees to under 200 worldwide.

On August 31, 2022, the MakerBot division was merged with Ultimaker, with Stratasys keeping a minority share in the new UltiMaker company.

== Products ==
A MakerBot printing a cylindrical object

MakerBot's first products were sold as do it yourself kits, requiring only minor soldering, with an assembly process compared to assembling IKEA furniture. Current models are designed as closed-box products, with no assembly required.

MakerBot printers print with polylactic acid (PLA), acrylonitrile butadiene styrene (ABS), high-density polyethylene (HDPE), and polyvinyl alcohol (PVA).

=== Cupcake CNC ===
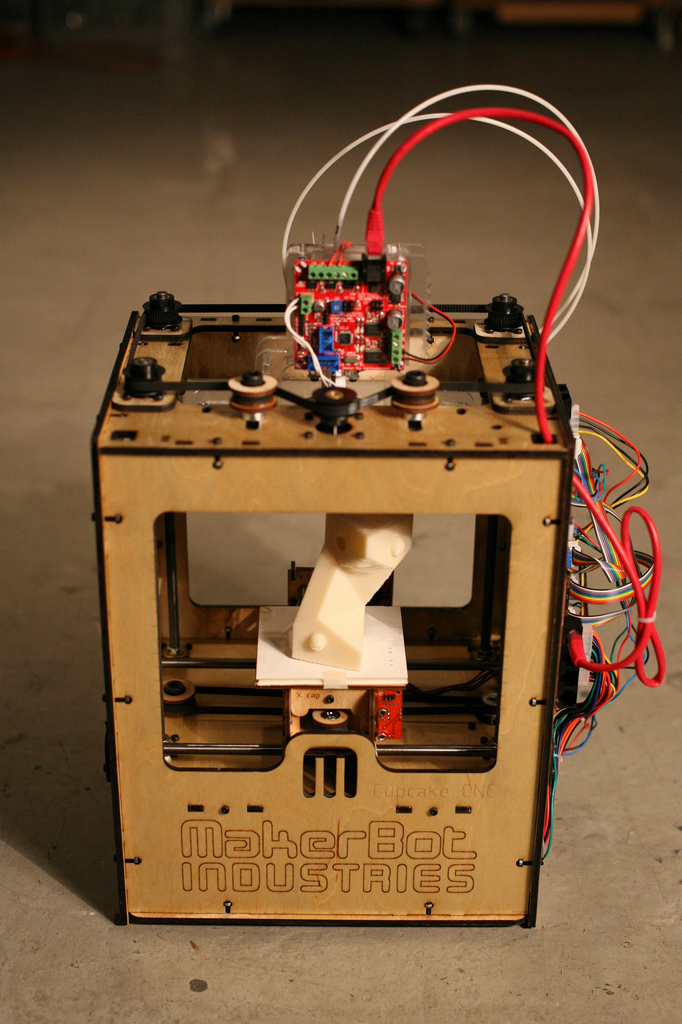
MakerBot Cupcake CNC; Forerunner to the Thing-O-Matic

The Cupcake CNC was introduced in April 2009 as a rapid prototyping machine. The source files needed to build the devices were put on Thingiverse, allowing anyone to make one from scratch. The Cupcake CNC featured a usable build volume of 100 mm × 100 mm × 130 mm (L/W/H) and has outside dimensions of 350 mm × 240 mm × 450 mm.

Because of the open source nature of the product, any suggestions for improvements came from users. During its primary production run (April 2009 to September 2010), the Cupcake CNC kit was updated several times to incorporate new upgrades into each successive version.

=== Thing-O-Matic ===
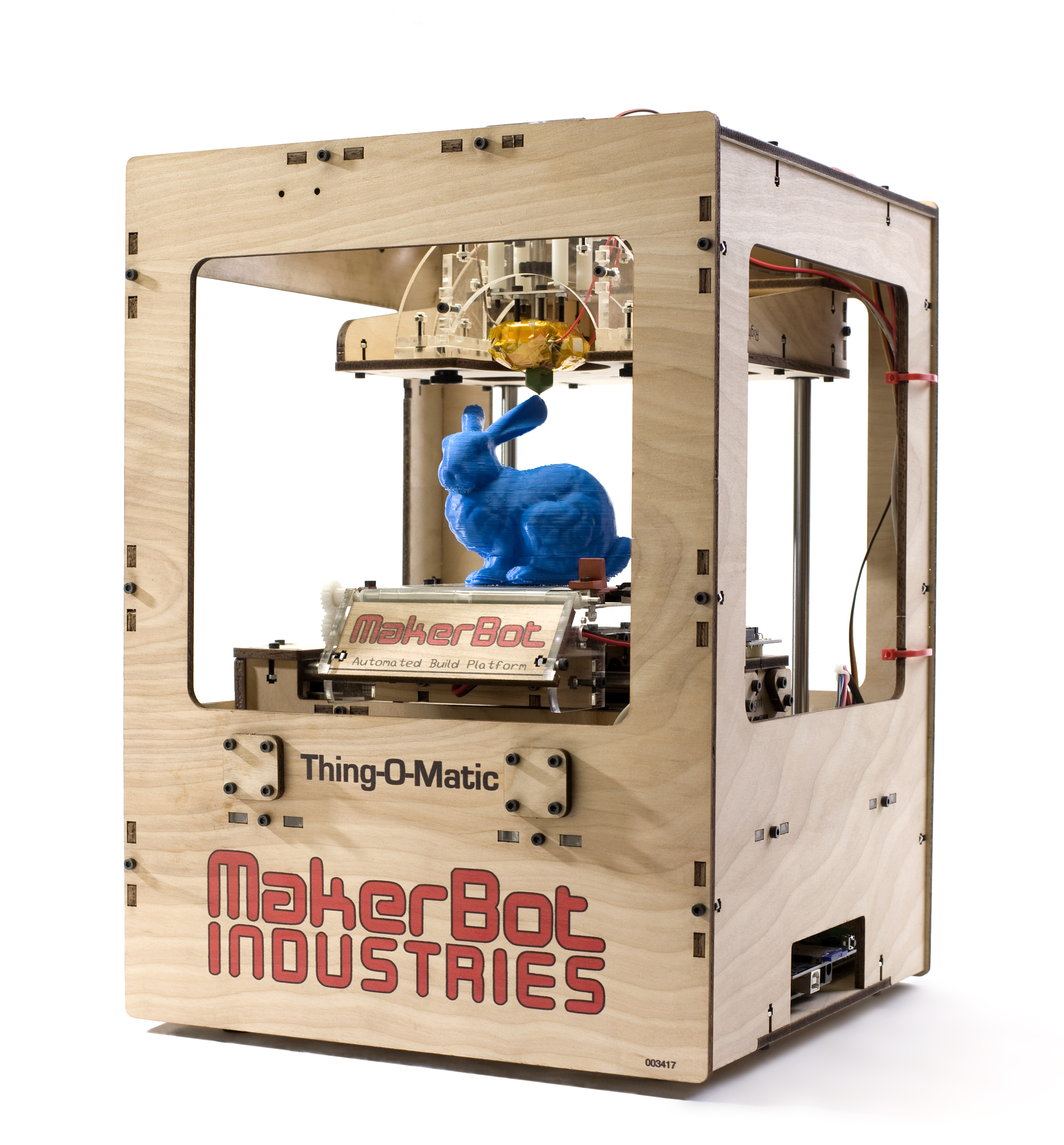
Fully Assembled Thing-O-Matic with MK6 Stepstruder Extrusion Head

Introduced in September 2010 at Maker Faire NYC, the Thing-O-Matic was MakerBot's second kit. It shipped with many of the aftermarket upgrades that had been built for Cupcake. The stock Thing-O-Matic included a heated, automated build platform, an MK5 plastruder, a redesigned z-stage and upgraded electronics. It featured a build volume of 100 mm × 100 mm × 100 mm (4" × 4" × 4") and outside dimensions of 300 mm × 300 mm × 410 mm (12" × 12" × 16" L/W/H). The device interfaces via USB or a Secure Digital (SD) card.

The Thing-O-Matic was discontinued in the spring of 2012. MakerBot agreed to support the Thing-o-Matic until their supply of parts was exhausted. Assembly instructions are available online through the MakerBot Wiki. The Thing-O-Matic is open-source hardware and is licensed under the GNU GPLv3. As such, the Thing-O-Matic can be heavily altered and improved by users. Some MakerBot operators developed upgrades to the platform that were later incorporated into factory kits. MakerBot has credited those early innovators in their documentation, some of the companies were inspired by MakerBot and created innovations in 3D printing like 3D printed dress.

=== Replicator ===
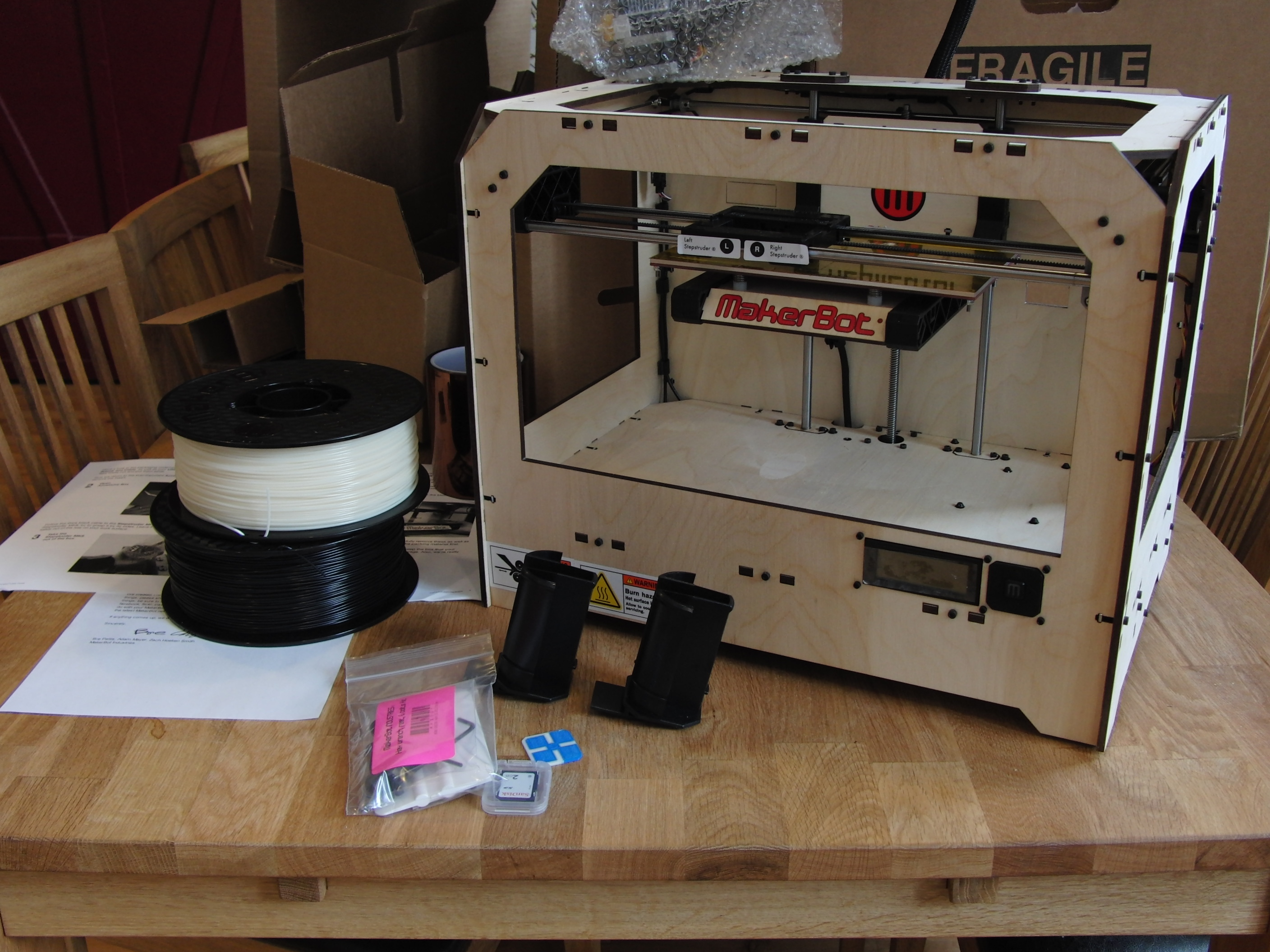
MakerBot Replicator

In January 2012 MakerBot introduced the Replicator. It offered more than double the build volume of the Thing-o-Matic at 22.5 cm × 14.5 cm × 15.0cm (8.9 in × 5.7 in × 5.9 in, L×W×H). Other features included a dual extruder allowing two-color builds, an LCD screen and a control pad. The Replicator was sold pre-assembled with no kit version available. It was the last open-source MakerBot printer.

=== Replicator 2 Desktop 3D Printer ===
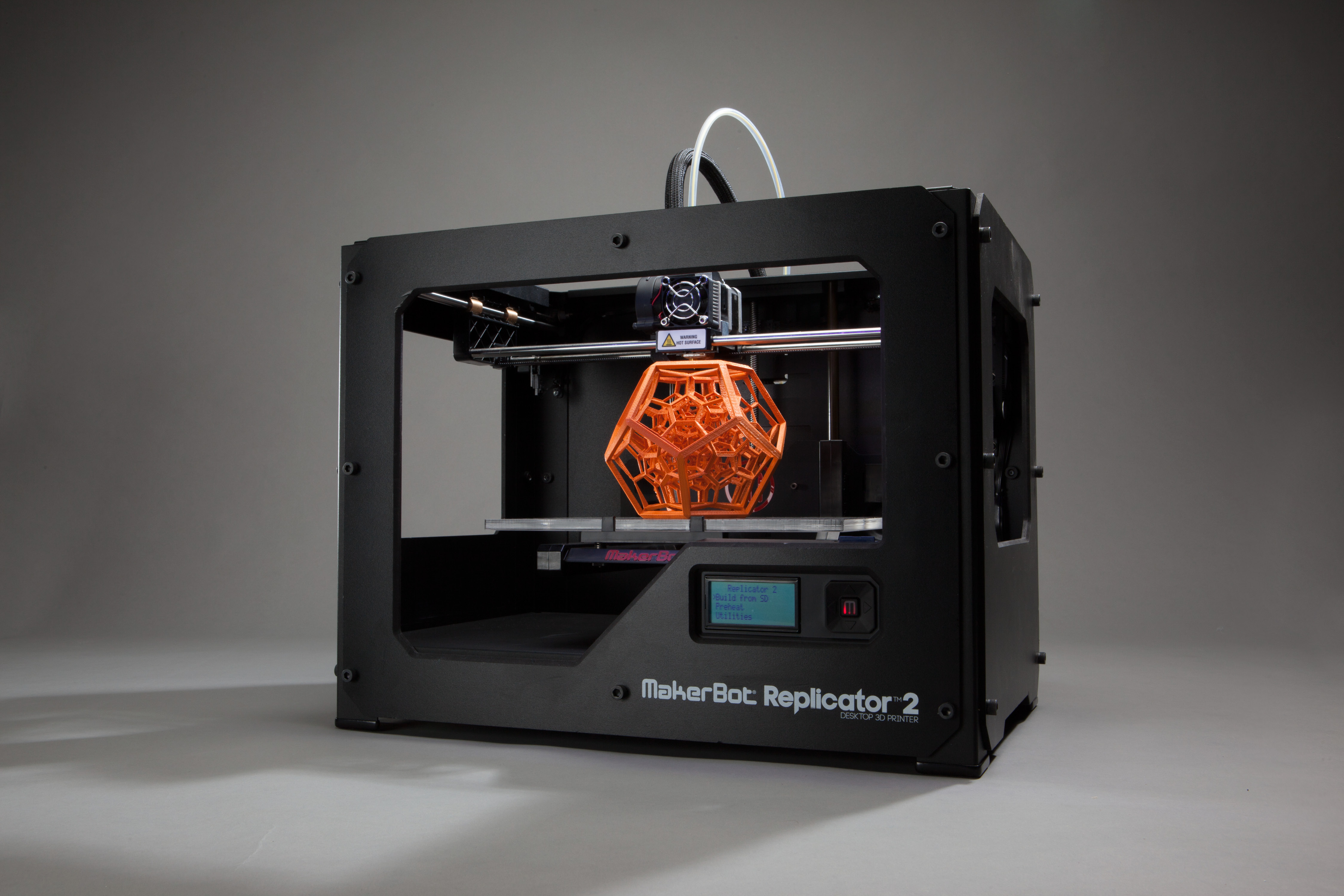
MakerBot Replicator 2 Desktop 3D Printer

In September 2012, MakerBot introduced the Replicator 2. This newest model again increased the build volume, this time to 28.5 cm × 15.3 cm × 15.5 cm (11.2 in × 6.0 in × 6.1 in, L×W×H) and can print at 100 μm per layer. The dual extruder was changed back to a single extruder head, while the upgraded electronics, LCD, and gamepad remained similar to the original Replicator. Unlike previous models, the Replicator 2 can print only using PLA plastic, which comes sold in sealed bags with desiccant to protect it from moisture. The Replicator 2 is sold only pre-assembled.

=== Replicator 2X Experimental 3D Printer ===
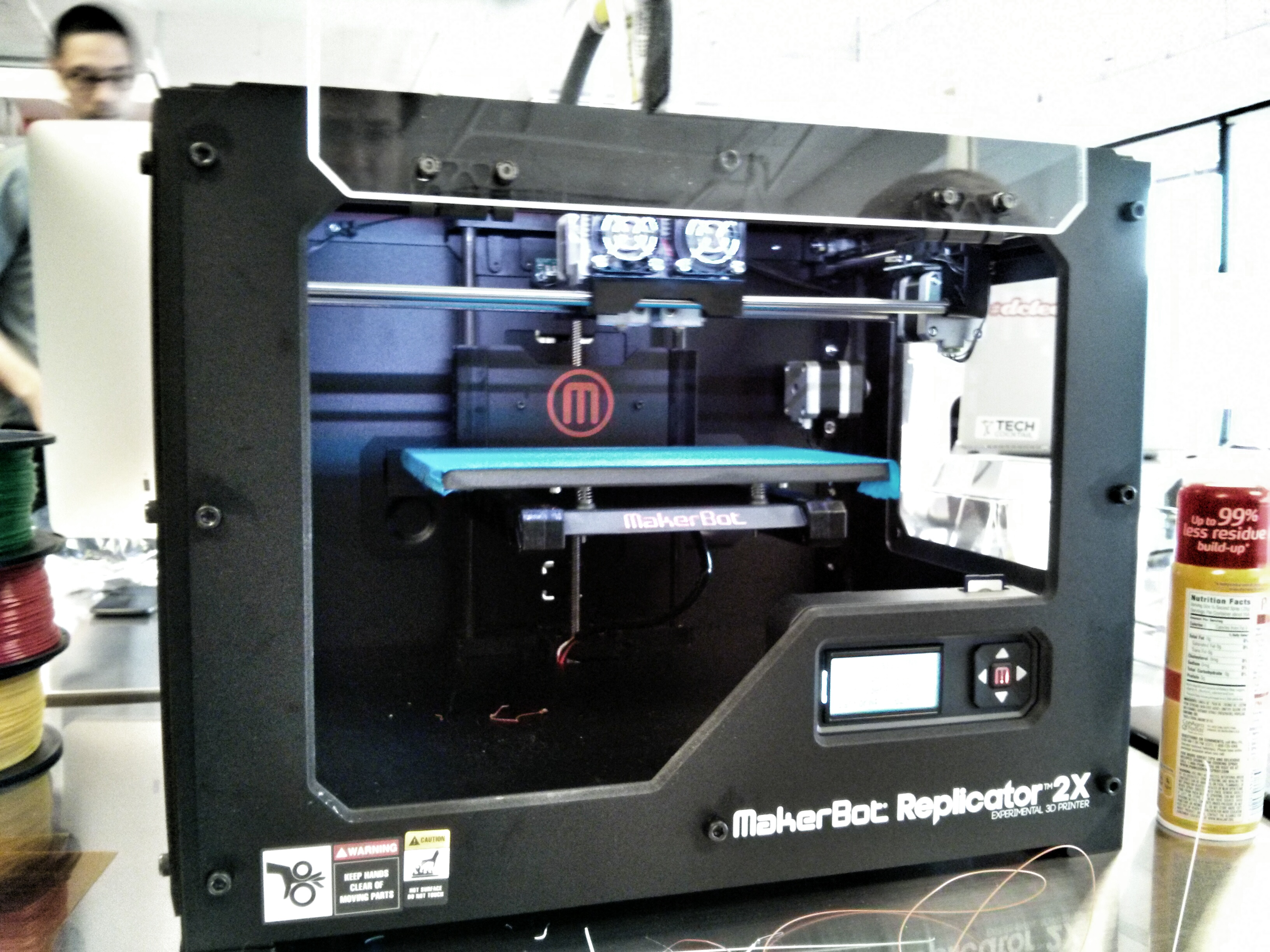
Replicator 2X Experimental 3D Printer

Alongside the Replicator 2, MakerBot also released the Replicator 2X. The 2X model was intended as an experimental version of the 2 that includes a completely enclosed build area, redesigned dual-extruders, and a heated aluminum build platform – all of which enable printing with ABS plastic and dual-material printing.

=== Digitizer Desktop 3D Scanner ===
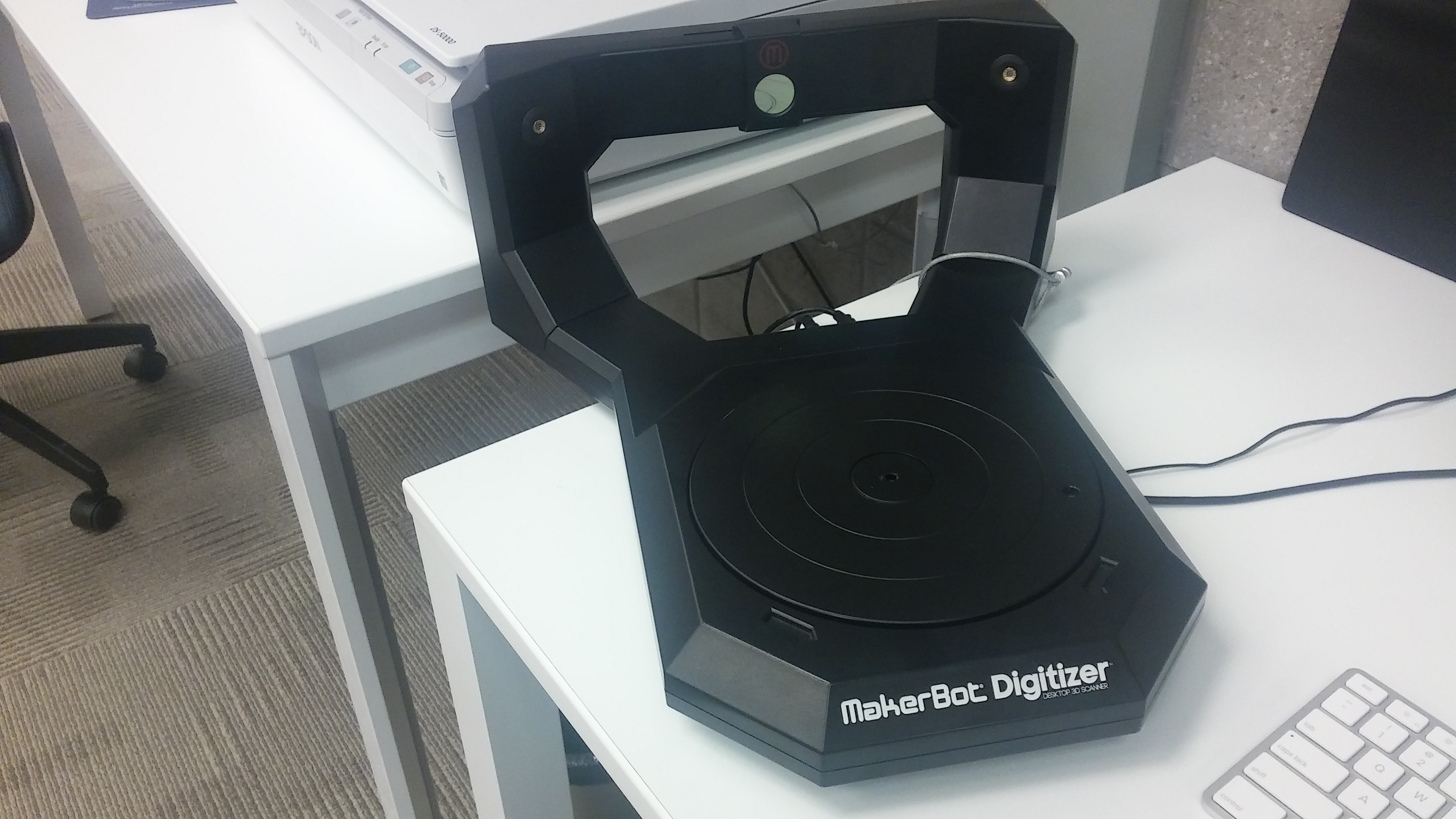
MakerBot Digitizer

In August 2013, MakerBot released the Digitizer, a 3D scanner. The product was designed to allow MakerBot users to scan physical objects and turn them into digital, 3D printable models. The accompanying software allowed models to be edited, printed immediately, or uploaded to Thingiverse.

=== 5th Generation Replicator Desktop 3D Printer ===
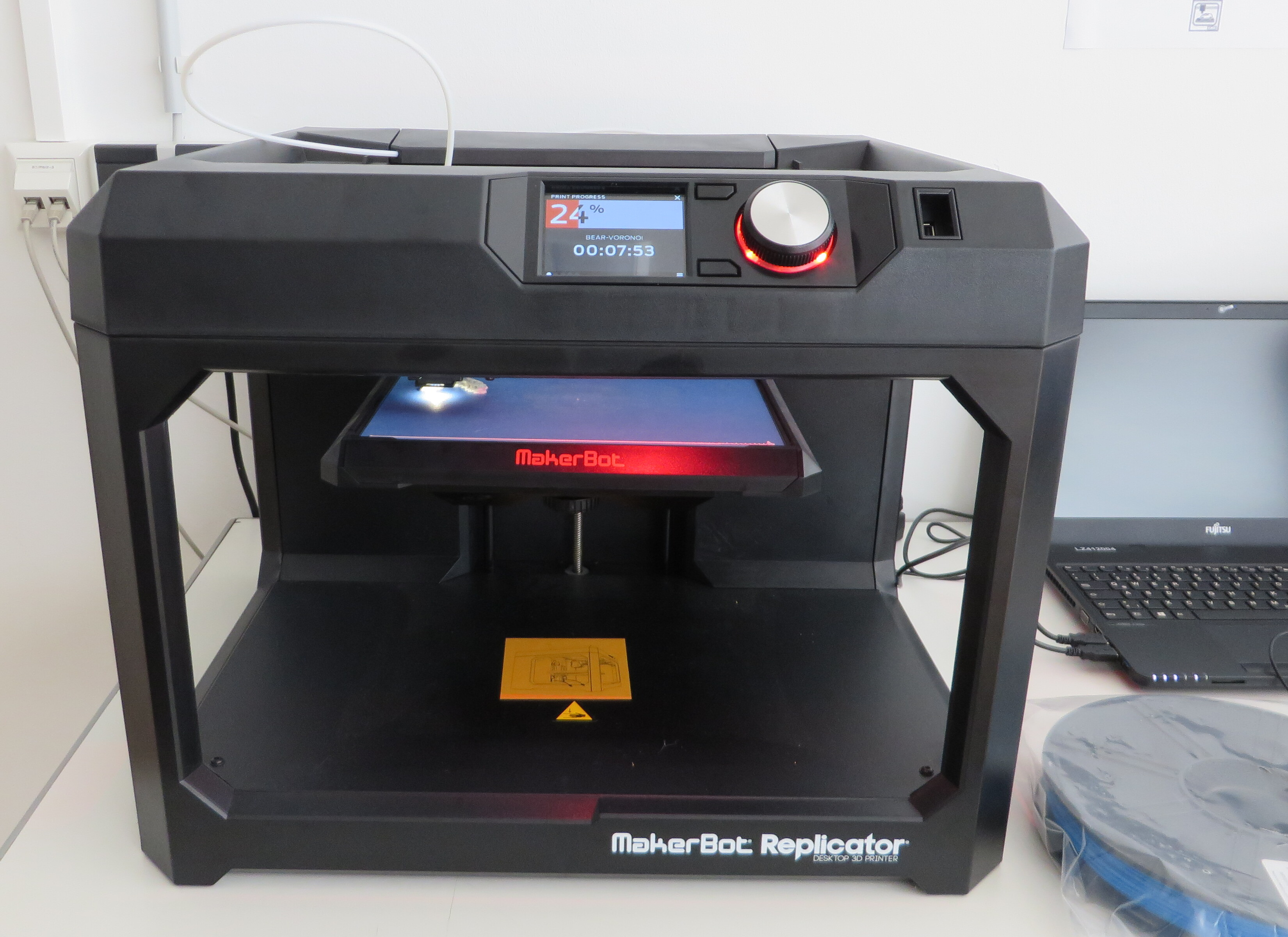
5th Generation Replicator Desktop 3D Printer

In January 2014, MakerBot released its Replicator Desktop 3D Printer with a build volume of 25.2 cm × 19.9 cm × 15.0 cm (9.9" × 7.8" × 5.9" L/W/H). This Fifth Generation Replicator features WiFi enabled software that connects the printer to MakerBot desktop and mobile apps.

=== Replicator Mini Compact 3D Printer ===
Also in January 2014, MakerBot released the Replicator Mini with a build volume of 10.0 cm × 10.0 cm × 12.5 cm (3.9" × 3.9" × 4.9" L/W/H), layer resolution of 200 μm, and a positioning precision of 11 μm on the x and y-axis and 2.5 μm in the z-axis.

=== Replicator Z18 3D Printer ===
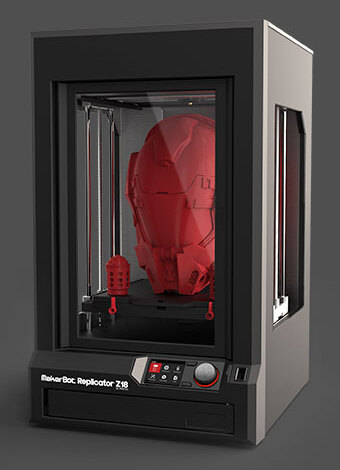
Replicator Z18

Released alongside the Replicator Mini and 5th Generation Replicator, the Z18 offers a build volume of 30.0 cm × 30.5 cm × 47.5 cm (11" × 12" × 18" L/H/W), totaling over 2,000 cubic inches.

=== Replicator+ 3D Printer ===
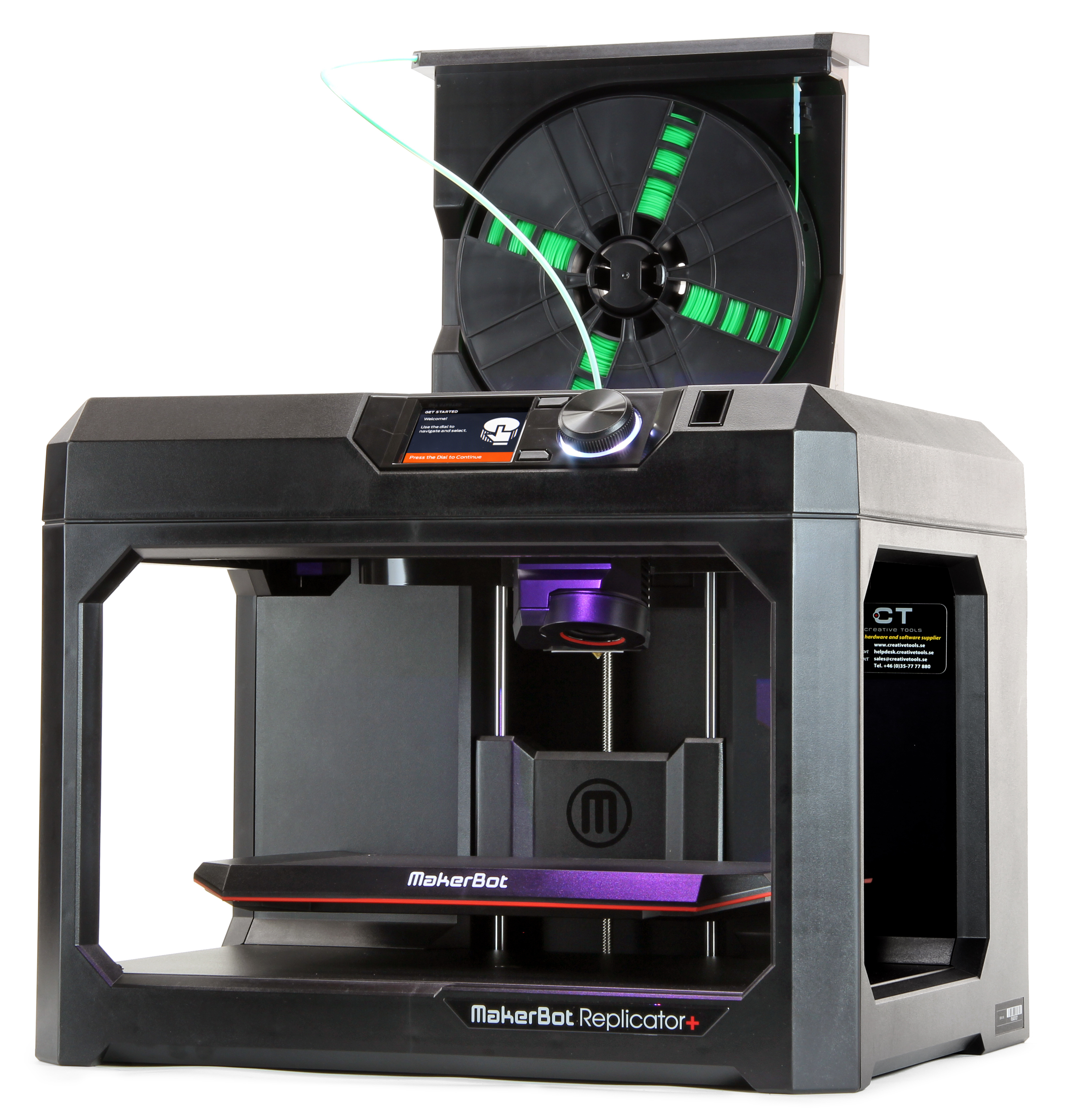
Replicator+ 3D Printer

The MakerBot Replicator+ was introduced in September 2016 as the successor to the Replicator 5th Generation from 2014. It retained the same general design concept but was significantly refined to address reliability and performance issues of its predecessor. The Replicator+ offered faster and quieter operation, improved hardware and motion system components, and a noticeably larger build volume of about 29.5 cm × 19.5 cm × 16.5 cm (around 25% bigger than the 5th Generation’s roughly 252 × 199 × 150 mm). Overall, it was positioned as a more robust and reliable upgrade with better print consistency and usability. Biggs, John (2014-01-10). "Battle of the MakerBots: The New Replicator Versus the 5th Generation". ZDNet. ZDNet.

=== METHOD and METHOD X 3D Printer ===
In December 2018, MakerBot introduced the METHOD 3D Printer as a bridge between desktop accessibility features and industrial 3D printing technologies. This new 3D Printer incorporated 15 Stratasys patents (MakerBot's parent company) and 15 new patents from MakerBot. The new 3D Printer has a Circulated Heated Chamber (60 °C) Dual extruders, uses soluble PVA supports and has a network of 21 sensors monitoring all aspects of 3D Printing process. The Method has as spring steel build plate allowing for easy removal of 3D prints. The Method has dry-sealed humidity and temperature monitored material bays and was launched with the capability of printing in PLA, Tough™ and PET-G. An ultra rigid metal frame construction reduces flexing during printing, allowing precision layer resolution of 20 to 400 micrometre and dimensional accuracy of ± 0.2mm. Connectivity is WiFi, Ethernet USB cable and USB drive.

The build volume of the new Method with dual extrusion is 19 cm × 19 cm × 19.6 cm (L×W×H)

This new platform allowed Makerbot to follow with the release of the METHOD X in August 2019, which includes a heated build chamber (100 °C) capable of printing with real ABS material, using SR-30 support material and with more 3D Printing materials in development.

=== MakerBot Innovation Center ===
Envisioned as a solution for major clients, the MakerBot Innovation Center incorporates hardware (optimized suite of 3D Printers), SAAS workflow software, training services, and enterprise support. The first Innovation Center was established in February 2014 at SUNY New Paltz. Customers are largely universities such as University of Maryland, Florida Polytechnic, UMass Amherst, and Xavier University. Many Innovation Centers increase their surrounding community's access to 3D printing.

== Manufacturing ==
Until mid 2016, manufacturing was performed in its own facilities in New York, then it was contracted to Jabil Circuit. The New York manufacturing personnel were laid off, while development, logistics, and repair operations remain in New York.

== Services ==
Prior to the merge with Ultimaker, MakerBot hosted the online community Thingiverse, where users can upload 3D printable files, document designs, and collaborate 3D printing projects and on open source hardware. The site is a collaborative repository for design files used in 3D printing, laser cutting and other DIY manufacturing processes.

== Media coverage ==
MakerBot was featured on The Colbert Report in August 2011. MakerBot artist in residence Jonathan Monaghan sent a bust of Stephen Colbert, printed on a MakerBot 3D printer, into the stratosphere attached to a helium filled weather balloon.

Netflix published in September 2014 the documentary Print the Legend about Makerbot history.

== Controversies ==
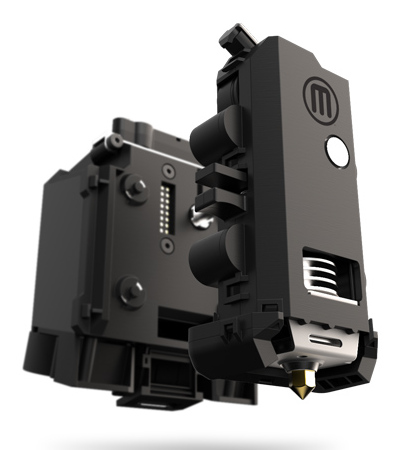
MakerBot Z18 'smart extruder'

Due to its detachment from the open source community, the departure of its founders, reliability problems with its 'smart extruder' and questionable user clauses on the Thingiverse site, there were several controversies related to the Makerbot.

The Fifth generation was equipped with an interchangeable extruder with some self-diagnostics capabilities. It was new in the market and supposed to help printer maintenance, but very short extruder lifespan problems were common, requiring frequent replacement at high cost. This led to a class action lawsuit which was dismissed. Ultimately, Makerbot replaced the failing extruder with a new version.

Around September 2012 the company stated that for their new Replicator 2 they "will not share the way the physical machine is designed or our GUI". This departure from the previous open-source hardware model was criticized by part of the community, including co-founder (and now former employee) Zachary Smith. The fifth generation of printers (new Replicator, Mini and Z18) are significantly more closed than previous models. With these models, MakerBot transitioned from open source hardware controllers, extruders, and firmware to proprietary versions of the above. They also changed print file formats from the S3G format used by earlier printers to the new .makerbot format.

In 2014, the company faced significant criticism when it filed patent applications for designs that some claimed had been invented by members of its community and published to Thingiverse, such as the quick release extruder. Community members accused MakerBot of asserting ownership over their designs when those designs had been contributed with the understanding that they would remain open source. Then-CEO Bre Pettis released a statement dismissing these critics, citing patents that had been filed for unique inventions prior to any community-created designs, namely that the patent for the quick release extruder was originally filed in 2012 while the open source design was first published to Thingiverse in 2013.

== See also ==
- 3D printing
- List of 3D printer manufacturers
- RepRap project
- DEFCAD
- Fused deposition modeling
