= List of 3D printing software =

This is a list of 3D printing software.

Software	Developer	Operating system
3D Slash	3D Slash	Web application, Windows, macOS, Linux
3D Systems	3D Systems	Windows
3YourMind	3YourMind	Web application
AstroPrint	3DaGoGo Inc.	Web application
Bambu Studio	Bambu Lab	Windows, macOS, Linux
Blender	Blender Foundation	Windows, macOS, Linux
Cura	Ultimaker	Windows, macOS, Linux
DesignSpark Mechanical	Ansys, Inc., RS Group plc	Windows
FreeCAD	FreeCAD Community	Windows, macOS, Linux
Fusion	Autodesk	Windows, macOS, Web application, Android, iOS
Klipper	Klipper Community	Windows, macOS, Linux
Marlin	Marlin Community	Windows, macOS, Linux
Markforged	Markforged	Web application
Materialise NV	Materialise NV	Windows
MatterControl	MatterHackers	Windows
MeshLab	ISTI - CNR	Windows, macOS, Linux
OctoPrint	OctoPrint community	Windows, macOS, Linux
Onshape	PTC	Windows, macOS, Linux
OpenSCAD	OpenSCAD Community	Windows, macOS, Linux, FreeBSD, NetBSD, OpenBSD
OrcaSlicer	OrcaSlicer community	Windows, macOS, Linux
PreForm	Formlabs	Windows, macOS
Polar Cloud	Polar3D	Web application
PrintStash	xiao-villamor	Windows, macOS, Linux
PrusaSlicer	Prusa Research	Windows, macOS, Linux
Repetier-Host	Hot-World GmbH & Co. KG	Windows, macOS, Linux
SelfCAD	SelfCAD	Web application
Siemens NX	Siemens Digital Industries Software	Windows, macOS, Unix
Slic3r	Alessandro Ranellucci	Windows, macOS, Linux
Solid Edge	Siemens Digital Industries Software	Windows
SolidWorks	Dassault Systèmes	Windows
Tinkercad	Autodesk	Web application

- Proprietary
- Open source

== See also ==
- 3D printing - or additive manufacturing
- 3D scanning - replicating objects to 3D models to potentially 3D print
- Comparison of computer-aided design software
- 3D Manufacturing Format - open source file format standard developed and published by the 3MF Consortium
- PLaSM - open source scripting language for solid modeling
- 3D printing processes
- Thingiverse - open CAD repository/library for 3D printers, laser cutters, milling machines
- MyMiniFactory - 3D printing marketplace
- CAD library - 3D repository to download 3D models
- Fused filament fabrication - 3D printing process that uses a continuous filament of a thermoplastic material
- Qlone - 3D scanning app based on photogrammetry for creation of 3D models on mobile devices that can be 3D printed
- Metal injection molding
- EnvisionTEC - 3D printing hardware company
- Desktop Metal - company focused on 3D metal printing
- Slicer (3D printing) - toolpath generation software used in 3D printing
- List of computer-aided manufacturing software - for CNC machining
- List of 3D printer manufacturers
