= Cults (3D printing marketplace) =

3D printing marketplace and social network

- Website type: 3D printing marketplace
- Available in: English, French, Spanish, Deutsch, Russian, Chinese, Portuguese
- Founded: 2014
- Headquarters: Brive-la-Gaillarde
- Country of origin: France
- Founders: Hugo Fromont, Pierre Ayroles, Sunny Ripert
- Industry: 3D Printing, e-Commerce, Marketplace
- Website: cults3d.com
- Commercial: Yes
- Registration: Free
- Users: 12 000 000
- Launched: 2014
- Current status: Active

Cults is a 3D printing marketplace allowing designers, makers and other users to share free and paid models meant for 3D printing. It is also a social network where 3D printing enthusiasts can interact. In May 2025, the Cults community had nearly 12 million members, including nearly 200,000 designers and 2.3 million 3D models to download for 3D printing, laser cutting, CNC machining, papercraft, sewing patterns and PCBs.

Cults is aimed at all owners of 3D printers, CNC machines, laser cutters, and sewing machines who want access to premium, original digital creations to make themselves.

== History ==
Cults was founded in 2014 and is the first fully independent 3D printing marketplace.

In 2015, La Poste established a partnership with Cults and 3D Slash to develop impression3d.laposte.fr, a digital manufacturing service, allowing users to have objects printed and shipped to them on demand.

In 2016, Boulanger partners with Cults to develop Happy 3D, an open source platform dedicated to spare parts printing, in an effort to promote sustainable consumption.

== Name ==
The name Cults is an anacyclic word: when read backwards, it becomes St-Luc, patron saint of artists and sculptors. Additionally, the first three letters are STL, referring to the common stereolithography file format used by creators.

== See also ==
- 3D Printing Marketplace
- 3D printing
- 3D modeling
- Thingiverse
- Sketchfab
- Pinshape
- Materialise NV
- 3DLT
- Sculpteo
- Shapeways
- Threeding
- STL (file format)
- CGTrader
