= Pinshape =

Pinshape Inc.
- Formation: 2013; 12 years ago
- Founders: Lucas Matheson; Nick Schwinghamer; Andre Yanes
- Headquarters: Vancouver, British Columbia, Canada
- Services: 3D printing
- Website: pinshape.com

Pinshape Inc. is an online 3D printing community and marketplace with headquarters in Vancouver, British Columbia, Canada. It allows designers to share and sell their 3D printable designs. People with 3D printers can print those designs on their own printers.

== Overview ==
Pinshape was founded in 2013 by Lucas Matheson (CEO), Nick Schwinghamer (COO), and Andre Yanes (CTO). The site is a marketplace that showcases the digital work of 3D designers from all over the world. 3D print designers set their own prices for their design files, and also choose which license to offer their work under (Creative Commons or other).

Designs found on Pinshape can be directly downloaded if allowed by the designer, or they can be sent directly to a user's 3D printer using a direct browser-to-printer functionality. The browser-to-printer functionality removes the need to access the design source file and increases intellectual property security. Designers have the option of charging per print. Pinshape also allows its users to review designs and share the settings they used to print the files.

On March 30, 2016, the company announced its closure on its website: "The value of a 3D Printing marketplace is obvious in the long term, but for many, the path to monetization isn’t so clear. Part of our challenge was demonstrating a financial path forward."

Pinshape was acquired by Formlabs on May 3, 2016.

== 500 Global ==
Pinshape was selected for and attended the 500 Global (then 500 Startups) accelerator program in Mountain View, California as part of Batch 9, from April to July 2014. They were one of 30 companies selected from over 1,400 applicants to participate in the 4-month program.

== See also ==
- 3D Printing Marketplace
- 3D printing
- 3D modeling
- Thingiverse
- Sketchfab
- Cults
- Materialise NV
- 3DLT
- Sculpteo
- Shapeways
- Threeding
- STL (file format)
