= Printrbot =

American manufacturer of 3D printers

- Industry: 3D Printing
- Founded: 2011
- Founder: Brook Drumm
- Headquarters: Lincoln, California
- Website: printrbot.com

Printrbot is a 3D printer company created by Brook Drumm in 2011 and originally funded through Kickstarter. Printrbot printers use fused deposition modelling to manufacture 3-dimensional artifacts.

Printrbot's older designs including STLs are publicly available on GitHub.

== History ==
Printbot was founded by Brook Drumm in 2011 as Printbot, Inc.

Printrbot was the most funded technology project on Kickstarter when in December 2011, it raised US $830,827 through crowdfunding.

It closed operations in 2018 due to "low sales". It resurfaced again in 2020 as Printbot, LLC with Drumm once again as the CEO. However, as of December 2024 both Brook Drumm's personal website as well as printrbot.com are unavailable.

== Design and operation ==
Models are printed by depositing molten ABS or PLA plastic filament onto a hotbed from a print head which moves about the X and Z axes using stepper-motors, guided by metal threaded rods. The models to be printed are sent to the printer via a USB interface using specialized software such Repetier-Host (recommended by the manufacturer for use with newer printers) or Pronterface (recommended by the manufacturer at the time of Printrbot's initial launch).

=== Assembly ===
Printrbot has sold both fully assembled printers and build it yourself kits.

=== Filament ===
Printrbot models can print in ABS or PLA plastic filament which can be purchased from the official store or other sources. Printrbot models can be outfitted to accept 1.75 mm or 3.0 mm diameter filament. The filament is available in many colors. Although the Printrbot hotend and extruder system is advertised to work with PLA and ABS, it is also capable of extruding many other filaments. Printrbot sells "exotic" filaments such as Nylon, Ninjaflex, and Carbon fiber-reinforced PLA.

=== Hardware ===
All Printrbots are controlled by nearly similar open source circuit boards called Printrboards. The Printrboard has experienced several revisions and is identified by revision letters printed on them. For example, the most recent official revision of the Printrboard is Rev F, which can be purchased separately. The Printrboard can have many types of firmware loaded on it, but they are sold with an open-source firmware from the RepRap Project called Marlin. The printer is controlled through a USB interface.

Printrbot had an exclusive arrangement with Carl Ubis to use his Ubis Hot Ends in the Printrbot printers. A hot end is the part of the 3D printer that melts the filament and extrude it out of the nozzle to make your 3D print.

=== Software ===
Printrbot does not come with any software and the official getting started guide recommends using the freeware program Cura 1.5 with Pronterface to interface with the printer. A freeware program with 3D visualization called Repetier-Host is also used.

Cura is one software option for driving your Printrbot printer.

The Printrbot interprets G-code produced by a computer program called a slicer, turning commands into outputs for four stepper motors, heated bed and extruder outputs, and a cooling fan port.

Import 3D models (oftentimes STL files from Thingiverse or user created in apps like Autodesk Fusion). The user can rotate and scale the 3D model to fit the virtual print bed. They can then convert the 3D model into G-Code that the printrbot can understand.

The user can then print directly to their printrbot via USB or use a SD or miniSD card to transfer the print file.

== Printrbot in education ==
At the beginning of 2015, Printrbot announced two new initiatives to help schools gain access to 3D printers. The first program, named Printrbot Ambassadors, let registered schools borrow an assembled Printrbot Simple Metal with an Alu handle, spool holder and 1 kg of filament for a month for cost of shipping. After the month, the school had the option to buy the 3D printer at a reduced price or to send it back to Printrbot. The second program allowed schools to buy a Printrbot Simple Metal at a discount. Users needed to buy through a school and agree to be featured on a public listing. As of August 2, 2015, approximately 126 schools and universities were using Printrbot 3D printers.

== Models ==
=== Current models ===
Model	Model No.	Years available	Build volume		Filament
Model	Model No.	Years available	(mm)	(inch)	Filament
Printrbot Pro Limited Release	2020	2020	300 × 300 × 300	12 × 12 × 12	Any filament. Yes, any.
Printrbot Metal Plus	1412	2014–2018	250 × 250 × 250	10 × 10 × 10	ABS + PLA
Printrbot Play	1505	2015–2018	100 × 100 × 130	4 × 4 × 5	PLA
Printrbot CNC Beta 01		2014–2018	360 × 460 × 100	14 × 18 × 4	N/A
Printrbot Crawlbot		2015–2018	1,219 × 2,438 × 51	48 × 96 × 2	N/A
Printbot Go Large V2		2015-2018	330 × 610	13 × 24	ABS

=== Printrbot Pro ===
On May 14, 2015, Brook Drumm introduced the Printrbot Pro, a large-scale 3D printer. According to Drumm, the Printrbot Pro has a build volume of about 2 cubic feet, a heated bed, a dual-extruder setup with the ability to print multiple materials. The printer also offers an optional enclosed build chamber, an LCD panel, a SD card slot as well as LED lighting.

=== Printrbot Play and Play v2 ===
Model	Model No.	Image	Color offered	Year available	Build volume (mm)	Build volume (inch)	Min. Layer Height (micron)	Filament	Connectivity	Comments
Play	1505		Red, Black, White, Gray							
Play V2			White	2018	150 mm × 200 mm × 150 mm	5.9 in × 7.9 in × 5.9 in	50		USB-Tethering	Limited offers (<10 sold?)

=== Discontinued models ===
Model	Model No.	Image	Years available	Build volume		Filament	Comments
Model	Model No.	Image	Years available	(mm)	(inch)	Filament	Comments
Printrbot Smalls				100 × 100 × 150	4 × 4 × 6	PLA and PLA-composites	Metal Kit build. Extra use of 3D-printed parts in printer pieces...
Printrbot Simple Metal	1403		2014–2018	150 × 150 × 150	6 × 6 × 6	1.75 mm PLA, (Heated build platform for ABS use available)	
Printrbot Simple 2014	1405			100 × 100 × 100	4 × 4 × 4	1.75 mm PLA only	Largest model available
Printrbot Jr.				150 × 150 × 150	6 × 6 × 6	PLA only	Can be folded for storage.
Printrbot LC	1302 or 1308			150 × 150 × 150	6 × 6 × 6	ABS + PLA	
Printrbot GO			2013	200 × 180 × 150	8 × 7 × 6	PLA + ABS	Suitcase form factor, designed in collaboration with Ben Heck
Printrbot Plus				200 × 200 × 200	8 × 8 × 8	ABS	
Printrbot (original)				150 × 150 × 150	6 × 6 × 6	ABS	

== See also ==
- List of 3D printer manufacturers
