= Artec 3D =

Manufacturer of 3D scanning products

- Type: Private
- Industry: 3D scanning software and hardware
- Headquarters: Luxembourg
- Website: www.artec3d.com

Artec 3D is a developer and manufacturer of 3D scanning hardware and software. The company is headquartered in Luxembourg, with offices also in the United States (Santa Clara, California), China (Shanghai), Japan (Tokyo), Portugal (Lisbon) and Montenegro (Bar). Artec 3D's products and services are used in various industries, including engineering, healthcare, media and design, entertainment, education, fashion and historic preservation. In 2013, Artec 3D launched an automated full-body 3D scanning system, Shapify.me, that creates 3D portraits called "Shapies."

In January 2026, the Russian government declared Artec 3D an "undesirable organization": the company supplied 3D scanners to Ukraine to preserve their cultural heritage and document war crimes and incidents committed during the Russo-Ukrainian war, such as Malaysia Airlines Flight 17.

== Technology ==
3D scanners capture the geometry of an object and produce a three-dimensional digital model. Artec's 3D scanners are structured light scanners. They operate by projecting light in a pattern, usually in the form of multiple parallel beams, onto an object. By projecting a grid pattern on the object, the scanners are able to capture the deformation or distortion from multiple angles and then calculate the distance to specific points on the object using triangulation. The three-dimensional coordinates obtained are used to digitally reconstruction the real-world object. Light scanners can utilize either blue light or white light, which is what Artec's scanners use. The choice of light does not impact the processes or concepts behind the technology.

== Hardware ==
Eva

Eva is a handheld, color scanner, released in 2012, that can capture and process up to two million points per second. The scanner was designed for the capture of medium to large objects. The device has a scan area of 214 x 148 mm at its closest range and 536 x 371 mm at its furthest, a 3D resolution of up to 0.5 mm and a 3D point accuracy of 0.1 mm. Eva can operate at distances between 0.4 m and 1 m from the object, capturing up to 16 frames per second. Data can be exported as OBJ, PLY, WRL, STL, AOP, ASCII, PTX, E57, or XYZRGB files types. Eva does not require a warm up period and can be used immediately upon powering on.

Spider

Spider is a 3D handheld, color scanner, released in 2013, designed to capture smaller, complex objects with high resolution and accuracy. The device has a 3D resolution of as high as 0.1 mm and a point accuracy up to 0.05mm. Spider does not require markers or manual alignment during post-processing. It requires a 30-minute warm up period to achieve maximum accuracy. Resulting scans can be exported into a number of file formats, including OBJ and STL.

Space Spider

Space Spider is a 3D handheld, color scanner released in 2015. The Space Spider utilizes a blue LED light source and has a 3D resolution of up to 0.1 mm with 0.05 mm accuracy. It operates at distances between 170 mm and 350 mm from an object. The device was initially developed for use on the International Space Station and incorporates an advanced temperature control system to prevent overheating, a common issue for electronics in space. The scanner requires a warm up period of three minutes to achieve maximum accuracy and is able to guarantee this precision even after several hours of constant use.

Ray

Ray is a portable 3D laser scanner designed for capturing large objects and areas in detail, from up to 110 meters away. Released in 2018, Ray produces scans with submillimeter accuracy (up to 0.7 mm) and minimum of noise, requiring significantly reduced post-processing times. Artec Ray is suitable for reverse engineering and inspection applications, as well as historical preservation, both indoors and outdoors. This compact (under 5 kg) LIDAR solution is mobile, with the internal battery giving users up to 4 hours of onsite scanning. Color is provided via two fully integrated 5 megapixel cameras. Scans are made directly in Artec Studio software, which offers a full range of post-processing tools. Scans can also be exported to Geomagic Design X for additional processing options. It's also possible to control Ray from a distance via an iPhone or iPad with the Artec Remote app (Wifi). Remote allows the user to make previews, select one or multiple scan areas, scan, and save the data directly to an SD card, as well as change scan settings and check battery and scanner status.

Shapify Booth

The Shapify Booth is an automatic 3D full body scanning booth unveiled in 2014, that contains four of Artec's handheld scanners and a stationary platform. The 3D scanners rotate around a person at 360 degrees to capture 700 surfaces in 12 seconds. The data captured is then automatically turned into a watertight, full-color 3D printable model in approximately five minutes. Shapify Booths can be bought or leased by businesses worldwide.

Broadway 3D

Broadway is the facial recognition biometric system developed by Artec under the Artec ID brand. The device is equipped with a 3D vision system and differentiates nuanced geometry with accuracy of up to fractions of a millimeter. It requires less than one second for facial recognition and has a registration time of two seconds. Broadway 3D provides a working distance range of 0.8 m to 1.6 m and can recognize up to 60 people per minute. The technology was utilized by the International Airport of Sochi to enhance security leading up to the 2014 Winter Olympics.

Leo

Leo is an ergonomic, handheld 3D color scanner with automatic, onboard processing, released in 2018. The Leo features a touch screen panel so users can watch in real-time as a 3D replica of the scanned object comes to life. By rotating and zooming the model, the user can see if any areas were missed, thus allowing full coverage in one scan. With a working distance of 0.35 – 1.2 m, Leo is a professional, high-speed scanner, designed for capturing everything from small parts all the way up to large areas such as crime scenes and heavy machinery. It has an angular field of view of 38.5 × 23° and a 160,000 cm3 volume capture zone. Data acquisition speed is up to 3 million points/second. No need for target markers, and Leo can operate effectively in broad daylight or complete darkness, and everything in between. Fully mobile and entirely wireless, no cables needed. SSD memory cards make possible unlimited captures. Built on the NVIDIA® Jetson™ platform, with a TX1 Quad-core ARM® Cortex-A57 MPCore CPU, NVIDIA Maxwell™ 1 TFLOPS GPU with 256 NVIDIA® CUDA® Cores; a built-in 9 DoF inertial system, with accelerometer, gyro and compass, so Leo always understands its physical position and surroundings.

Micro

Micro is an automated desktop 3D scanner designed for creating digital replicas of very small objects. Released in 2019, Micro's twin color cameras are synchronized with its dual-axis rotation system for scanning objects up to 90mm x 60mm x 60mm in size. Utilizing blue light technology, Micro has a 3D accuracy of up to 10 microns, and exports into popular file formats including STL, OBJ, and PTX. To prepare for scanning, objects are simply mounted upon Micro's scanning platform, the user chooses from a range of preselected scanning paths, or chooses their own, and then scanning can begin. A popular choice for quality inspection and reverse engineering of very small objects, Micro can also be used for dentistry and jewelry, and more.

== Software ==
Artec Studio

Artec Studio is a software program for 3D scanning and post-processing. Data is captured and split into several "scans," which are then processed and fused into a 3D model. Artec Studio includes a fully automatic post-processing mode called "Autopilot," which prompts users through questions related to the characteristics of the object being scanned and provides the option to be guided through the post-processing pipeline. The Autopilot mode will automatically align scans in a global coordinate system, determine which algorithms to use for post-processing, clean captured data and remove base surfaces. Upon completion, scan data can be directly exported to 3D Systems Geomagic Design X and SOLIDWORKS for further CAD processing.

Artec ScanApp

Artec ScanApp is a Mac OS X (supports El Capitan & Yosemite) application that allows data to be captured from an Artec Eva 3D Scanner to a Macintosh computer. Data collected with ScanApp can be processed within the software, or exported to a Windows PC for further processing with Artec Studio 11.

Artec Scanning SDK

Artec Scanning SDK is a Software Development Kit (SDK) that allows for individuals or companies to tailor existing or develop new software applications to work with Artec's handheld 3D scanners.

== Industries & Applications ==
Artec 3D's handheld scanners and software have been utilized across various industries. Examples of notable industry-specific applications include:

Engineering & Manufacturing, to create 3D digital models of:

- Water pipes by UK water and wastewater provider, Thames Water, in order to assess their condition and prioritize maintenance;
- The flooring of automobiles for the creation of customized floor mats by Nika Holding, a company that makes custom automobile accessories;
- Ships and parts for the Dutch Royal Navy, for conducting precise repairs and creating reverse-engineered parts.

Healthcare, to create:

- Protective helmets for infants with Positional Plagiocephaly by The London Orthotic Consultancy;
- Customized prosthetics and orthotics;
- Pre- and post-surgery facial masks for patients undergoing aesthetic, plastic and reconstructive operations.

Science & Education, to assist in global research and digitally preserve:

- Fossil remains of a 1.8 million-year-old crocodile, elephant and giant tortoise at the Turkana Basin in northern Kenya by the Turkana Basin Institute and Louise Leakey;
- 55 models of endangered and extinct birds including the eastern imperial eagle, white-tailed eagle and boreal owl with 3D printing marketplace, Threeding;
- 500 cultural heritage sites (including the Rani ki vav stepwell in India and the Washington Monument) and the British Museum’s Assyrian Relief collection, in collaboration with international non-profit organization, CyArk;
- Collections of historical and religious artifacts from the Historical Museum of Stara Zagora, Regional Historical Museums of Varna and Pernik, and the National Museum of Military History (Bulgaria) in collaboration with Threeding;
- Fossil skeletons of the Homo naledi species in the Dinaledi Chamber of the Rising Star cave system near Johannesburg, Africa, by the University of the Witwatersrand;
- Cow, deer, fox, bobcat and human skulls to create an interactive skull museum at St. Cloud University’s Visualization Lab in Minnesota, allowing students and faculty to examine objects otherwise too fragile to hold;
- Historical artifacts by 11th and 12th grade students at Mid-Pacific Institute as part of its Museum Studies coursework.

Art & Design, to digitally capture:

- United States President Barack Obama for the creation of the first 3D printed presidential bust;
- A sculpted head of a dinosaur for the movie Jurassic World, which allowed it to be rescaled as needed for the film;
- Stephen Colbert's head, which was cloned for the Wonderful Pistachio commercial that aired during the 2016 Super Bowl;
- Television host Larry King, former president and chairman of Marvel Comics, Stan Lee, and American singer, songwriter and actress, Christina Milian, for the creation of miniature figurines by CoKreeate.
