= AstroPrint =

American 3D printing marketplace

- Type: Private
- Industry: 3D Printing
- Founded: 2013
- Founders: Drew Taylor, Daniel Arroyo, Joshua White
- Headquarters: San Diego, California
- Products: AstroBox Gateway (open source), AstroBox Touch, AstroPrint Desktop, AstroPrint Mobile, Toy Maker
- Brands: 3DaGoGo, AstroPrint
- Services: Software for 3D Printing
- Website: astroprint.com

AstroPrint is a cloud platform and application marketplace designed for consumer 3D printing by 3DaGoGo, Inc., a private San Diego–based technology corporation.

AstroPrint develops software that manages desktop 3D printers from web-enabled devices.

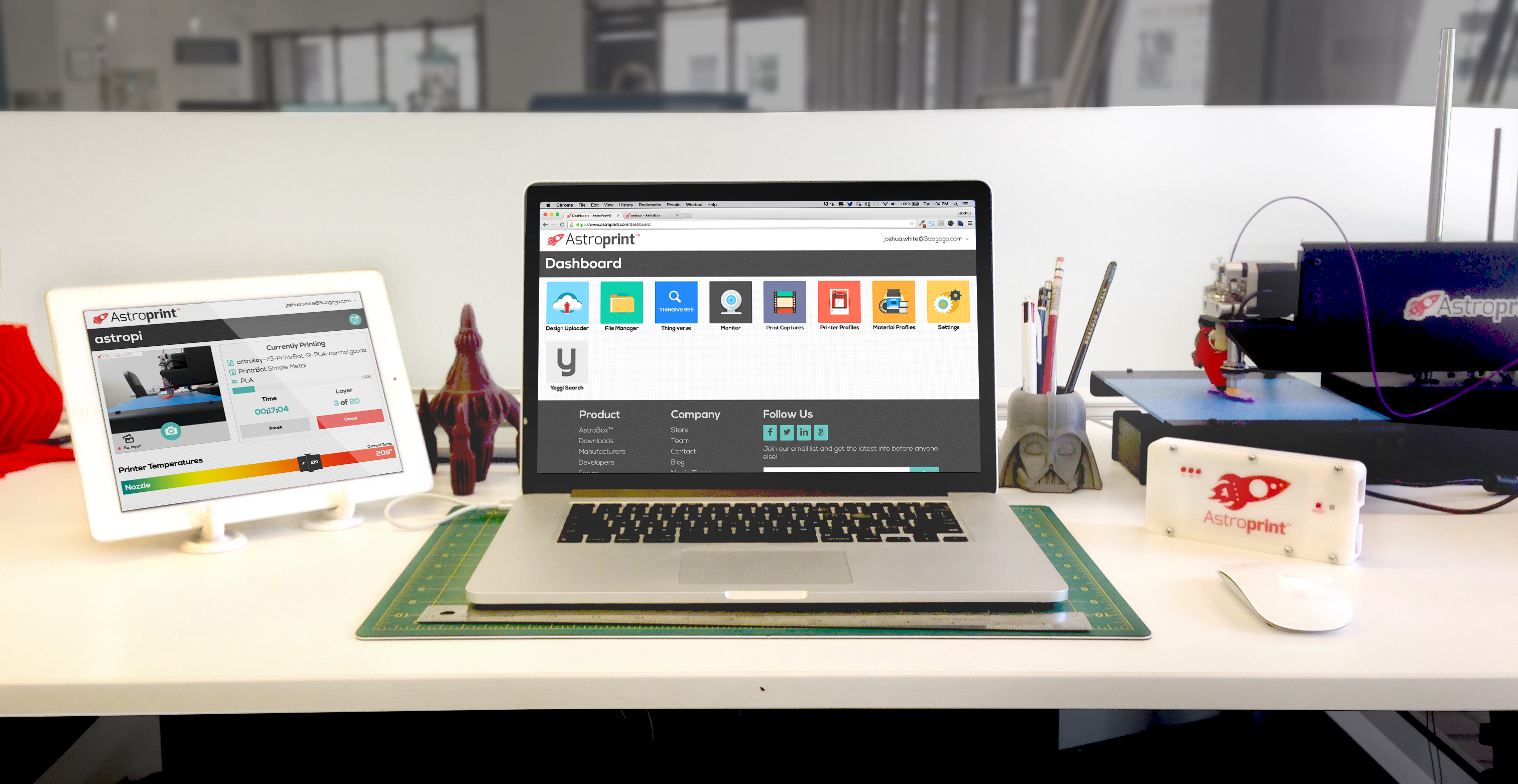
AstroPrint displayed on a variety of web-enabled devices

== History ==
In May 2014, while part of the Betaspring seed accelerator, AstroPrint was successfully funded through the crowdfunding platform Kickstarter. Subsequently, AstroPrint attended and graduated from the 500 Startups seed accelerator in Mountain View, CA. AstroPrint's investors included Dave McClure, Will Bunker, Dave Hodson (Co-Founder of MessageCast Inc.) and Christine Tsai.

On January 5, 2016, AstroPrint unveiled a joint project with Marvell at CES. The project involved the designing of a consumer-friendly 3D printer containing embedded software by AstroPrint using the Kinoma platform.

In May 2017, AstroPrint successfully funded the development of the AstroBox Touch. Along with the AstroBox Touch, AstroPrint released cross-platform desktop and mobile apps alongside a public API designed to enhance the 3D printing experience on its platform. Toy Maker, A mobile app that allowed children to 3D print toys at home, was released in November 2017. Toy Maker helped to feature the content delivery capabilities of the AstroPrint platform.

=== Media coverage ===
On May 18, 2015, AstroPrint received the Editors Choice award from Maker Faire & Make Magazine. Tech Cocktail named AstroPrint one of "The Top 5 Technologies VCs Will Fund in 2015".

In July 2015, AstroPrint received coverage by the San Diego Business Journal for enabling Dr. Peter Manning at the National Institutes of Health to print 3-dimensional models of a two-year-old boy's heart. The models, which helped to fix the network of coronary vessels that caused the boy's health problems, were allegedly made possible due to AstroPrint's simplicity.

In May 2017, AstroPrint received widespread media coverage for its second crowdfunding campaign.

== Technical specifications ==
AstroPrint takes a user's uploaded STL file, performs technical manipulations, and exports the generated g-code to the user's online account. The software then allows users to access, download, modify, and print their models wirelessly via their 3D printer. AstroPrint is built with a multitude of 3D printing technologies, including Cura, Repetier-Host, Slic3r, and OctoPrint. AstroPrint is compatible with many consumer 3D printers and devices, including the Raspberry Pi, and provides an API that allows third-parties to extend its capabilities.

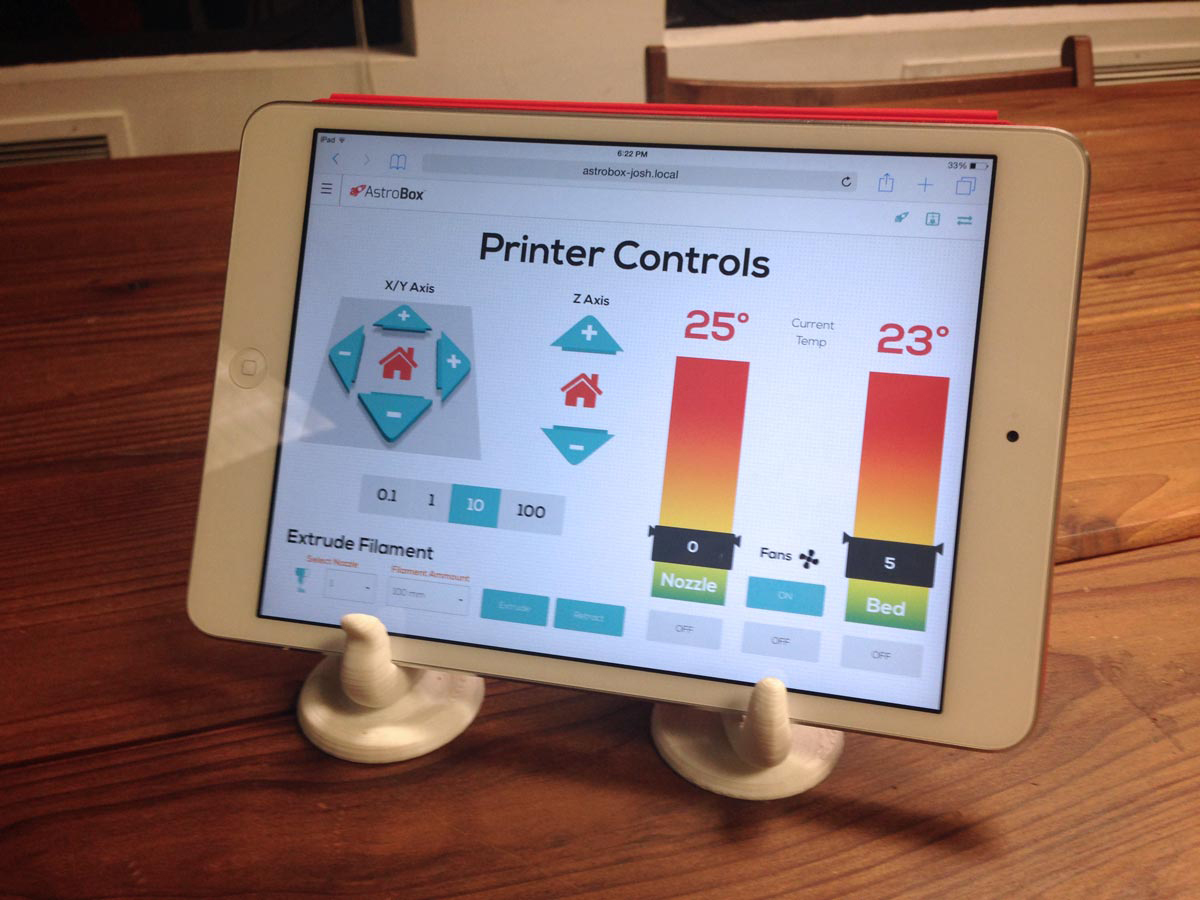
AstroPrint interface on a tablet while monitoring printer temperatures

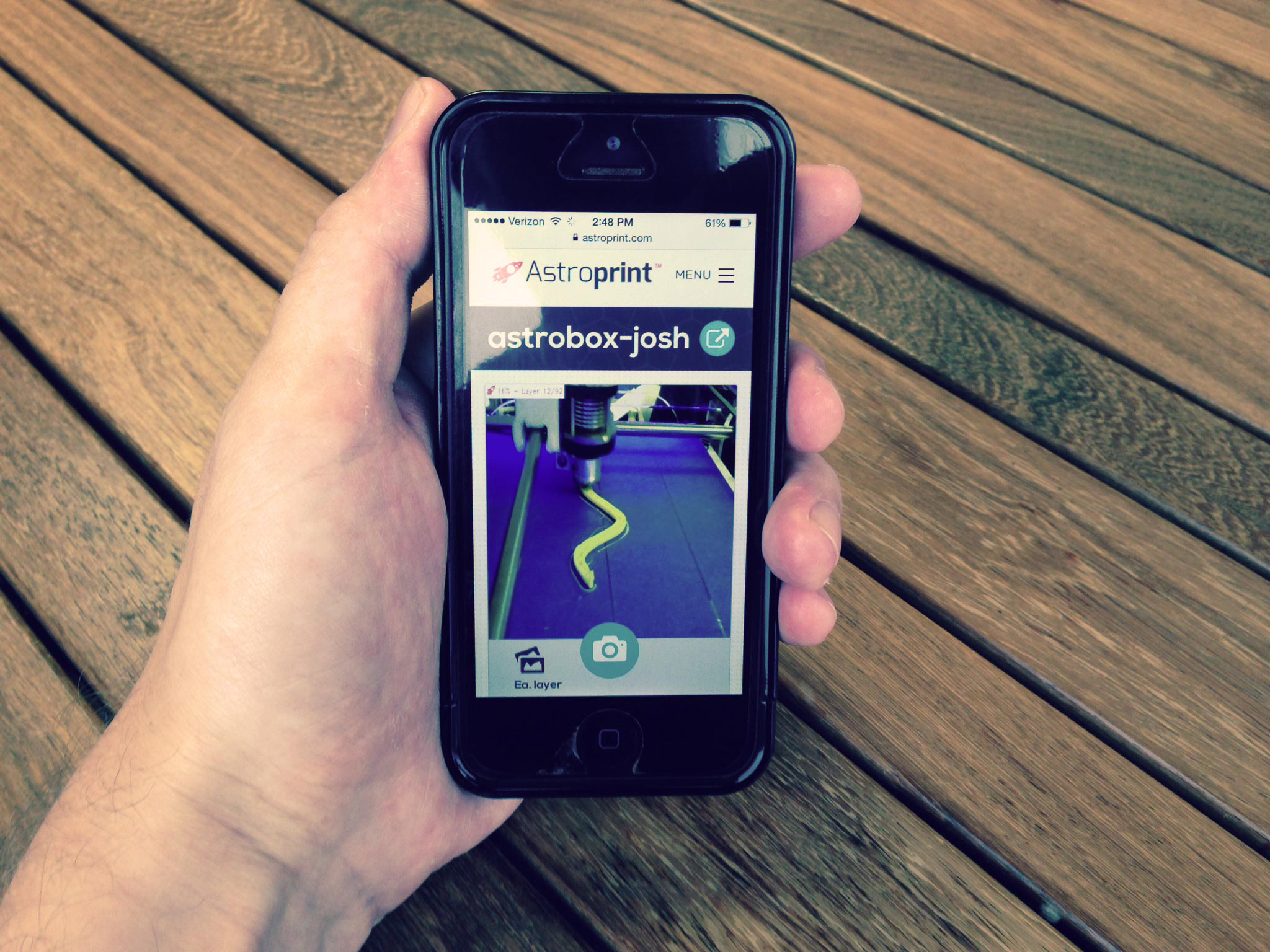
Remotely monitoring a 3D Printer in real time from a phone

== See also ==
- 3D printing
- 3D Printing Marketplace
