= Shapeways =

New York-based 3D printing marketplace and service

Shapeways Holdings, Inc.
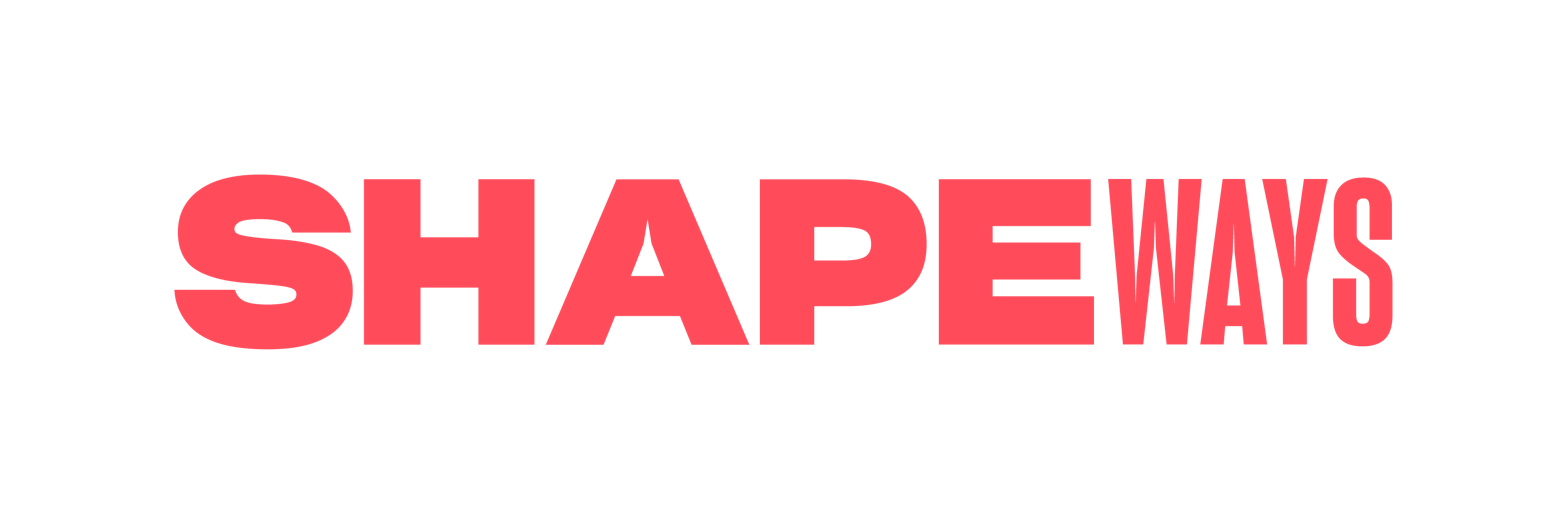

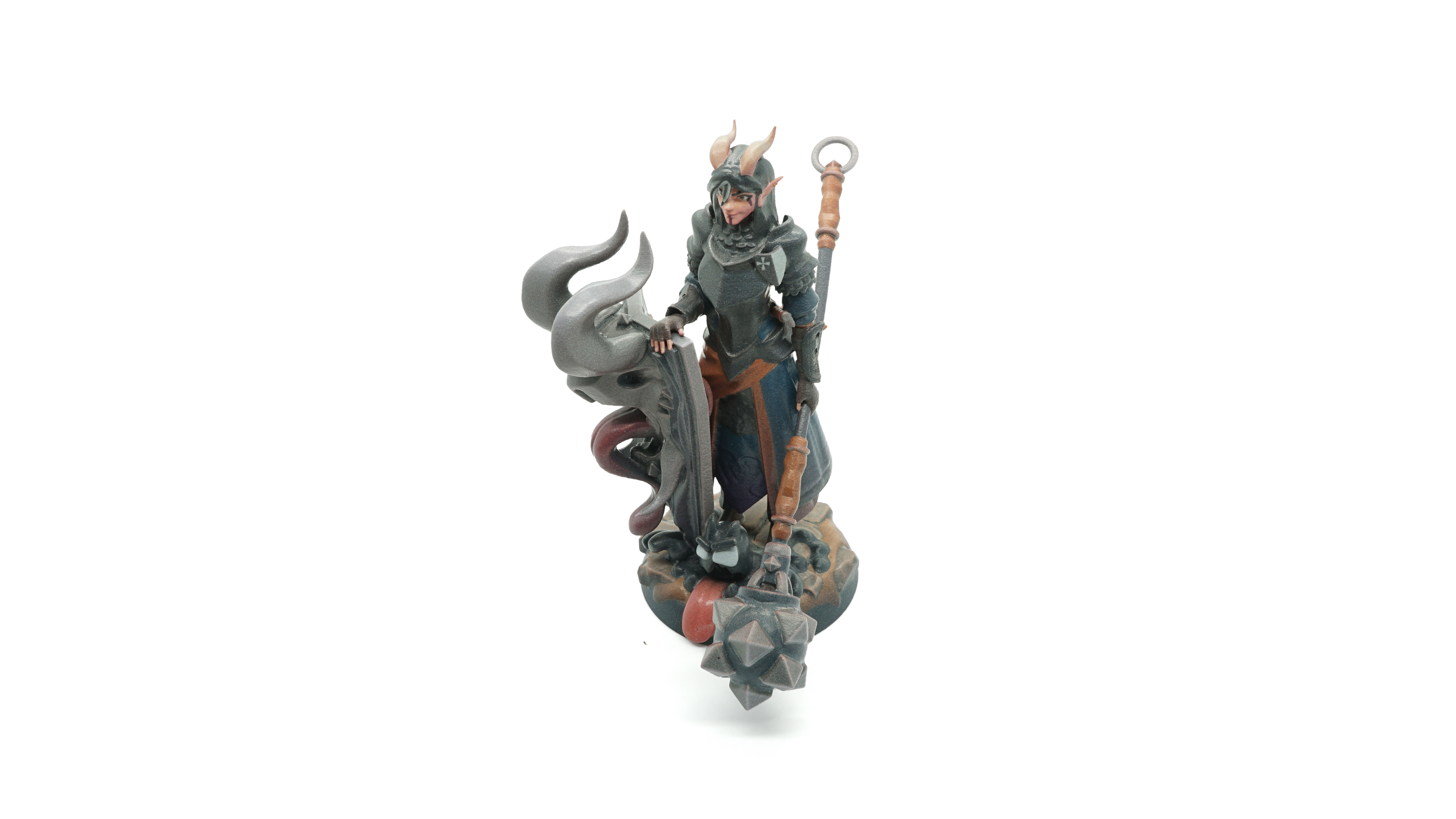
- Type: Private
- Industry: 3D Printing; e-Commerce
- Founded: 2007; 19 years ago December 2024; 1 year ago (as Manuevo BV in 2024)
- Founders: Robert Schouwenburg; Marleen Vogelaar; Peter Weijmarshausen
- Headquarters: Eindhoven
- Area served: Worldwide
- Key people: Marleen Vogelaar (CEO)
- Revenue: ▲US$33 million (2021)
- Owner: Manuevo BV
- Number of employees: 88 (2025)
- Website: shapeways.com

Shapeways, Inc. is a global, 3D printing marketplace and service company. Users design and upload 3D printable files, from which the company prints ordered objects for them, or for others. Users can have objects printed in over 55 materials and finishes, including plastics, precious metals, brass and bronze and, as of 2025, eight additive processes.

The company filed for Chapter 7 bankruptcy in July 2024, and Shapeways was delisted from the New York Stock Exchange (NYSE).

Robert Schouwenburg and Marleen Vogelaar, two original founders of Shapeways, along with the former Dutch management team, formed a phoenix company, as a subsidiary of WVS International Inc, Manuevo BV, and acquired Shapeways' European assets from Dutch bankruptcy that month. By December 2024, Manuevo bought the US trademark and other IP assets, and Shapeways had restarted operations at its Eindhoven plant.

== History ==
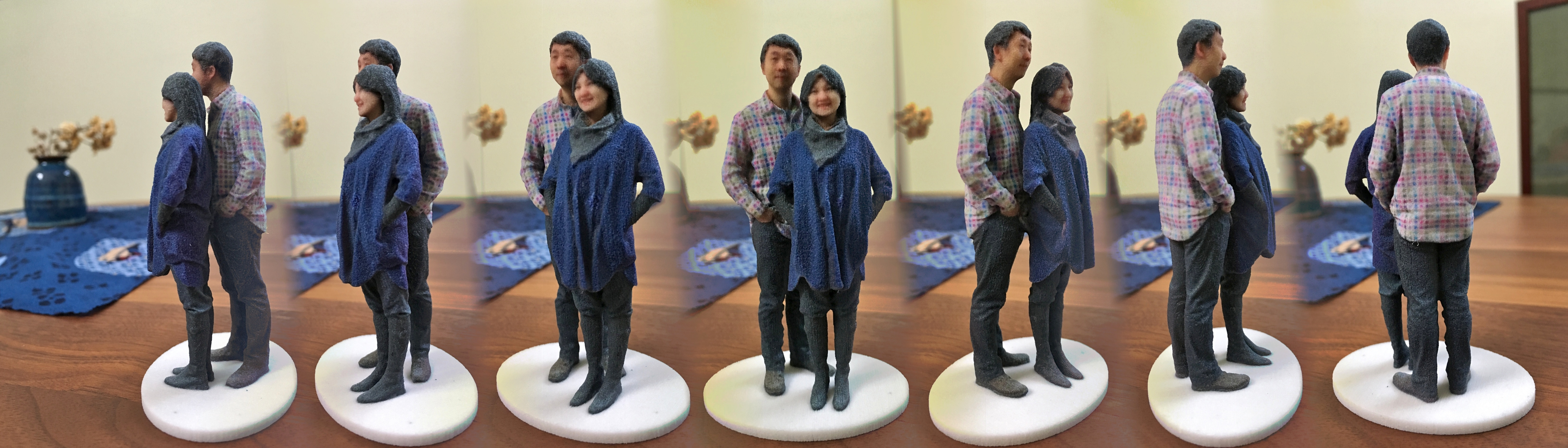
A 3D selfie in 1:20 scale printed by Shapeways, created by Madurodam miniature park from 2D pictures taken at its Fantasitron photo booth.

=== 2007–2017 ===
Shapeways began as a spin-off of Royal Philips Electronics, the Netherlands in 2007. It was founded by Peter Weijmarshausen, Robert Schouwenburg and Marleen Vogelaar and the idea came forth at the Philips design department. The idea of developing a business around 3D printing within Philips was conceived in 2005 by Dolf Wittkämper within the Philips lifestyle incubator program which offers support for start-up companies with innovative ideas; the founders of Shapeways developed their business plan and service within the program.

In 2008, a service was launched that allowed customers to design their own 3D products through rapid prototyping by sending a CAD-file to the Shapeways website to 3D print. Designers can also sell their own designs to be 3D printed on demand for customers, Shapeways handles the financial transaction, manufacture, distribution and customer service; profits go to the designer.

Originally the rapid prototyping could only print using simple materials. Later nylon was added as a possibility. In 2009 it was made public that they succeeded in also manufacturing stainless steel. As of 2012 the scale and possible materials have been further expanded to include sterling silver, acrylic, full color 3D printing and food safe ceramics.

On October 19, 2012 Shapeways opened a new 3D printing factory in Queens, New York that could house 50 industrial printers and produce millions of consumer-designed products a year.

The option now exist for consumers to adapt designs without prior knowledge of 3D design programming. There are models which can be adapted in real time by uploading new text or pictures. There is also the possibility of participating in co-creator platforms in which consumers and designers work together to achieve optimal results. In July 2014, Shapeways announced a partnership program with Hasbro, Inc. to produce 3D printed models of characters from My Little Pony: Friendship Is Magic based on designs created by the adult fan artists from the show and approved by Hasbro. The approach has been seen as a way to lead into other licensed media productions from Hasbro and other Hollywood companies.

=== 2015–2024 ===
On February 21, 2018, Shapeways named Gregory Kress as CEO, replacing Tom Finn.

In 2018, Shapeways announced an agreement with Stratasys to provide entrepreneurs better access to 3D full-color printing using a variety of materials. Since 2019, Shapeways has been able to produce PA-11, a material used in various industries such as aerospace, medical, automotive and more.

In 2019, Shapeways manufactured its 10 millionth printed part. It then produced up to 6,000 products daily, delivered to more than 130 countries.

In September 2019, Shapeways signed a partnership agreement with ZVerse, CADaaS platform, aiming to solve the problem of digital content creation. CADaaS platform enables to optimize 3D files that don't meet required standards and even create new 3D models directly within the Shapeways website. In 2020, Forward AM, BASF’s brand for high-performance materials and services for 3D printing, partnered with Shapeways to offer customers the ability to order 3D-printed items online made with Forward AM material.

In 2021, Shapeways announced having 3D printed over 20 million parts for more than a million customers in 160 countries.

On April 28, 2021, Shapeways and Galileo Acquisition Corp. (NYSE: GLEO), a special-purpose acquisition company, entered into a definitive merger agreement for a merger transaction in which Shapeways will be acquired by Galileo. Upon closing of the transaction, the combined company will be named Shapeways Holdings, Inc. and is expected to remain listed on the NYSE under the new ticker symbol, SHPW. The combined company was led by Greg Kress, Shapeways’ CEO.

=== 2024 bankruptcy ===
On July 2, 2024, Shapeways ceased fulfilling orders and filed for Chapter 7 bankruptcy. The company’s executives all resigned and its assets were put up for liquidation the same day. The company was de-listed from the NYSE that month, following the bankruptcy.

The Netherlands management team, in collaboration with two of the original co-founders, Vogelaar and Shapeways CEO Schouwenburg, formed a phoenix company, Manuevo BV, in Eindhoven, as a subsidiary of WVS International Inc, with factory manager Jules Witte as COO.

The Netherlands subsidiary of Shapeways remained profitable, and was largely unscathed by the demise of the American company; Manuevo therefore aimed to continue servicing Shapeways clients and to retain the former subsidiary's Dutch jobs. The new entity acquired the assets of the bankrupt Shapeways on 29 July, then officially opened on August 1, 2024 when it acquired the Dutch assets from the local Dutch trustee. Manuevo operates internationally.

On 3 December 2024, Vogelaar and Schouwenburg, five months after Manuevo had acquired Shapeways' European assets; WVS International announced that it had bought the US trademark and other IP assets, and that Shapeways had returned to its Eindhoven plant with its founding team, and restarted operations.

=== Post-bankruptcy ===
On December 18, 2024, Shapeways acquired Thangs from Physna Inc. to establish a new ecosystem for creators.

== See also ==
- Pinshape
- Sketchfab
- Thingiverse
- Materialise NV
- Sculpteo
- Cults
- Threeding
- ShapeJS
- Xometry
