= Thingiverse =

Design-sharing website

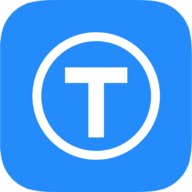
- Website type: Database
- Available in: English
- Owner: MyMiniFactory
- Founders: Zach "Hoeken" Smith, Bre Pettis
- CEO: Romain Kidd
- Key people: Rees Calder (CMO), Arys Andreou (CTO)
- Revenue: Advertisement
- Website: www.thingiverse.com
- Registration: Optional
- Launched: October 18, 2008; 18 years ago
- Current status: Active

Thingiverse is a website dedicated to the sharing of user-created digital design files. Providing primarily free, open-source hardware designs licensed under the GNU General Public License or Creative Commons licenses, the site allows contributors to select a user license type for the designs that they share. 3D printers, laser cutters, milling machines and many other technologies can be used to physically create the files shared by the users on Thingiverse.

Thingiverse is widely used in the DIY technology and Maker communities, by the RepRap Project and by 3D printer and MakerBot operators. Numerous technical projects use Thingiverse as a repository for shared innovation and dissemination of source materials to the public. Many of the object files are intended for the purposes of repair, decoration or organization. Thingiverse houses more than a million open source hardware designs, that allow prosumers to save money by manufacturing their own products rather than purchase them commercially.

== History ==
Thingiverse was started in November 2008 by Zach Smith as a companion site to MakerBot Industries, a DIY 3D printer kit making company. In 2013, Makerbot and Thingiverse were acquired by Stratasys. The open source value creation of Thingiverse was a major component in the value of Makerbot.

Thingiverse received an Honorable Mention in the Digital Communities category of the 2010 ARS Electronica, Prix Ars Electronica international competition for cyber-arts.

As of November 2012, 25,000 designs had been uploaded to Thingiverse; by June 2013, the total exceeded 100,000. The 400,000th Thing was published on July 19, 2014. Many of the designs on Thingiverse are intended for the greater good, such as assistive technologies.

In its terms of use, Thingiverse stipulates that users must not include content that "contributes to the creation of weapons, illegal materials, or is otherwise objectionable." In 2012, Thingiverse removed an uploaded design for an entirely 3D-printed gun. In response, the gun's designers launched the site DEFCAD, designed to host Thingiverse's "censored" files.

In September 2022, Ultimaker and MakerBot closed a merger, placing Thingiverse under the new UltiMaker brand.

In February 2026, MyMiniFactory acquired 100% of Thingiverse from UltiMaker and replaced the executive leadership. Currently, the company is led by Romain Kidd as CEO.

== Open-source hardware ==
Whereas many open-source hardware projects focus on project-specific materials, Thingiverse provides a common ground from which derivatives and mashups can form. These derivatives typically involve users modifying or improving existing designs and uploading them back to the site. Because all models on the site are open source, this behavior is actively encouraged by the site and community. Thingiverse is one of the first websites to allow customization of parametric designs made with OpenSCAD. OpenSCAD is a free and open source software that uses scripting to design 3D objects.

Many 3D printers can be upgraded with 3D-printed parts. Thingiverse users produce many improvements and modifications for a variety of platforms. Popular examples of community-based 3D printer projects include the RepRap project and the Contraptor project. Some 3D printers can be almost entirely 3D-printed themselves.

== See also ==
- 3D printing
- 3D modeling
- 3D scanning
- 3D Printing Marketplace
- Sketchfab
- .dwg
- Pinshape
- Materialise NV
- 3DLT
- Sculpteo
- Shapeways
- Cults
- Threeding
- STL (file format)
