= 3D Slash =

3D modeling software

- Stable release: 3.2.1 (02.2020) / February 25, 2020; 6 years ago
- Operating system: web browser, Windows, macOS, Linux
- Type: 3D modeling software
- License: Proprietary
- Website: 3dslash.net

3D Slash is a voxel based 3D modeling software application produced by Sylvain Huet. It allows users to create models using cuboids of varying sizes (from 1 unit up to 1024) following the octree model.

== Background ==
The inspiration for 3D Slash came from kids playing Minecraft and the way they intuitively develop sophisticated 3D models without noticing it. Because of this, 3D Slash uses an octree model where geometry is represented by a tree of deformed cuboid shapes, with curved shapes also being approximated by small cuboids of the octree.

3D Slash is specifically meant for designing 3D printable objects, and its user experience focuses on a "stone-cutter metaphor". As part of this metaphor, it provides an original toolset, including the hammer tool (to remove a cuboid), the trowel (to add a cuboid), the chisel (to remove slices of cuboids), the brush (to set the color of cuboids), and the wood filler (to add a slice of cuboids), among others.

3D Slash is capable of outputting .STL files through its import/export functionality. 3D Slash computes the mesh approximation in terms of an octree's cuboids on import, and the reverse operation for the export: computation of the octree's mesh envelope as triangles.

3D Slash enables community links with the possibility to share, like and re-use 3D designs among members. Printing is directly possible thanks to commercial partnerships.

3D Slash is integrated in various websites. As of January 2017 it is the only STL customization plugin for Thingiverse. It is the only 3D modeling app integrated in GoogleDrive. It is available as a plugin in Onshape.

With 3D Slash, Sylvain Huet was awarded the 2014 Lépine Gold Medal, and two Maker of Merit ribbons at Paris MakerFaire 2014 from the organizer Le FabShop and from Sketchup.

Since its release, the ease of use of 3D Slash has been recognized by various actors from the 3D printing and Education fields.

== 3D Slash Uses ==
3D Slash is a user-friendly 3D modeling software designed to make 3D design accessible, fun, and easy to use. Created with the goal of simplifying 3D modeling, the software employs a unique interface resembling a building game, making it intuitive for beginners to create 3D models. The idea was to provide an engaging way for both children and adults to learn and enjoy 3D design.

One of the main challenges in developing 3D Slash was balancing simplicity with functionality. The developers needed to ensure the software was user-friendly enough for beginners while still offering advanced features for more experienced users. Additionally, integrating offline and online synchronization capabilities posed a technical challenge.

Today, 3D Slash is widely used in various fields. It's popular in educational settings, helping students learn about 3D printing and modeling. It's also utilized by hobbyists, small businesses, and professionals in fields such as architecture and jewelry design. The software's ability to import and modify existing 3D files makes it a versatile tool for a wide range of projects.

== Technical information ==
The software starts from a primary cuboid (i.e. including form) and manages the related arborescence in which each cuboid is either full, either empty or subdivided in 8 cuboids. An arbitrary color can be attached to any full cuboid. The octree model enables the software to implicitly define the level of details (LOD) by cutting the octree according to an arbitrary depth.

3D Slash is written in Metal, a functional language designed by Sylvain Huet in 2003.

3D Slash is available for Windows, MacOS and Linux. A special version is also available for Raspberry Pi An Android version is available on the Sqool, a French tablet for education.

3D Slash is also available as a web app on any webGL browser including iOS and Android devices.

== Content license ==
As of January 2017, the EULA states that any content created in 3D Slash online or that is uploaded to the community webpages from the offline editor are automatically licensed as Creative Common License BY - NC - SA, unless the premium license subscription is purchased.
