= 3D printing marketplace =

Website for digital 3D printable files

- Website type: Marketplace
- Commercial: Yes
- Current status: Active

A 3D printing marketplace is a website where users buy, sell and freely share digital 3D printable files for use on 3D printers. They sometimes also offer the ability to print the models and ship them to customers.

== Concept ==
The market for 3D printers grew significantly during the 2010s. According to Wohlers Report 2018, 3D printer Market reached 7.3 billions $ in 2017, with +21% growth over the previous year. The market is mostly B2B right now, because 3D printing is still a complex process. But even for SMB or freelance, they cannot develop all the knowledge around this technology, that's why 3D printing marketplace have been developing since the last years.

3D printing is a rapidly developing field, that reaches many in the industry as well as mainstream users.

The open source community helps with the effort and makes the 3D creative and learning experience accessible to anyone who wishes, while lowering the barriers for the community worldwide.

Industries and sectors benefiting from the technology are aerospace, medical (dental, maxillofacial, craniofacial, cosmetic surgery, medical equipment, orthopedics, bio-printing), automobile, engineering, tools, toys, architecture, construction, jewelry, fashion, design, food, art, entertainment and education.

== How 3D printing marketplaces work ==
3D printing marketplaces are a combination of file sharing websites, with or without a built in e-commerce capability. Designers upload suitable files for 3D printing whilst other users buy or freely download the uploaded files for printing. The marketplaces facilitate the account management, infrastructure, server resources and guarantees safe settlement of payments (e-commerce). Some of the marketplaces also offer additional services such as 3D printing on demand, location of commercial 3D print shops, associated software for model rendering and dynamic viewing of items using packages such as Sketchfab. The most widely used 3D printable file formats as of 2020 are STL, OBJ file, AMF, and 3MF.

== Type of 3D printing marketplaces ==
There are different varieties of 3D printing marketplaces. Some of them, like Thingiverse are dedicated to free sharing of 3D printable files. Others, like Shapeways, offer a 3D printing service for objects which have been provided for sale by designers. A third type, like MyMiniFactory, offers a combination of the other two types, with the main activity being the free sharing of 3D printable files; these also offer print-on-demand and design-on-demand services. Another category are websites such as Threeding, which offer free and commercial exchanges of digital 3D printable files for use on 3D printers, but do not directly include 3D printing services themselves. These free marketplaces offer integration to databases of 3D printers provided by third parties.

All three resources described contain geo-location services to several thousand registered 3D printers. The two largest personal 3D printers manufacturers—Makerbot (part of Stratasys) and Cubify (a subsidiary of 3D Systems)—offer their own file repositories for sharing, respectively Thingiverse and Cubify Store. For professional 3D printing, there are also platforms that offer a reverse-bid style auction interface, an integrated escrow payment system, and many features specifically tailored for B2B transactions.

In 2024, 3DSourced, a 3D printing magazine, ranked the 11 best 3D marketplaces, which included Sculpteo, Shapeways, and Xometry in the top 3 of the list.

== Copyright concerns ==
Current intellectual property (IP) legislation in the developed countries does not explicitly regulate 3D printing. This creates numerous questions about the IP status of 3D printing marketplaces. Some analysts predict that 3D printing marketplaces will be "the next Napster". Most marketplaces remain conservative on this topic. Most large 3D printing marketplaces also have procedures for copyright complaints. Further development of 3D printing and more new marketplaces for file sharing will most probably cause copyright to become a significant issue in them.

== Security concerns ==
Movements like "3D2A", focusing on printing and marketing gun parts, have emerged to the alarm of international law enforcement efforts and security researchers.

== List of 3D printing marketplaces ==
- AstroPrint
- Clara.io
- MyMiniFactory
- Pinshape
- Polar Cloud
- Materialise NV
- Sculpteo
- Shapeways
- Sketchfab
- Thingiverse
- Threeding
- Cults
- DEFCAD
- Xometry

== See also ==
- 3DLT
- 3D scanning
- 3D modeling
- 3D printing
