= MessageCast =

MessageCast was a venture-backed start-up, syndicating RSS over SMS and IM. Launched in 2002 by two co-founders, MessageCast offered large scale message delivery. The company was acquired by Microsoft (symbol MSFT) in May, 2005.

== History ==
MessageCast was started by two co-founders, Royal Farros and Dave Hodson in 2002.

The company was acquired by Microsoft in May, 2005.
