= CG artist =

Artist using computer graphics to create images

CG artists (also known as computer graphics artists) create 2D and 3D art, usually for cinema, advertising or animation movies. A CG artist's work usually revolves around finding balance between artistic sensibilities and technical limitations while working within a development team.

In a game development context, CG artists work closely with game directors, art directors, animators, game designers and level designers. CG artists (typically, technical artists) will also work with game programmers to ensure that the 3D models and assets created by the art team function as desired inside a game engine.

CG artists are typically skilled at creating both 2D and 3D digital art, and often specialize in one or more subsets of content creation such as: hard surface modeling, organic modelling, concept art painting, architectural rendering, animation, and/or visual effects. If the CG artist is a technical artist, they will usually also have programming skills such as shader and script writing, character rigging, and/or skill in languages such as Python, MEL, C++, or C#.

CG artists often begin their career with a degree from an animation school, an arts discipline, or in computer science.
