= CGTrader =

3D model marketplace

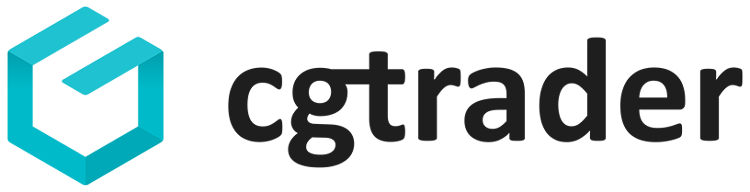
- Website type: 3D Model Marketplace
- Available in: English
- Headquarters: Vilnius, Lithuania
- Founders: Marius Kalytis, Dalia Lašaitė
- Industry: 3D Design
- Website: cgtrader.com
- Commercial: Yes
- Registration: free
- Users: Over 2,000,000
- Launched: March 3, 2011
- Current status: Active

CGTrader is a 3D model marketplace for VR/AR and CG projects, and professional 3D designer community. It was founded in 2011 and is headquartered in Vilnius, Lithuania. CGTrader has attracted funding from Practica Capital, a seed and venture fund based in Vilnius, as well as from Intel Capital.

== History ==
The company was founded in 2011 in Vilnius, Lithuania, by Marius Kalytis, a 3D modeller and entrepreneur. In May 2019, CGTrader announced that it had reached a milestone of 800,000 3D models and 2,000,000 users.

=== Financing ===
In 2013 the first funding round amounting to 185,000 EUR was received from Practica Capital, a seed and venture fund based in Vilnius, Lithuania. Dalia Lasaite, a serial entrepreneur, joined the company as a co-founder in 2013 and now is CEO.

In 2013, the company raised an undisclosed amount of funding from Intel Capital and Practica Capital.

In 2017, the company raised US$2.3M from Karma Ventures to invest in marketplace growth and improve designer workflows.

In 2021, CGTrader raised $9.5 million in Series B round led by Evli Growth Partners, alongside repeat investors Karma Ventures and LVV Group. Mikael Hed, the ex-CEO of Rovio (the company behind Angry Birds), has invested privately and joined CGTrader board as Chairman.

=== Acknowledgements ===
In May, 2015, CGTrader won Global Pitch Competition 2015 as well as a prize of 30,000 euros in Latitude59, an annual tech event in Estonia. The same month company was awarded the 1st place prize in Login Startup Fair Pitch Challenge in Vilnius, Lithuania.

In May 2016, the Hundert, a Berlin-based startup publication, named Dalia Lasaite as one of Top 100 European female entrepreneurs.

Forbes mentioned CGTrader among the 8 most ambitious startups from Lithuania in May, 2016.

== Service ==
CGTrader runs an online 3D model marketplace for 3D designers and CG industry-related buyers. Freelance 3D designers, design companies and 3D modeling hobbyists upload their works, set up descriptions, images, video previews (optional) and pricing. Uploaders should also select one of the categories - CG, low poly or 3D printing - and provide more technical details about their models. Buyers can choose from several file formats (if uploaded by 3D modellers). CGTrader allows buyers to communicate with model authors directly. Buyers interested in 3D models can also bid their price and negotiate with designers. Alternatively, buyers can post job offers and order custom models in a 3D job board.

The digital files of the purchased models can be downloaded from the system directly or following the link delivered via email. For 3D printing ready models, there are several options such as buying the model itself or paying to stream it to a 3D printer.

In May 2019, the company introduced CGTrader ARsenal for online retailers. Designed for 3D product visualization for eCommerce.

=== Royalty system ===
CGTrader operates on a royalty-based system, with artists receiving a percentage of the royalties generated from their sales. Originally ranging from 70% to 90%, the payout rates were reduced for the second time in two years on September 15, 2026, to a range of 55% to 80%, despite the founder's original aim of offering better terms to designers: « Platforms took almost 50% of [the artists'] royalties and commissions, that's why I wanted to introduce better terms to designers and that's why I started CGTrader. ». The royalty rates applied are based on reputation system: new users start from Beginner level and can rank up to Legendary level with royalty rates changing accordingly. Reputation points are collected by the means of community interactions, referrals of new users as well as assigned based on quality ratings of models uploaded, number of model sales and other actions.

=== Community system ===
CGTrader has a Community portal, where registered users can browse community-sourced tutorial section and designers' galleries that showcase their artwork, read a company blog, create and participate in forum discussions, and take part in 3D design competitions.
