= Polar Cloud =

American software platform for 3D printers

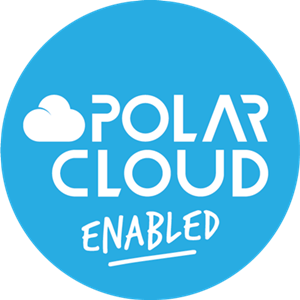
- The Polar Cloud Enabled Logo
- Website type: 3D printing marketplace
- Founded: April 1, 2014
- Headquarters: Cincinnati, Ohio
- Industry: Education Technology
- Parent: Polar3D, Inc.
- Website: polar3d.com
- Registration: Optional
- Users: 484,598
- Current status: Active

The Polar Cloud is an American software platform for 3D printers that is owned and operated by Polar3D, LLC. The platform was launched in March 2017 and is now home to over 500,000 users in 160 countries. The platform is home to several programs and initiatives, including the Boys & Girls Club of America, GE's Additive Education Program, and a COVID-19 Mask Making effort.

As of December 2020, members have performed over 1.697 million 3D Prints on the platform, making it the largest remote 3D printing platform and service in the world.

== History ==
=== Acquisitions and milestones ===
In April 2016, Polar3D acquired STEAMtrax curriculum from 3D Systems. STEAMtrax is an NGSS aligned STEM curriculum that incorporates 3D Printing and is accompanied by a physical kit for completion in the classroom.

In October 2016, the Polar Cloud reached 100,000 3D Print jobs.

=== Beer Hall Mask Factory ===
Starting in April 2020, Polar3D collaborated with local non-profit Cintrifuse and Infotrust to help run the "Beer Hall Mask Factory", a volunteer effort to produce a 3D Printed mask designed by Spanish outfitter, LaFactoria3D for frontline workers who had limited supply at the time. The 3D printers ran for a total of 85,873 hours and produced a total of 26,285 masks. The printers were then donated to schools around the globe.

== Services ==
The Polar Cloud allows connection to a 3D Printer for remote monitoring and printing via a web browser. 3D Printers that have adequate processors and networking components onboard can connect natively, running the code on the machine itself. Popular manufacturers that have cloud-enabled their machines are Flashforge, Dremel Digilab, Monoprice, Sindoh, and Ultimaker.

3D printers that lack the power necessary require the use of a Raspberry Pi and a plugin, through the open source Octoprint application. Most of the printers added using this method are manufactured by either Creality or Prusa Research.

Polar has recently added a commerce functionality to the platform by using Stripe (company) to allow published objects to be "tipped" or purchased at a price set by the user. Schools that use the platform can also accept one-time or monthly (i.e. recurring) donations.

== Programs and adoption ==
=== GE Additive Education Program ===
GE Additive (a subsidiary of General Electric that supports GE Aviation) contacted Polar3D in April 2017 to help administer the GE Additive Education Program to its global audience. In the first two years of the program, the GE AEP donated over 1,400 polymer 3D printers to 1,000 schools in 30 countries, providing access to technology and curriculum to more than 500,000 students. Jason Oliver, President & CEO of GE Additive had this to say about the program and its beginnings:

"The sooner we put additive technology in the hands of the next generation of engineers, materials scientists and chemists, the sooner we can realize its potential”

GE Additive has been using Concept Laser machines to 3D print metal parts for the LEAP engine and believes that the program will help garner interest in additive manufacturing and empower students around the globe.

== See also ==
- 3D printing
- 3D printing marketplace
