= 3D Content Retrieval =

Information retrieval for 3D models

A 3D Content Retrieval system is a computer system for browsing, searching and retrieving three dimensional digital contents (e.g.: Computer-aided design, molecular biology models, and cultural heritage 3D scenes, etc.) from a large database of digital images. The most original way of doing 3D content retrieval uses methods to add description text to 3D content files such as the content file name, link text, and the web page title so that related 3D content can be found through text retrieval. Because of the inefficiency of manually annotating 3D files, researchers have investigated ways to automate the annotation process and provide a unified standard to create text descriptions for 3D contents. Moreover, the increase in 3D content has demanded and inspired more advanced ways to retrieve 3D information. Thus, shape matching methods for 3D content retrieval have become popular. Shape matching retrieval is based on techniques that compare and contrast similarities between 3D models.

== 3D retrieval methods ==
Derive a high level description (e.g.: a skeleton) and then find matching results

This method describes 3D models by using a skeleton. The skeleton encodes the geometric and topological information in the form of a skeletal graph and uses graph matching techniques to match the skeletons and compare them. However, this method requires a 2-manifold input model, and it is very sensitive to noise and details. Many of the existing 3D models are created for visualization purposes, while missing the input quality standard for the skeleton method. The skeleton 3D retrieval method needs more time and effort before it can be used widely.

Compute a feature vector based on statistics

Unlike Skeleton modeling, which requires a high quality standard for the input source, statistical methods do not put restriction on the validity of an input source. Shape histograms, feature vectors composed of global geo-metic properties such as circularity and eccentricity, and feature vectors created using frequency decomposition of spherical functions are common examples of using statistical methods to describe 3D information.

2D projection method

Some approaches use 2D projections of a 3D model, justified by the assumption that if two objects are similar in 3D, then they should have similar 2D projections in many directions. Prototypical Views and Light field description are good examples of 2D projection methods.

== 3D Engineering Search System ==
In Purdue University, researchers led by Professor Karthik Ramani at the Research and Education Center for Information created a 3D search engine called the 3D Engineering Search System (3DESS). It is designed to find computer-generated engineering parts.

The mechanism behind this search engine is that it starts from an algorithm which can transform query drawing to voxels, then extracts the most important shape information from the voxels by using another algorithm called thinning, and formulates a skeleton of the object’s outlines and topology. After that, 3DESS will develop a skeletal graph to render the skeleton, using three common topological constructs: loops, edges, and nodes. The processed common constructs graph can reduce the data amount to represent an object, and it is easier to store and index the description in a database.

According to the lead professor, 3DESS can also describe objects using feature vectors, such as volume, surface area, etc. The system processes queries by comparing their feature vectors or skeletal graphs with data stored in the database. When the system retrieves models in response to the query, users can pick whichever object looks more similar to what they want and leave feedback.

== Challenges ==
Challenges associated with 3D shape-based similarity queries

With the skeleton modeling 3D retrieval method, figuring out an efficient way to index 3D shape descriptors is very challenging because 3D shape indexing has very strict criteria. The 3D models must be the following: quick to compute, concise to store, easy to index, invariant under similarity transformations, insensitive to noise and small extra features, robust to arbitrary topological degeneracies, and able to discriminate shape differences at many scales.

3D search and retrieval with multimodal support challenges

In order to make the 3D search interface simple enough for novice users who know little on 3D retrieval input source requirements, a multimodal retrieval system, which can take various types of input sources and provide robust query results, is necessary. So far, only a few approaches have been proposed. In Funkhouser et al. (2003), the proposed “Princeton 3D search engine” supports 2D sketches, 3D sketches, 3D models and text as queries. In Chen et al. (2003), he designed a 3D retrieval system that intakes 2D sketches and retrieves for 3D objects. Recently, Ansary et al. (2007) proposed a 3D retrieval framework using 2D photographic images, sketches, and 3D models.

== See also ==
- AI CAD libraries
