= MyMiniFactory =

Website

- Website type: 3D Design sharing platform
- Available in: English, French, Chinese, Spanish, German, Italian
- CEO: Nebojsa Nikolic
- Industry: 3D printing
- Website: www.myminifactory.com
- Commercial: Yes
- Registration: Optional
- Launched: 18 June 2013
- Current status: Active

MyMiniFactory is a file 3D printable object-sharing platform where 3D printers can share their design and ideas. It was founded in 2013 and headquartered in London, United Kingdom. The online platform hosts digital creators with a primary focus on hobbyist with an interest in 3D printing.

== History ==
In June 2018, MyMiniFactory opened an online STL file store where 3D designers can sell 3D printable files.

MyMiniFactory allow brands to crowdsource via 3D design competitions. The platform has collaborated with brands such as the Warner Bros Group – Turner's Adventure Time, Rovio's Angry Birds, Autodesk, Google and the Exxon Group.

In 2024, the Youmagine platform was acquired, and on the 12th of February 2026, the complete acquisition of Thingiverse by MyMiniFactory was announced.

== See also ==
- 3D printing marketplace
