= 3DLT =

American 3D printing marketplace

- Company type: Private
- Industry: 3D Printing, e-Commerce, Marketplace
- Founded: 2012
- Headquarters: Covington, Kentucky
- Area served: Worldwide
- Website: www.3dlt.com

3DLT was a Covington, Kentucky based 3D printing marketplace for 3D printing as-a-service. Users of 3DLT designed and uploaded 3D printable files and 3DLT worked to print and sell those products. The company was formed in 2012 and ceased operations at the end of 2015.

== History ==
The company was co-founded by John Hauer and Pablo Arellano Jr. and Colin Klayer in 2012 as a place to upload and buy 3D printable files. In August 2013, 3DLT applied to the UpTech accelerator program and was accepted. Also in 2013, 3DLT participated in TechCrunch Disrupt in New York. Also in 2013, 3DLT was named an "Innovative World Technology" competitor at the SXSW V2V Conference.

3DLT named John Hauer as CEO in early 2014. Hauer replaced Arellano Jr. as CEO, with Arellano Jr. leaving the company. In February 2014, 3DLT partnered Authentise to stream licensed 3D content and thus protect intellectual Property.

In mid-2014, 3DLT and PieceMaker announced plans to collaborate and share content, technology and in-store marketing and production. In particular, the company was promoting 3-D printing kiosks made by Piecemaker that used its designs in retail stores.

3DLT had recently partnered to offer 3D printed products with Amazon.com as a new pilot program in Amazon's new 3D printing category, 3DLT w Amazon. It worked with Amazon, says the Cincinnati Journal, to help "Amazon pioneer a new division for 3-D-printed products."

In June 2014, 3DLT also participated in the Dark Horse Competition in Silicon Valley. Later that same year, 3DLT signed a licensing agreement with Big Tent Entertainment to design, sell and manufacture 3D printed products based on the character Domo-kun. Around the same time, 3DLT also launched its Rakuten store of 3D printable products ranging from fashion jewelry to home decor and tech accessories.

As 2015 began, 3DLT announced partnership with Sears to ship custom manufactured items "from jewelry to home furnishings" through Sears' e-commerce website.

The company closed operations on 31 December 2015 after a decision from 3DLT's board of directors.

== See also ==
- 3D printing marketplace
