= Repetier-Host =

3D printing software

- Developer(s): Hot-World GmbH & Co. KG
- Stable release: 2.3.2
- Operating system: Windows, macOS, Linux
- Available in: English, German, French, Portuguese, Italian, Swedish, Finnish, Chinese, Japanese, Russian, Greece, Persian, Turkey, Dutch, Polish
- Type: 3D printing software
- Website: www.repetier.com

Repetier-Host is a 3D printing application developed by Hot-World GmbH & Co. KG.
