= Cura (software) =

3D printer software

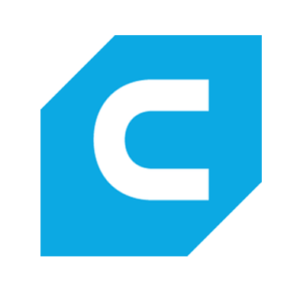
- Developers: David Braam, Ultimaker
- Stable release: 5.11.0 / 23 October 2025
- Written in: C++, Python, QML
- Operating system: Windows, macOS, Linux
- Available in: 15 languages
- List of languages English, German, French, Spanish, Italian, Dutch, Polish, Finnish, Brazilian Portuguese, Portuguese, Russian, Turkish, Simplified Chinese, Korean, Japanese
- Type: 3D printer slicing application
- License: Free and open-source LGPLv3
- Website: ultimaker.com/software/ultimaker-cura
- Repository: https://github.com/Ultimaker/Cura

Cura is an open source slicing application for 3D printers. It was created by David Braam who was later employed by Ultimaker, a 3D printer manufacturing company, to maintain the software. Cura is available under LGPLv3 license. Cura was initially released under the open source Affero General Public License version 3, but on 28 September 2017 the license was changed to LGPLv3. This change allowed for more integration with third-party CAD applications. Development is hosted on GitHub. Ultimaker Cura is used by over one million users worldwide and handles 1.4 million print jobs per week. It is the preferred 3D printing slicer for Ultimaker 3D printers, but it can be used with other printers as well.

== Technical specifications ==
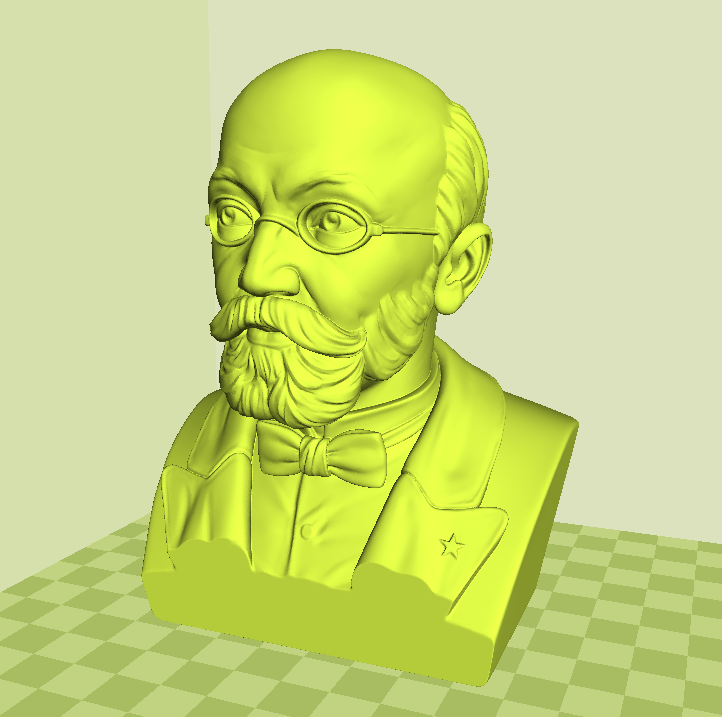
View of STL file in Ultimaker Cura

Ultimaker Cura works by slicing the user's model file into layers and generating a printer-specific g-code. Once finished, the g-code can be sent to the printer for the manufacture of the physical object.

The open source software, compatible with most desktop 3D printers, can work with files in the most common 3D formats such as STL, OBJ, X3D, 3MF as well as image file formats such as BMP, GIF, JPG, and PNG.

== Major software versions ==
- 7 June 2016: Ultimaker announced the new Cura major release 2.1.2, superseding the previous 15.04.6 version (note the non-sequentiality in the major version numbers).
- September 2016: Version 2.3 was a major release. It includes new printing profiles, slicing features, as well as increasing speed. It also supported the dual extrusion possible with the Ultimaker 3 model.
- 17 October 2017: Version 3.0 updated the user interface and allowed for CAD integration. This was the first version with plugin support.
- November 2017: Cura Connect was released to enable users to control, monitor, and configure a group of network-enabled 3D printers from a single interface.
- October 2018: Beginning with version 3.5, all files are saved in the 3MF format for improved compatibility with other 3D software. Hotkeys were introduced as well as a searchable profile guide.
- November 2018: Version 3.6 introduced material profile support for materials made by major manufacturers such as BASF, DuPont, Clariant, and other members of the Materials Alliance Program consortium.
- March 2019: Version 4.0 made significant changes to the user interface. In support of plugin capabilities, a star-based rating system was incorporated to allow users to rate plugins. Cloud-backup functionality was added as well as support for more third-party printers.
- 21 April 2022: Release of Ultimaker Cura 5.0 beta, which introduced a rebuilt slicer engine that allowed for much finer details, stronger prints, faster print profiles, support for Apple M1 chips, and an improved UI.
- 17 May 2022: Release of Ultimaker Cura 5.0

== Plugins ==
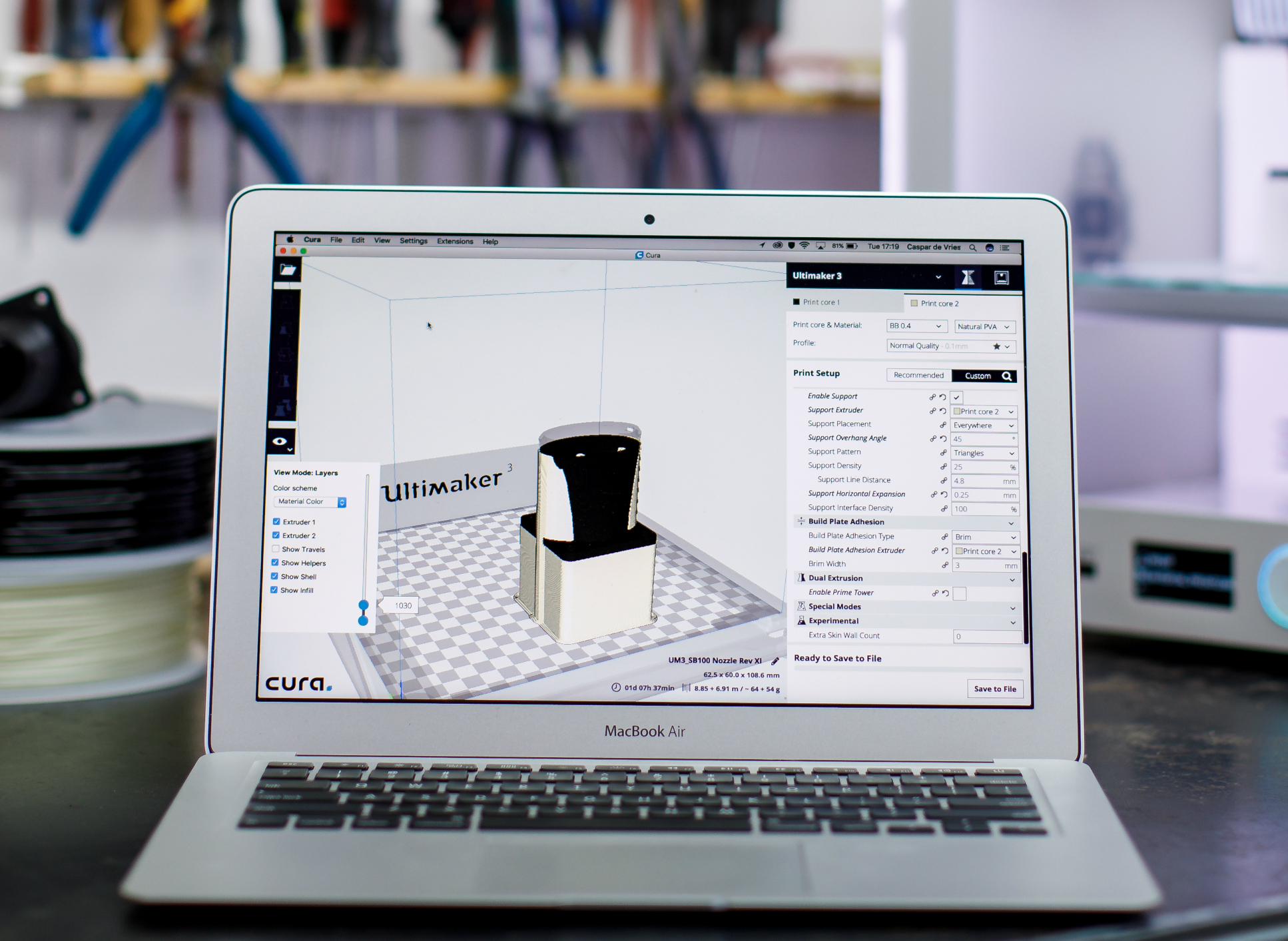
Screen of Cura on an Apple Macbook Air 2008-2017

Release 3.0 introduced plugin capability. Users can develop their own plugins or use plugins commercially available. Plugins simplify workflow for users by allowing them to quickly perform tasks like opening a file from a menu or exporting a file from an application. Starting with Release 4.0, users can rate plugins using a star system.

Current plugins include: SolidWorks, Siemens NX, HP 3D Scanning, MakePrintable, Autodesk Inventor.

== Media coverage ==
On August 31, 2014, Cura was included in a review of 3D slicing software by Think3DPrint3D.

In the summer of 2015, Ultimaker released Cura 2.0.

On January 1, 2018, All3DP named Cura one of the best 3D slicer software tools.

In 2019, Cura was named one of the top free 3D printing tools by the industry blog, G2.

Cura was named Software Tool of the Year at the international 2019 3D Printing Industry Awards ceremony in London.

== See also ==
- List of 3D printing software
