= Sketchfab =

3D model hosting and sharing platform

- Website type: 3D models platform
- Available in: English
- Website: sketchfab.com
- Commercial: Yes
- Registration: Free (Optional)
- Users: 6,000,000
- Launched: March 10, 2011 (original); 2012 (current)
- Current status: Active

Sketchfab is a 3D asset website used to publish, share, and discover 3D, VR and AR content. It provides a viewer based on the WebGL and WebXR technologies that allows users to display 3D models on the web, to be viewed on any mobile browser, desktop browser or Virtual Reality headset.

The company behind it is today based in Paris and New York City. Sketchfab took part in the Spring 2013 TechStars New York City startup accelerator program, raised $2 million in December 2013 and $7 million in June 2015.

On July 21, 2021, Epic Games acquired Sketchfab. On March 22, 2023 it was announced that Sketchfab would be merged into Epic Games' upcoming marketplace called Fab, however this was delayed by a year.

On October 22, 2024 coinciding with Fab's launch it was announced that the Sketchfab Store (where creators were able to sell licensable content) will close, and that all further purchases and sells will be done through Fab.

On August 12, 2026 KitBash acquired Sketchfab.

== Service ==
=== Viewer ===
The main product of Sketchfab is a 3D, virtual reality (VR) and augmented reality (AR) model viewer. It enables users to move freely around or inside the 3D scene using mouse, touch manipulation, VR or AR. In addition to static 3D models, the viewer is able to play and control 3D animations. Viewers can enable the VR mode to see the model in Virtual Reality headsets or the AR mode to visualise the model within the real world via a mobile device.

The 3D viewer is used on the Sketchfab website and mobile apps, but can also be embedded on external websites, notably on Facebook, Twitter or Wordpress.

=== Portal and marketplace ===
Sketchfab provides online and mobile community portals, where visitors can browse, rate, download and buy user-generated 3D models.

Users of Sketchfab have profile pages, premium users can customize and share their models privately. Sketchfab users can choose to make their 3D model files available for download under Creative Commons licenses or to sell them in the Sketchfab store. With content available for sale or download, Sketchfab is positioned as a 3D model marketplace and as a 3D printing marketplace since some models are compatible with 3D printing.

=== 3D asset management ===
Sketchfab offers to paying enterprise customers a dedicated platform to share, manage and collaborate on 3D assets.

=== Native applications ===
A selection of Sketchfab models are available within a native application for the following VR headsets: Google Cardboard, Samsung Gear VR, HTC Vive and Oculus Rift.

The mobile application can be used to view the 3D models in Augmented Reality leveraging the ARKit APIs on iOS and ARCore on Android.

=== Model upload and download ===
3D models can be uploaded to Sketchfab from its website or directly from various 3D software, using plugins (for example for 3ds Max or SketchUp) or natively (from Blender or Adobe Photoshop).

Sketchfab offers an API allowing developers to integrate functionality for searching and downloading Sketchfab's Creative Commons-licensed 3D models into their applications.

== Technology ==
Sketchfab relies on the WebGL JavaScript API to display 3D on web pages in all major modern web browsers. It does not rely on third-party plugins.

Sketchfab implements the WebVR JavaScript API to provide a virtual reality mode of its viewer on compatible VR headsets.

The 3D viewer uses the open-source OSG.JS JavaScript library, a library created and largely maintained by Sketchfab employees. Rendering is achieved using classic real-time rendering or physically based rendering.

== Company ==
Sketchfab was initially created by entrepreneur and 3D developer Cédric Pinson under the domain name ShowWebGL in early 2011. He was joined in early 2012 by Alban Denoyel, and they relaunched the site under the name Sketchfab in March 2012. Pierre-Antoine Passet joined as CPO in September 2012.

=== Startup accelerators ===
The startup was part of the third batch of the French startup accelerator Le Camping in June 2012. It was later selected into Mozilla's WebFWD accelerator program during that same year. The year after, Sketchfab was selected in the Spring 2013 TechStars class in New York City.

=== Fundraising ===
In February 2013, Sketchfab raised an angel round of €370,000. Less than one year after, in December 2013, Sketchfab raised $2 million from Balderton Capital with Partech Ventures, Borealis Ventures, David Cohen and existing angel investors also participated in the funding. In June 2015, Sketchfab raised a $7 million Series A led by FirstMark Capital. In December 2018, Brendan Iribe, the original CEO and co-founder of Oculus, invested in Sketchfab.

=== Awards ===
- Top 8 at Pioneers Festival 2012
- Best “Lightweight” Startup, the Europas Awards 2013

== See also ==
- List of WebGL frameworks
- 3D printing marketplace
