= Threeding =

Online 3D printing marketplace

- Company type: Private
- Industry: 3D printing, e-commerce
- Founded: 2013; 13 years ago
- Founders: Stan Partalev, Cveta-Maria Partaleva, Tony Kittpov
- Area served: Worldwide
- Website: threeding.com

Threeding is an online marketplace and community for the exchange and sale of designs and templates related to 3D printing and modeling. The platform allows users to create personal storefronts where they can list and sell 3D-printable models to a global audience. It is one of several repositories within the 3D printing industry.

== History ==
Threeding was founded in 2013 by Stan Partalev, Cveta-Maria Partaleva, and Tony Kiitpov. Stan and Cveta-Maria, a brother-and-sister duo, were students at the National Academy of Art in Bulgaria when they came up with the idea for the platform. Their goal was to create a marketplace where users could easily exchange 3D-printable files and contribute to the growing 3D printing industry. The team's background in art and design helped them curate a collection of 3D models that attracted global interest.

Since its inception, Threeding has grown into a platform for exchanging 3D-printable models. It offers users the opportunity to set up personal storefronts and sell their designs to a global audience. As of 2024, the marketplace is home to over 15,000 models.

== 3D printing of cultural heritage ==
The marketplace has become well known for its partnerships with museums and cultural institutions across Eastern Europe which allow users to access 3D scans of historical artifacts. Several Eastern European historical and archaeological museums, including the Regional Museums of Varna and Pernik in Bulgaria, have entered into cooperation agreements with Threeding. Threeding creates 3D scans of museum exhibitions and artifacts from their permanent collections and the museums are able to sell these digital 3D scans through virtual stores. The available 3D printing models include historical artifacts and architectural features from prehistoric, ancient, medieval, and modern periods.

== See also ==
- 3D printing marketplace
- 3D printing
- 3D modeling
- STL (file format)
