= Materialise NV =

Belgian 3D printing company

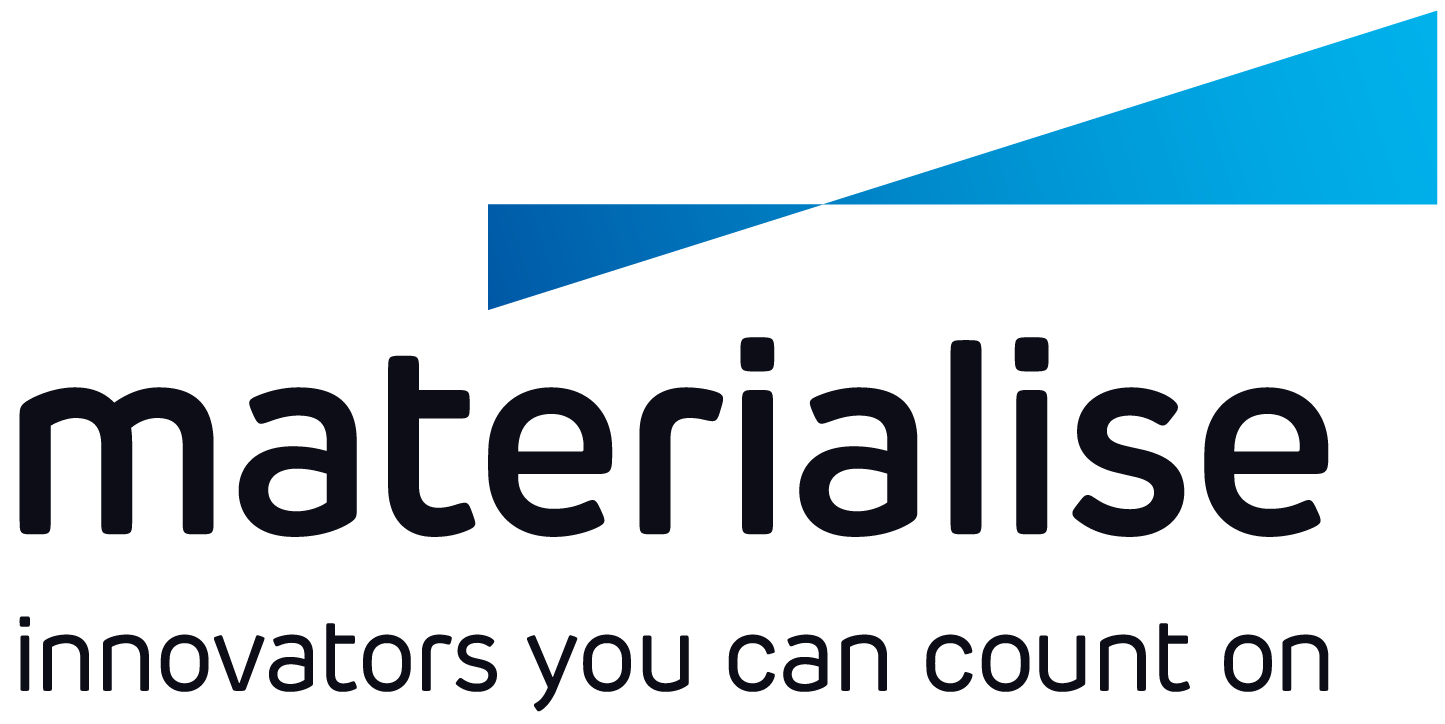
- Type: Public
- Traded as: Nasdaq: MTLS
- Industry: 3D Printing and Additive Manufacturing
- Founded: 1990; 36 years ago
- Founder: Wilfried Vancraen
- Headquarters: Leuven, Belgium
- Area served: Worldwide
- Revenue: ▲US$196.67 million (2019)
- Number of employees: 2000+
- Website: materialise.com

Materialise NV, headquartered in Leuven, Belgium, is a company in the 3D printing / additive manufacturing sector.

== History ==
=== 1990s ===
Materialise was founded in June 1990 by Wilfried Vancraen and his wife Hilde Ingelaere as a Rapid Prototyping service bureau. It was the first company of its kind in the Benelux region of Europe, through the acquisition of a single Stereolithography machine (the SLA 1).

In 1992, Materialise began mapping human anatomy digitally in three dimensions, using sliced CT image data, which lead to the development of its medical image processing software: Mimics. Concurrently, the team was also developing its industrial software solution, Magics. Both of these software solutions were later commercialized to promote growth.

In 1995, Materialise became the first company to produce 3D printed parts in more than one colour, specifically at this time for anatomical models produced using the stereolithography process to delineate the complexities of the anatomy (such as nerves, blood vessels and tumours) and allow surgeons to more precisely plan for operations.

The company developed and produced the first customised 3D printed surgical guide for a dental operation in 1996. These personalised guides were utilised during surgery to show surgeons bone cutting and drilling locations to apply implants. This knowledge was used to develop Materialise SimPlant software, allowing the surgeon to virtually plan the surgery and minimize invasive exploratory surgery.

The company launched one of the first 3D printing online ordering systems in 1997, Materialise NextDay, which later became Materialise OnSite. This service allowed 3D printing service customers to send digital 3D data, which could be printed and shipped the next day.

Demand for prototypes grew, leading Materialise to develop its Mammoth Stereolithography systems, which are capable of printing single-piece models with dimensions of more than 2 meters in the Y axis.

=== 2000s ===
In the year 2000, hearing aid specialist Phonak approached Materialise to develop the Rapid Shell Modeling (RSM) software. This allowed the design process for customized, patient-specific hearing aid shells to become automated. The resulting designs could then be 3D printed to produce the customised hearing aids. This was the first high volume, end-use application of 3D printing, and today, 99% of the world's hearing aids are now produced using 3D printing.

Materialise acquired US company Columbia Scientific Inc, (CSI) in 2001, the creators of Sim/Plant and ImageMaster, which became the US headquarters for Materialise's dental division in that region.

In 2003 Materialise launched one of the first 3D printed consumer brands — .MGX by Materialise — for 3D printing end-use products as well as prototypes. In parallel, the company also acquired Fused Deposition Modelling (FDM) systems for industrial applications.

The following year, in 2004, Materialise introduced its 3-matic software, allowing 3D printer users to edit files directly in the STL format. Previously, if design changes were required in the digital model, designers had to make them in the CAD suite of choice before re-converting the entire file to STL again.

In 2006 Materialise launched RapidFit, developed as a 3D printed solution for shipping large parts with customized jigs and fixtures to prevent deformation or breakage while in transit.

In 2006 Materialise developed the first Titanium 3D printed skull implants, following the acquisition of OBL, which specialized in the creation of custom cranio-maxillfacial (CMF) implants, producing customized implants with intricate porous structures, that behave like natural bone and mimic its mechanical and thermal properties.

In 2008 Materialise introduced the e-Stage software which was the first software to automatically generate support structures for different geometries in Stereolitography. In the same year, the company launched i.materialise for the consumer market, making it possible for anyone to print their ideas using professional-quality equipment. Materialise also developed its first Build Processor to support running different 3D printing processes more efficiently within a single location.

=== 2010s ===
In 2012, Materialise introduced Streamics to provide traceable quality control to industrial 3D printer users producing end-use parts within regulated industries.

Materialise went public on June 25, 2014 to enable expansion of its services and software development. The same year the company acquired OrthoView, a market leader in orthopaedic digital pre-operative planning software founded by Adrian Dwyer, John Chambers, and Peter Quinn, and officially established a new office in China in December with a focus on 3D printing Software and R&D, namely Materialise Shanghai Co. Ltd.

In 2016, the company opened a new and dedicated metal production facility in Bremen, Germany. Materialise HQ, Leuven, also acquired and started testing the multi jet fusion (MJF) process from HP. Production of parts with MJF started in the following year, 2017.

With the expansion of the AM Metal market, Materialise acquired ACTech in Germany to extend the company's metal capabilities, with a specific emphasis on low-volume production of highly complex metal parts. The acquisition also enabled Materialise to develop and improve its software suite for metal 3D printing.
