= Applications of 3D printing =

In recent years, 3D printing has developed significantly and can now perform crucial roles in many applications, with the most common applications being manufacturing, medicine, architecture, custom art and design, and can vary from fully functional to purely aesthetic applications. 3D printing processes are finally catching up to their full potential, and are currently being used in manufacturing and medical industries, as well as by sociocultural sectors which facilitate 3D printing for commercial purposes. There has been a lot of interest in the last decade when referring to the possibilities achievable by adopting 3D printing as one of the main manufacturing technologies. Utilizing this technology would replace traditional methods that can be costly and time-consuming. There have been case studies outlining how the customization abilities of 3D printing through modifiable files have been beneficial for cost and time effectiveness in a healthcare applications.

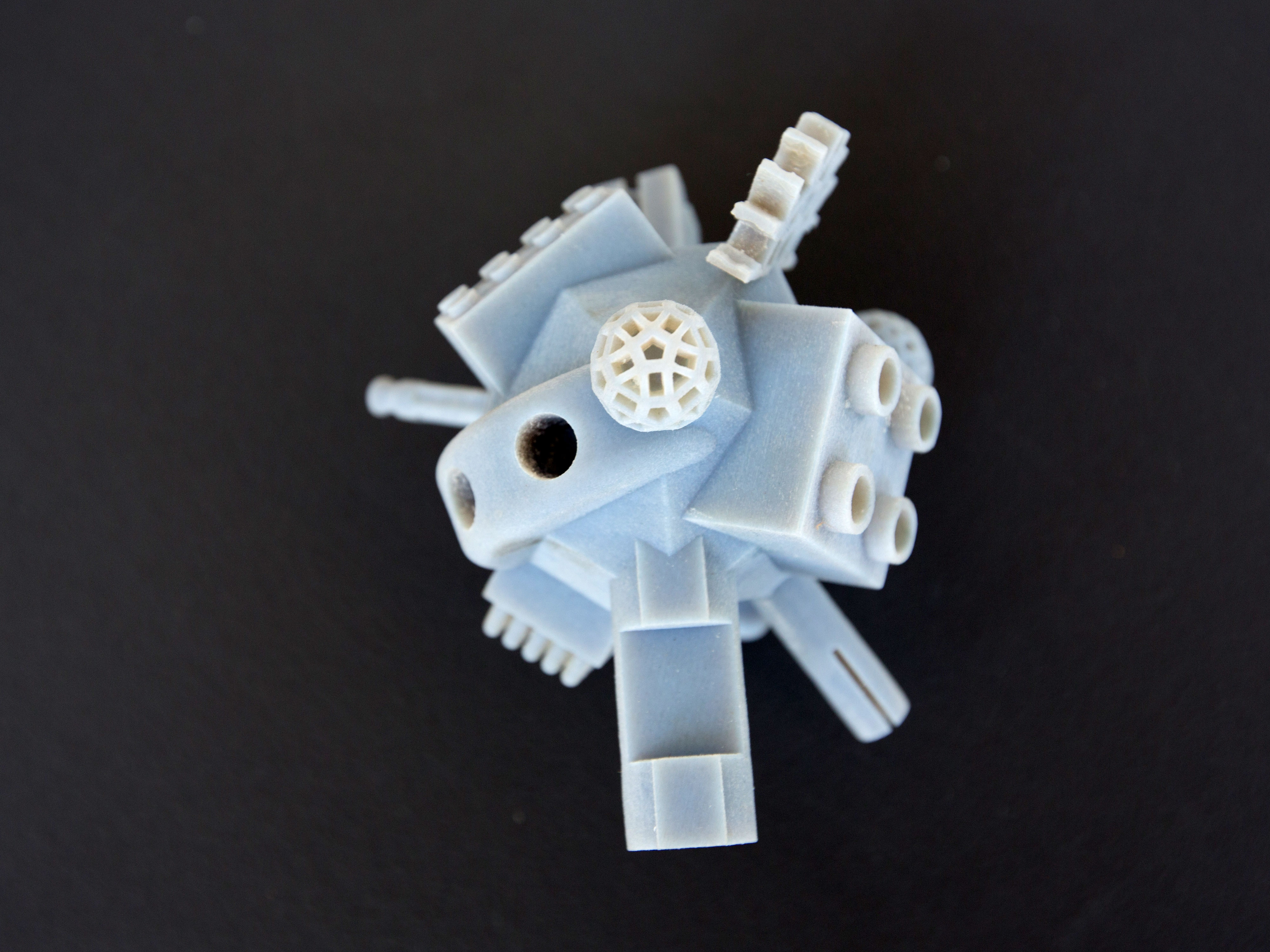
Free Universal Construction Kit

There are different types of 3D printing such as fused deposition modeling (FDM), stereolithography (SLA), selective laser sintering (SLS), polyjet printing, multi-jet fusion (MJF), direct metal laser sintering (DMLS), and electron beam melting (EBM). For a long time, the issue with 3D printing was that it has demanded very high entry costs, which does not allow profitable implementation to mass-manufacturers when compared to standard processes. However, this is changing, as the market for 3D printing has shown some of the quickest growth within the manufacturing industry in recent years. The applications of 3D printing are vast due to the ability to print complex pieces using a wide range of materials. Materials can range from plastic and polymers as thermoplastic filaments, to resins, and even stem cells.

== Manufacturing applications ==
Three-dimensional printing makes it as cheap to create single items as it is to produce thousands and thus undermines economies of scale. It may have as profound an impact on the world as the coming of the factory did (...) Just as nobody could have predicted the impact of the steam engine in 1750—or the printing press in 1450, or the transistor in 1950—it is impossible to foresee the long-term impact of 3D printing. But the technology is coming, and it is likely to disrupt every field it touches.

— The Economist, in a February 10, 2011 leader

Additive manufacturing (AM) technologies found applications starting in the 1980s in product development, data visualization, rapid prototyping, and specialized manufacturing. Their expansion into production (job production, mass production, and distributed manufacturing) has been under development in the decades since. Industrial production roles within the metalworking industries achieved significant scale for the first time in the early 2010s. Since the start of the 21st century there has been a large growth in the sales of AM machines, and their price has dropped substantially. According to Wohlers Associates, a consultancy, the market for 3D printers and services was worth $2.2 billion worldwide in 2012, up 29% from 2011. McKinsey predicts that additive manufacturing could have an economic impact of $550 billion annually by 2025. There are many applications for AM technologies, including architecture, construction (AEC), industrial design, automotive, aerospace, military, engineering, dental and medical industries, biotech (human tissue replacement), fashion, footwear, jewelry, eyewear, education, geographic information systems, food, and many other fields.

Additive manufacturing's earliest applications have been on the toolroom end of the manufacturing spectrum. For example, rapid prototyping was one of the earliest additive variants, and its mission was to reduce the lead time and cost of developing prototypes of new parts and devices, which was earlier only done with subtractive toolroom methods such as CNC milling and turning, and precision grinding, far more accurate than 3D printing with accuracy down to 0.00005" and creating better quality parts faster, but sometimes too expensive for low accuracy prototype parts. With technological advances in additive manufacturing, however, and the dissemination of those advances into the business world, additive methods are moving ever further into the production end of manufacturing in creative and sometimes unexpected ways. Parts that were formerly the sole province of subtractive methods can now in some cases be made more profitably via additive ones. In addition, new developments in RepRap technology allow the same device to perform both additive and subtractive manufacturing by swapping magnetic-mounted tool heads.

=== Cloud-based additive manufacturing ===
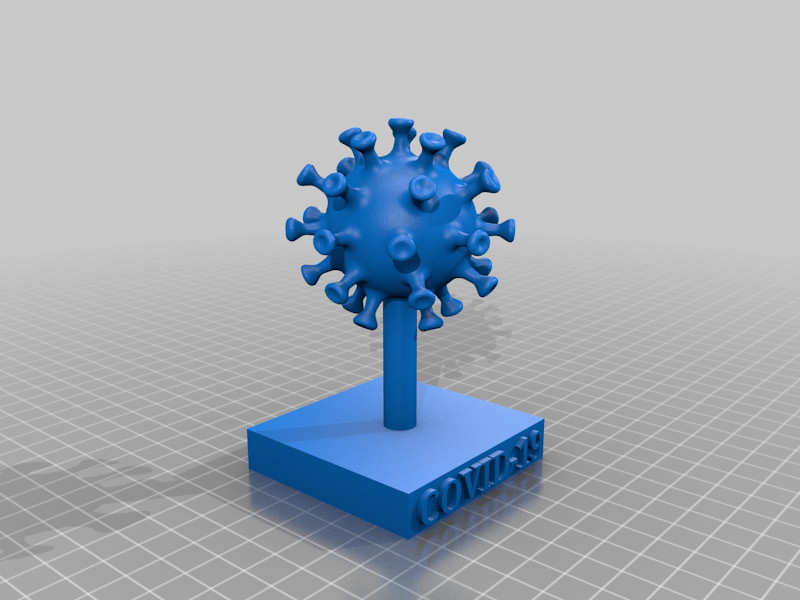
Example of an open source downloadable STL model

Additive manufacturing in combination with cloud computing technologies allows decentralized and geographically independent distributed production. Cloud-based additive manufacturing refers to a service-oriented networked manufacturing model in which service consumers are able to build parts through Infrastructure-as-a-Service (IaaS), Platform-as-a-Service (PaaS), Hardware-as-a-Service (HaaS), and Software-as-a-Service (SaaS). Distributed manufacturing as such is carried out by some enterprises; there are also services like 3D Hubs that put people needing 3D printing in contact with owners of printers.

Some companies offer online 3D printing services to both commercial and private customers, working from 3D designs uploaded to the company website. 3D-printed designs are either shipped to the customer or picked up from the service provider.

There are many open source websites that have downloadable STL files which are able to be modified or printed as is. Files ranging from functional tools to aesthetic figurines are available to the general public. Open source files can be beneficial for the user as the printed object can be more cost effective than commercial counterparts.

=== Mass customization ===
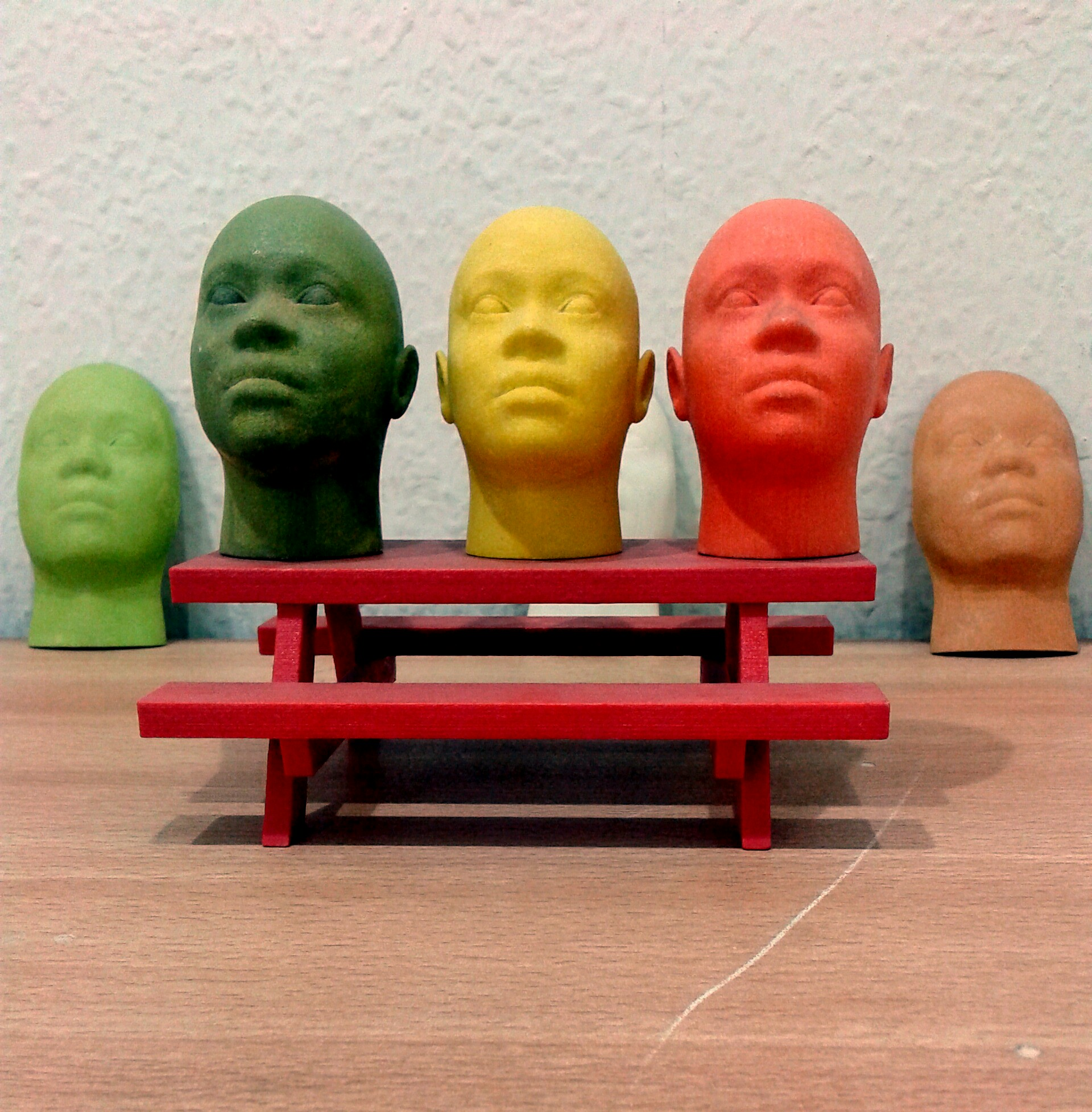
Miniature face models (from FaceGen) produced using Ceramic Based material on a Full Colour 3D Inkjet Printer

Companies have created services where consumers can customize objects using simplified web based customization software, and order the resulting items as 3D printed unique objects. This now allows consumers to create things like custom cases for their mobile phones or scans of their brains. Nokia has released the 3D designs for its case so that owners can customize their own case and have it 3D printed.

=== Rapid manufacturing ===
Advances in RP technology have introduced materials that are appropriate for final manufacture, which has in turn introduced the possibility of directly manufacturing finished components. One advantage of 3D printing for rapid manufacturing lies in the relatively quick and inexpensive production of small numbers of parts.

Rapid manufacturing is a new method of manufacturing and many of its processes remain unproven. 3D printing is now entering the field of rapid manufacturing and was identified as a "next level" technology by many experts in a 2009 report. One of the most promising processes looks to be the adaptation of selective laser sintering (SLS), or direct metal laser sintering (DMLS) some of the better-established rapid prototyping methods. As of 2006, however, these techniques were still very much in their infancy, with many obstacles to be overcome before RM could be considered a realistic manufacturing method.

There have been patent lawsuits concerning 3-D printing for manufacturing.

=== Rapid prototyping ===
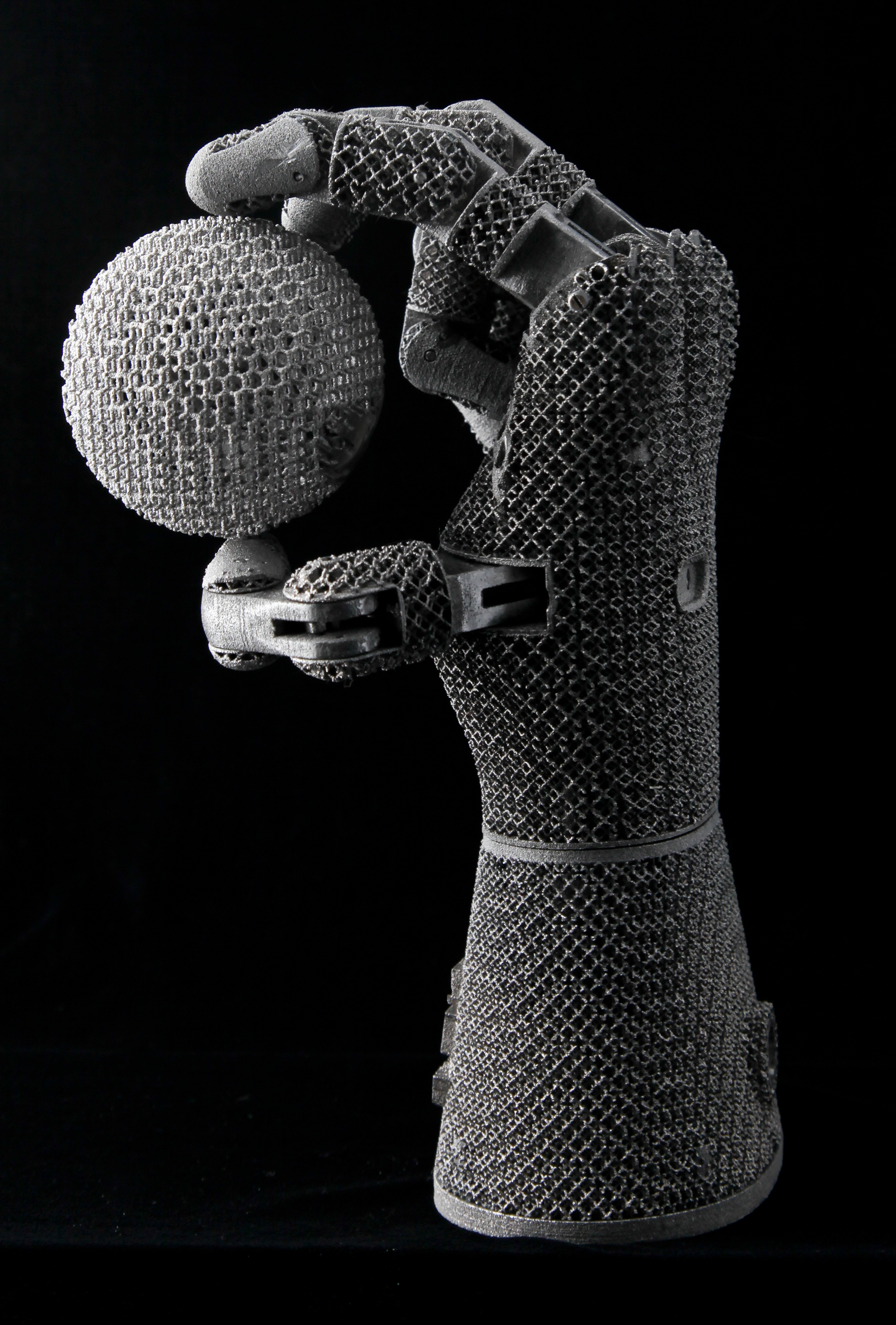
printed object

Industrial 3D printers have existed since the early 1980s and have been used extensively for rapid prototyping and research purposes. These are generally larger machines that use proprietary powdered metals, casting media (e.g. sand), plastics, paper or cartridges, and are used for rapid prototyping by universities and commercial companies.

=== Research ===
3D printing can be particularly useful in research labs due to its ability to make specialized, bespoke geometries. In 2012 a proof of principle project at the University of Glasgow, UK, showed that it is possible to use 3D printing techniques to assist in the production of chemical compounds. They first printed chemical reaction vessels, then used the printer to deposit reactants into them. They have produced new compounds to verify the validity of the process, but have not pursued anything with a particular application.

Usually, the FDM process is used to print hollow reaction vessels or microreactors. If the 3D print is performed within an inert gas atmosphere, the reaction vessels can be filled with highly reactive substances during the print. The 3D printed objects are air- and watertight for several weeks. By the print of reaction vessels in the geometry of common cuvettes or measurement tubes, routine analytical measurements such as UV/VIS-, IR- and NMR-spectroscopy can be performed directly in the 3D printed vessel.

In addition, 3D printing has been used in research labs as alternative method to manufacture components for use in experiments, such as magnetic shielding and vacuum components with demonstrated performance comparable to traditionally produced parts.

=== Food ===
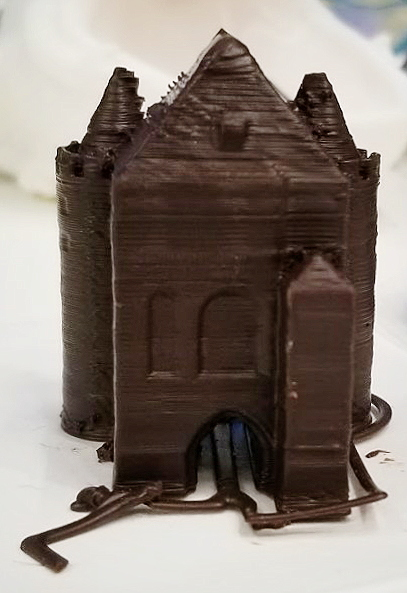
3D printed chocolate

Additive manufacturing of food is being developed by squeezing out food, layer by layer, into three-dimensional objects. A large variety of foods are appropriate candidates, such as chocolate and candy, and flat foods such as crackers, pasta, and pizza. NASA has considered the versatility of the concept, awarding a contract to the Systems and Materials Research Consultancy to study the feasibility of printing food in space. NASA is also looking into the technology in order to create 3D printed food to limit food waste and to make food that are designed to fit an astronaut's dietary needs. A food-tech startup Novameat from Barcelona 3D-printed a steak from peas, rice, seaweed, and some other ingredients that were laid down criss-cross, imitating the intracellular proteins. One of the problems with food printing is the nature of the texture of a food. For example, foods that are not strong enough to be filed are not appropriate for 3D printing.

=== Agile tooling ===
Agile tooling is the process of using modular means to design tooling that is produced by additive manufacturing or 3D printing methods to enable quick prototyping and responses to tooling and fixture needs. Agile tooling uses a cost-effective and high-quality method to quickly respond to customer and market needs. It can be used in hydro-forming, stamping, injection molding and other manufacturing processes.

== Medical applications ==
3D printing is used to create organ models for practice surgery applications, patient-specific joint replacements in orthopedic surgery, biodegradable medical scaffolds for tissue engineering, pharmaceutical formulations, and personal protective equipment. Successful cases include 3D-printed titanium implants, facial reconstruction surgeries, and patient-specific hearing aids and dental devices. Surgeons have also utilized 3D-printed organ replicas to prepare for complex procedures like pediatric kidney transplants, and models of patients' nerve clusters to diagnose damaged nerves. Beyond surgical applications, 3D printing contributes to protective equipment production, rapid prototyping, and pharmaceutical advancements, such as creating personalized medication. Hospitals are printing implants, tissue scaffolds, and replica organ models onsite with dedicated 3D printing laboratories. This approach enables on-demand, decentralized manufacturing of medical products.

=== Anatomical models ===
Surgical uses of 3D printing-centric therapies have a history beginning in the mid-1990s with anatomical modeling for bony reconstructive surgery planning. By practicing on a tactile model before surgery, surgeons were more prepared and patients received better care. Patient-matched implants were a natural extension of this work, leading to truly personalized implants that fit one unique individual. Virtual planning of surgery and guidance using 3D printed, personalized instruments have been applied to many areas of surgery including total joint replacement and craniomaxillofacial reconstruction with great success. Further study of the use of models for planning heart and solid organ surgery has led to increased use in these areas.

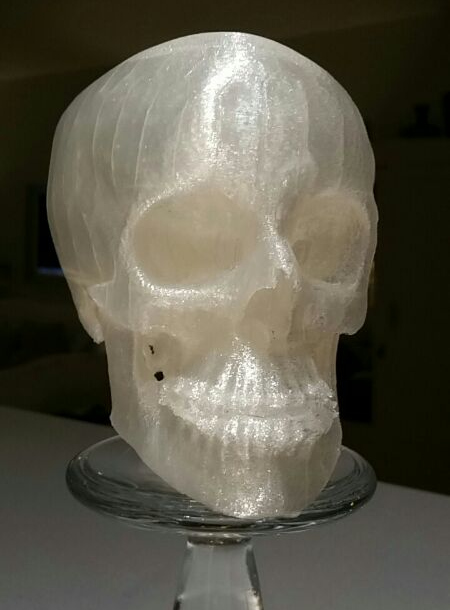
3D printed human skull from computed computer tomography data

3D printing technology can now be used to make exact replicas of organs. The printer uses images from patients' MRI or CT scan images as a template and lays down layers of rubber or plastic. These models can be used to plan difficult operations, as was the case in May 2018, when surgeons used a 3D printed replica of a kidney to practice a kidney transplant on a three-year-old boy.

=== Implants ===
3D printing has been used to print patient-specific implant and device for medical use. Successful operations include a titanium pelvis implanted into a British patient, titanium lower jaw transplanted to a Dutch patient, and a plastic tracheal splint for an American infant. Implants can be made from biocompatible materials, including titanium, stainless steel, PEEK (Polyether Ether Ketone), Nitinol (a nickel-titanium alloy), and silicon nitride ceramics. The hearing aid and dental industries are expected to be the biggest areas of future development using custom 3D printing technology. In March 2014, surgeons in Swansea used 3D printed parts to rebuild the face of a motorcyclist who had been seriously injured in a road accident. Research is also being conducted on methods to bio-print replacements for lost tissue due to arthritis and cancer.

3D Printing has been especially beneficial for the creation of patient specific prosthetics for large or invasive surgeries. In a case study published in 2020 about the benefits of 3D printing for hip prostheses, three patients with acetabular defects needed revisions of total hip arthroplasty (THA). 3D printing was utilized to produce prostheses that were specific to each of the three patients and their complex bone defect, which resulted in better post procedure recovery and prognosis of the individual.

The technology is being used to create unique, patient-matched devices for rare illnesses. One example of this is the bioresorbable trachial splint to treat newborns with tracheobronchomalacia developed at the University of Michigan. Several devices manufacturers have also begun using 3D printing for patient-matched surgical guides (polymers). The use of additive manufacturing for serialized production of orthopedic implants (metals) is also increasing due to the ability to efficiently create porous surface structures that facilitate osseointegration. Printed casts for broken bones can be custom-fitted and open, letting the wearer scratch any itches, wash and ventilate the damaged area. They can also be recycled.

In February 2015, FDA approved the marketing of a surgical bolt which facilitates less-invasive foot surgery and eliminates the need to drill through bone. The 3D printed titanium device, 'FastForward Bone Tether Plate' is approved to use in correction surgery to treat bunion. In October 2015, the group of Professor Andreas Herrmann at the University of Groningen has developed the first 3D printable resins with antimicrobial properties. Employing stereolithography, quaternary ammonium groups are incorporated into dental appliances that kill bacteria on contact. This type of material can be further applied in medical devices and implants.

Hospital for Special Surgery became the first hospital to have an on-site additive manufacturing facility. In 2019, Hospital for Special Surgery partnered with orthopedic device maker LimaCorporate to open the provider-based facility. The facility opened in 2021, printing personalized titanium joint replacements in complex cases of severe deformities or patients with extensive bone loss. Dr. Robert Buly at the Hospital for Special Surgery performed the first hip replacement using a patient-specific implant manufactured on-site, while Dr. Patrick Connor at the OrthoCarolina Center performed the first shoulder replacement using the same technology.

A 2021 clinical study compared the early outcomes of three-dimensional-printed porous titanium cages with polyetheretherketone (PEEK) cages in stand-alone lateral lumbar interbody fusion procedures. The results of the study indicated that titanium cages were associated with lower rates of implant subsidence and greater improvements in back pain and disc height restoration.

=== Prosthetics ===
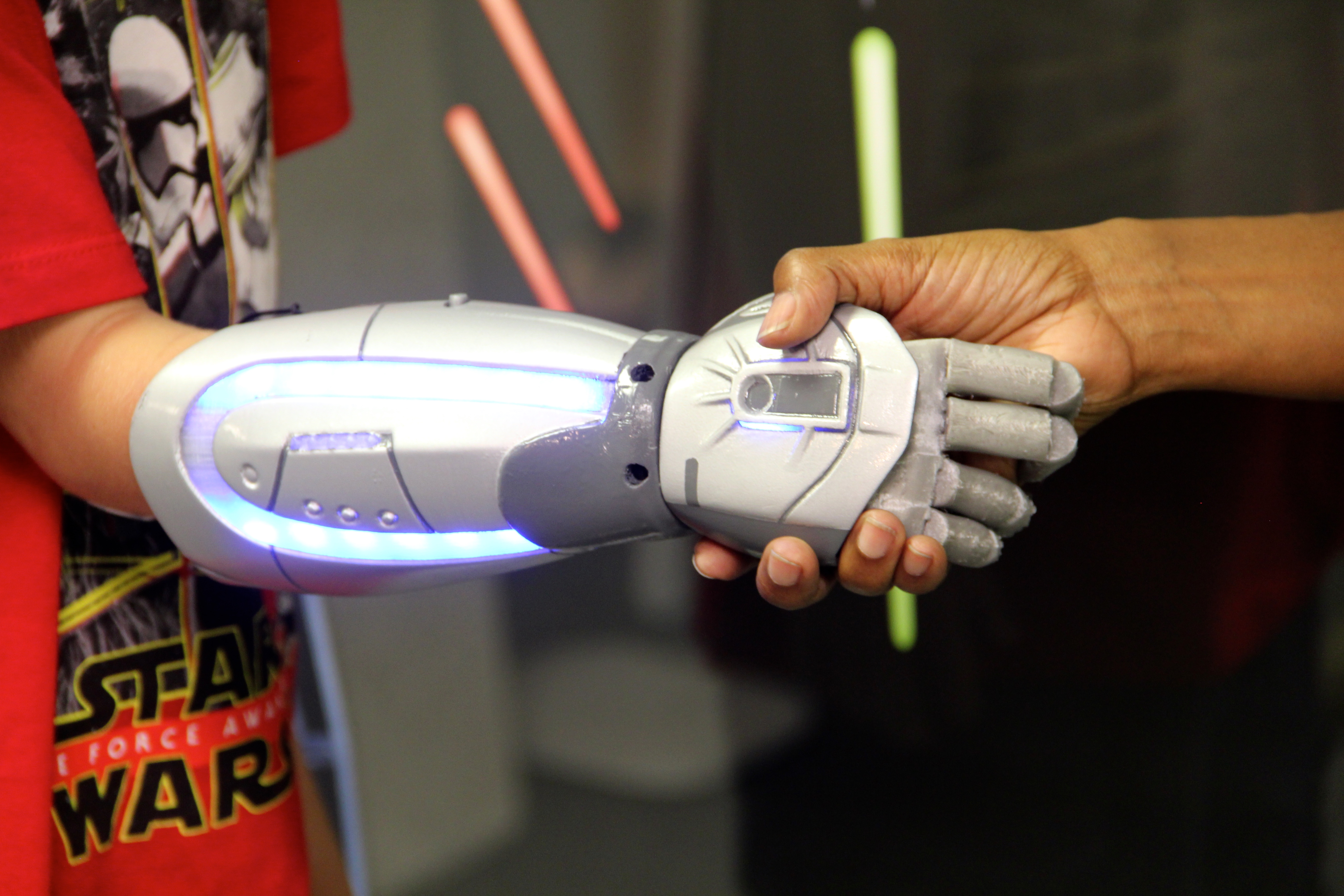
Star Wars themed "Hero Arm" from Open Bionics.

On October 24, 2014, a five-year-old girl born without fully formed fingers on her left hand became the first child in the UK to have a prosthetic hand made with 3D printing technology. Her hand was designed by US-based e-NABLE, an open source design organisation which uses a network of volunteers to design and make prosthetics mainly for children. The prosthetic hand was based on a plaster cast made by her parents. A boy named Alex was also born with a missing arm from just above the elbow. The team was able to use 3D printing to upload an e-NABLE Myoelectric arm that runs off of servos and batteries that are actuated by the electromyography muscle. With the use of 3D printers, e-NABLE has so far distributed thousands of plastic hands to children. Another example is Open Bionics, a company that makes fully functional bionic arms through 3D printing technology. 3D printing allows Open Bionics to create personalized designs for their clients, as there can be different colours, textures, patterns, and even "Hero Arms" that emulate superheroes like Ironman or characters from Star Wars.

3D printing for medical devices can range from human prosthetics applications, to animal prostheses, to medical machine tools: On June 6, 2011, the company Xilloc Medical together with researchers at the University of Hasselt, in Belgium had successfully printed a new jawbone for an 83-year-old Dutch woman from the province of Limburg. 3D printing has been used to produce prosthetic beaks for eagles, a Brazilian goose named Victoria, and a Costa Rican toucan called Grecia.

=== Bio-printing ===
Fused deposition modeling (FDM) has been used to create microstructures with a three-dimensional internal geometry. Sacrificial structures or additional support materials are not needed. Structures using polylactic acid (PLA) can have fully controllable porosity in the range 20%–60%. Such scaffolds could serve as biomedical templates for cell culturing, or biodegradable implants for tissue engineering.

In 2006, researchers at Cornell University published some of the pioneer work in 3D printing for tissue fabrication, successfully printing hydrogel bio-inks. The work at Cornell was expanded using specialized bioprinters produced by Seraph Robotics, Inc., a university spin-out, which helped to catalyze a global interest in biomedical 3D printing research.

3D printing has been considered as a method of implanting stem cells capable of generating new tissues and organs in living humans. With their ability to transform into any other kind of cell in the human body, stem cells offer huge potential in 3D bioprinting. Professor Leroy Cronin of Glasgow University proposed in a 2012 TED Talk that it was possible to use chemical inks to print medicine. In 2015 the FDA approved Spritam ®, a 3D printed drug also known as levetiracetam. Currently, there are three methods of 3D printing that have been explored for the production of drug making: aser based writing systems, printing-based inkjet systems, and nozzle based systems.

In 3D printing, computer-simulated microstructures are commonly used to fabricate objects with spatially varying properties. This is achieved by dividing the volume of the desired object into smaller subcells using computer aided simulation tools and then filling these cells with appropriate microstructures during fabrication. Several different candidate structures with similar behaviours are checked against each other and the object is fabricated when an optimal set of structures is found. Advanced topology optimization methods are used to ensure the compatibility of structures in adjacent cells. This flexible approach to 3D fabrication is widely used across various disciplines from biomedical scienceswhere they are used to create complex bone structures and human tissue to robotics where they are used in the creation of soft robots with movable parts. 3D printing also finds its uses more and more in design and fabrication of laboratory apparatus.

As of 2012, 3D bio-printing technology has been studied by biotechnology firms and academia for possible use in tissue engineering applications in which organs and body parts are built using inkjet techniques. In this process, layers of living cells are deposited onto a gel medium or sugar matrix and slowly built up to form three-dimensional structures including vascular systems. The first production system for 3D tissue printing was delivered in 2009, based on NovoGen bioprinting technology. Several terms have been used to refer to this field of research: organ printing, bio-printing, body part printing, and computer-aided tissue engineering, among others. The possibility of using 3D tissue printing to create soft tissue architectures for reconstructive surgery is also being explored.

In 2013, Chinese scientists began printing ears, livers and kidneys, with living tissue. Researchers in China have been able to successfully print human organs using specialized 3D bioprinters that use living cells instead of plastic. Researchers at Hangzhou Dianzi University designed the "3D bioprinter" dubbed the "Regenovo". Xu Mingen, Regenovo's developer, said that it can produce a miniature sample of liver tissue or ear cartilage in less than an hour, predicting that fully functional printed organs might take 10 to 20 years to develop.

In 2025, Czech scientists report "the development of a disposable and compact fully 3D-printed electrochemical cell incorporated into a medical scalpel."

Thermal degradation during 3D printing of resorbable polymers, same as in surgical sutures, has been studied, and parameters can be adjusted to minimize the degradation during processing. Soft pliable scaffold structures for cell cultures can be printed.

To advance the adaptation of biomedical 3D printing, several studies explored in-hospital 3D printing for radiology departments.

=== Pharmaceutical formulations ===
In May 2015 the first formulation manufactured by 3D printing was produced. In August 2015 the FDA approved the first 3D printed tablet. Binder-jetting into a powder bed of the drug allows very porous tablets to be produced, which enables high drug doses in a single formulation that rapidly dissolves and is easily absorbed. This has been demonstrated for Spritam, a reformulation of levetiracetam for the treatment of epilepsy.

Nowadays, Additive Manufacturing is also employed in the field of pharmaceutical sciences to create 3D printed medication. Different techniques of 3D printing (e.g. FDM, SLS, Inkjet Printing etc.) are utilized according to their respective advantages and drawbacks for various applications regarding drug delivery. Additive Manufacturing has been increasingly utilized by scientists in the pharmaceutical field. However, after the first FDA approval of a 3D printed formulation, scientific interest for 3D applications in drug delivery grew even bigger. Research groups around the world are studying different ways of incorporating drugs within a 3D printed formulation, for example by incorporating poorly water-soluble drugs in self-emulsifying systems or emulsion gels. 3D printing technology allows scientists to develop formulations with a personalized approach, i.e. dosage forms tailored specifically to an individual patient. Moreover, according to the advantages of the diverse utilized techniques, formulations with various properties can be achieved. These may contain multiple drugs in a single dosage form, multi-compartmental designs, drug delivery systems with distinct release characteristics, etc. During the earlier years, researchers have mainly focused on the Fused Deposition Modelling (FDM) technique. Nowadays, other printing techniques such as Selective Laser Sintering (SLS), Stereolithography (SLA) and Semi-solid extrusion (SSE) are also gaining traction and are being used for pharmaceutical applications.

=== Other medical applications ===
3D printing technology can also be used to produce personal protective equipment, also known as PPE, is worn by medical and laboratory professionals to protect themselves from infection when they are treating patients. Examples of PPE include face masks, face shields, connectors, gowns, and goggles. The most popular forms of 3D printed PPE are face masks, face shields, and connectors. In March 2020, the Isinnova company in Italy printed 100 respirator valves in 24 hours for a hospital that lacked them in the midst of the coronavirus outbreak.

In a case study about the applications of 3D printing in occupational therapy, the aspect of customization and quick fabrication at a low cost is utilized in different tools such as customized scissor handles and bottle openers for someone with hand motor complications. Beverage holders, writing guides, grip strengtheners, and other occupational therapy items were designed, printed, and compared with commercially available counterparts in a cost analysis. It found that the 3D printed items were on average 10.5 times more cost effective than commercial alternatives.

Printed prosthetics have been used in rehabilitation of crippled animals. In 2013, a 3D printed foot let a crippled duckling walk again. 3D printed hermit crab shells let hermit crabs inhabit a new style home. A prosthetic beak was another tool developed by the use of 3D printing to help aid a bald eagle named Beauty, whose beak was severely mutilated from a shot in the face. Since 2014, commercially available titanium knee implants made with 3D printer for dogs have been used to restore the animals' mobility. Over 10,000 dogs in Europe and the United States have been treated after only one year.

=== Regulations ===
Food and Drug Administration (FDA) does not regulate 3D printers. The FDA regulates the medical device manufacturer, the manufacturing process, and the printers' output if the output is a medical device.

== Industrial applications ==
=== Apparel ===
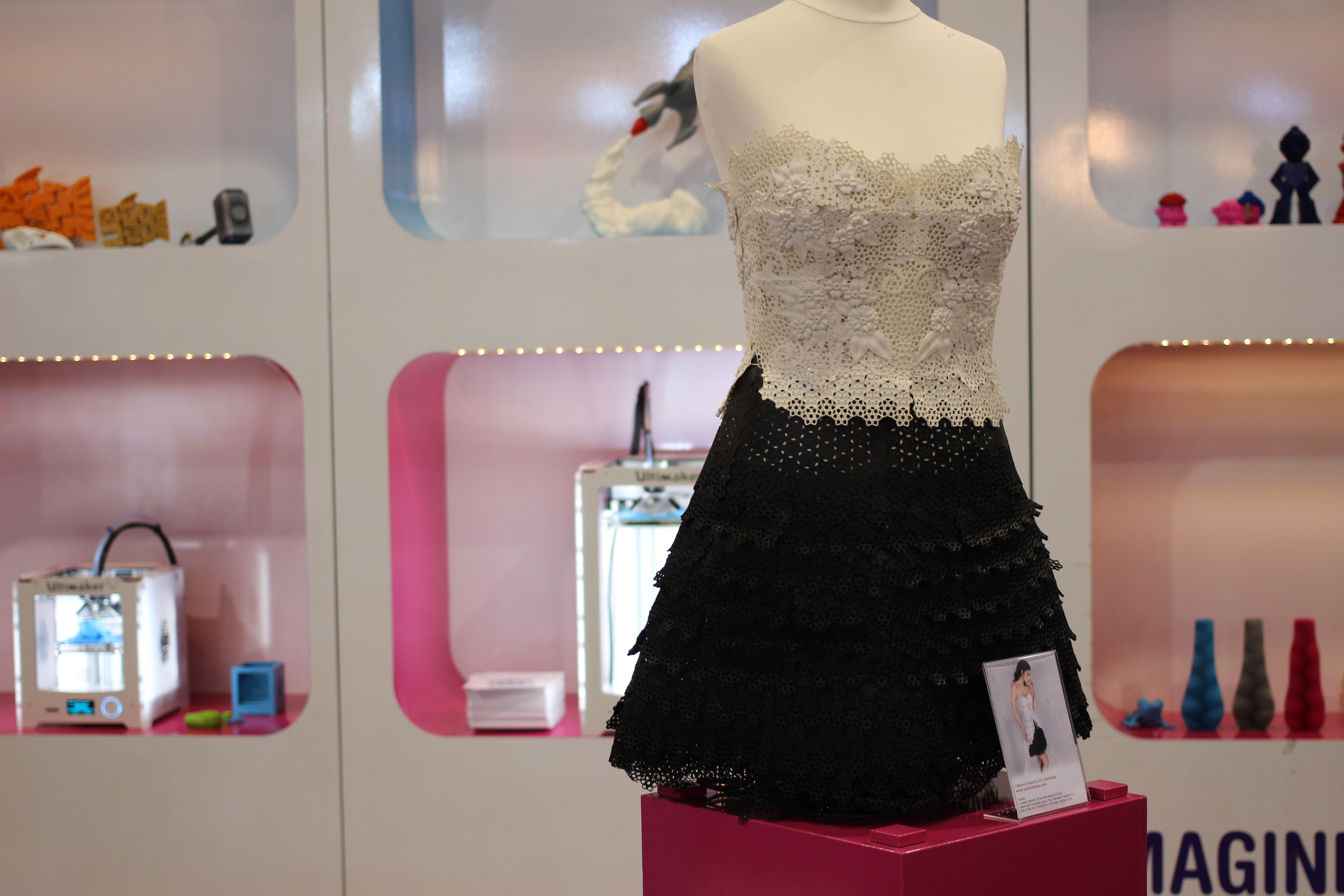
inBloom 3D printed outfit

3D printing has entered the world of clothing with fashion designers experimenting with 3D-printed bikinis, shoes, and dresses. In commercial production, Nike used 3D printing to prototype and manufacture the 2012 Vapor Laser Talon football shoe for players of American football, and New Balance is 3D manufacturing custom-fit shoes for athletes.

3D printing has come to the point where companies are printing consumer grade eyewear with on-demand custom fit and styling (although they cannot print the lenses). On-demand customization of glasses is possible with rapid prototyping.

However, comments have been made in academic circles as to the potential limitation of the human acceptance of such mass customized apparel items due to the potential reduction of brand value communication.

In the world of high fashion courtiers such as Karl Lagerfeld designing for Chanel, Iris van Herpen and Noa Raviv working with technology from Stratasys, have employed and featured 3d printing in their collections. Selections from their lines and other working with 3d printing were showcased at the 2016 Metropolitan Museum of Art Anna Wintour Costume Center, exhibition "Manus X Machina".

Vanessa Friedman, fashion director and chief fashion critic at The New York Times, says 3D printing will have a significant value for fashion companies down the road, especially if it transforms into a print-it-yourself tool for shoppers. "There's real sense that this is not going to happen anytime soon," she says, "but it will happen, and it will create dramatic change in how we think both about intellectual property and how things are in the supply chain". She adds: "Certainly some of the fabrications that brands can use will be dramatically changed by technology."

During the COVID-19 pandemic, the Ukrainian-American undergraduate Karina Popovich founded Markers for COVID-19 which used 3D printing to create face shields, face masks and other items of personal protective equipment.

=== Industrial art and jewelry ===
3D printing is used to manufacture moulds for making jewelry, and even the jewelry itself. 3D printing is becoming popular in the customisable gifts industry, with products such as personalized models of art and dolls, in many shapes: in metal or plastic, or as consumable art, such as 3D printed chocolate.

=== Transportation Industries ===
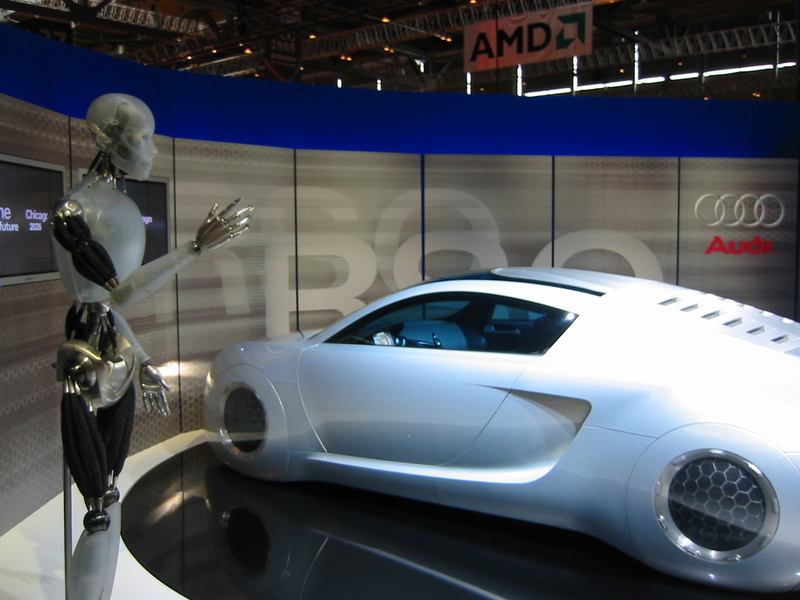
The Audi RSQ was made with rapid prototyping industrial KUKA robots.

In cars, trucks, and aircraft, additive manufacturing is beginning to transform both unibody and fuselage design and production, and powertrain design and production. For example, General Electric uses high-end 3D printers to build parts for turbines. Many of these systems are used for rapid prototyping before mass production methods are employed.

In early 2014, Swedish sports car manufacturer Koenigsegg announced the One:1, a sports car that utilizes many components that were 3D printed. In the limited run of vehicles Koenigsegg produces, the One:1 has side-mirror internals, air ducts, titanium exhaust components, and complete turbocharger assemblies that were 3D printed as part of the manufacturing process.

Urbee is the name of the first car in the world car mounted using the technology 3D printing (its bodywork and car windows were "printed"). Created in 2010 through the partnership between the US engineering group Kor Ecologic and the company Stratasys (manufacturer of printers Stratasys 3D), it is a hybrid vehicle with futuristic look.

In 2014, Local Motors debuted Strati, a functioning vehicle that was entirely 3D Printed using ABS plastic and carbon fiber, except the powertrain. In 2015, the company produced another iteration known as the LM3D Swim that was 80 percent 3D-printed. In 2016, the company has used 3D printing in the creation of automotive parts, such ones used in Olli, a self-driving vehicle developed by the company.

In May 2015 Airbus announced that its new Airbus A350 XWB included over 1000 components manufactured by 3D printing.

3D printing is also being utilized by air forces to print spare parts for planes. In 2015, a Royal Air Force Eurofighter Typhoon fighter jet flew with printed parts. The United States Air Force has begun to work with 3D printers, and the Israeli Air Force has also purchased a 3D printer to print spare parts.

In 2017, GE Aviation revealed that it had used design for additive manufacturing to create a helicopter engine with 16 parts instead of 900, weighing 40% lighter and being 60% cheaper. This also led to a simplified supply chain with less support from outer suppliers, as many of the parts could be produced in-house.

=== Construction, home development ===
The use of 3D printing to produce scale models within architecture and construction has steadily increased in popularity as the cost of 3D printers has reduced. This has enabled faster turn around of such scale models and allowed a steady increase in the speed of production and the complexity of the objects being produced.

Construction 3D printing, the application of 3D printing to fabricate construction components or entire buildings has been in development since the mid-1990s, development of new technologies has steadily gained pace since 2012 and the sub-sector of 3D printing is beginning to mature.

=== Firearms ===
In 2012, the US-based group Defense Distributed disclosed plans to "design a working plastic gun that could be downloaded and reproduced by anybody with a 3D printer." Defense Distributed has also designed a 3D printable AR-15 type rifle lower receiver (capable of lasting more than 650 rounds) and a 30-round M16 magazine. The AR-15 has multiple receivers (both an upper and lower receiver), but the legally controlled part is the one that is serialized (the lower, in the AR-15's case). Soon after Defense Distributed succeeded in designing the first working blueprint to produce a plastic gun with a 3D printer in May 2013, the United States Department of State demanded that they remove the instructions from their website. After Defense Distributed released their plans, questions were raised regarding the effects that 3D printing and widespread consumer-level CNC machining may have on gun control effectiveness.

In 2014, a man from Japan became the first person in the world to be imprisoned for making 3D printed firearms. Yoshitomo Imura posted videos and blueprints of the gun online and was sentenced to jail for two years. Police found at least two guns in his household that were capable of firing bullets.

=== Computers and robots ===
3D printing can also be used to make laptops and other computers and cases. For example, Novena and VIA OpenBook standard laptop cases. I.e. a Novena motherboard can be bought and be used in a printed VIA OpenBook case.

Open-source robots are built using 3D printers. Double Robotics grant access to their technology (an open SDK). On the other hand, 3&DBot is an Arduino 3D printer-robot with wheels and ODOI is a 3D printed humanoid robot.

=== Soft sensors and actuators ===
3D printing has found its place in soft sensors and actuators manufacturing inspired by 4D printing concept. The majority of the conventional soft sensors and actuators are fabricated using multistep low yield processes entailing manual fabrication, post-processing/assembly, and lengthy iterations with less flexibility in customization and reproducibility of final products. 3D printing has been a game changer in these fields with introducing the custom geometrical, functional, and control properties to avoid the tedious and time-consuming aspects of the earlier fabrication processes.

== Sociocultural applications ==
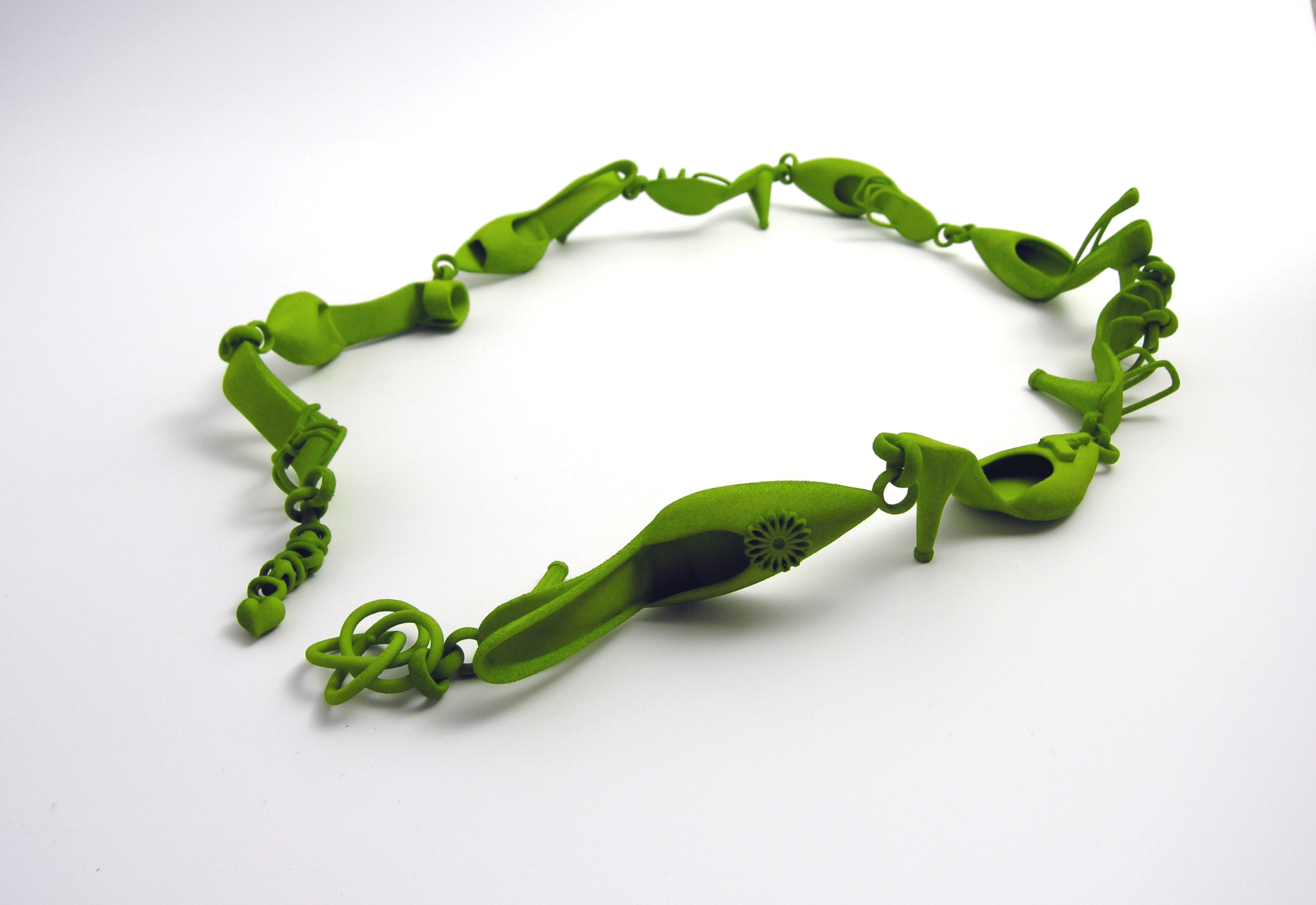
An example of 3D printed jewellery. This necklace is made of glassfiber-filled dyed nylon. It has rotating linkages that were produced in the same manufacturing step as the other parts

In 2005, a rapidly expanding hobbyist and home-use market was established with the inauguration of the open-source RepRap and Fab@Home projects. Virtually all home-use 3D printers released to-date have their technical roots in the ongoing RepRap Project and associated open-source software initiatives. In distributed manufacturing, one study has found that 3D printing could become a mass market product enabling consumers to save money associated with purchasing common household objects. For example, instead of going to a store to buy an object made in a factory by injection molding (such as a measuring cup or a funnel), a person might instead print it at home from a downloaded 3D model.

=== Art and jewellery ===
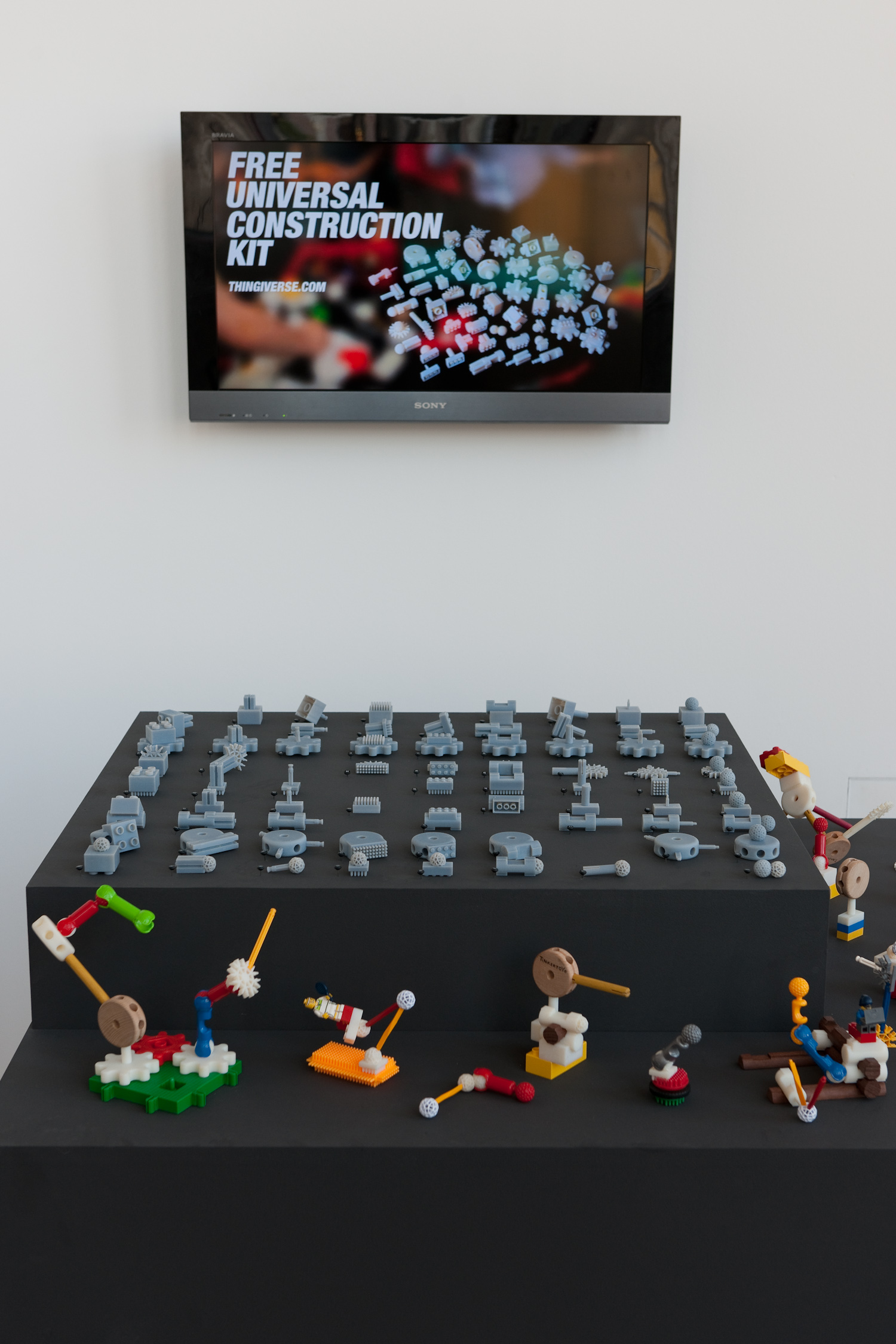
Free Universal Construction Kit by Levin and Shawn Sims, Ars Electronica, Offenes Kulturhaus museum, Linz (2012)

In 2005, academic journals began to report on the possible artistic applications of 3D printing technology, being used by artists such as Martin John Callanan at The Bartlett school of architecture. By 2007 the mass media followed with an article in the Wall Street Journal and Time magazine, listing a printed design among their 100 most influential designs of the year. During the 2011 London Design Festival, an installation, curated by Murray Moss and focused on 3D Printing, was held in the Victoria and Albert Museum (the V&A). The installation was called Industrial Revolution 2.0: How the Material World will Newly Materialize.

At the 3DPrintshow in London, which took place in November 2013 and 2014, the art sections had works made with 3D printed plastic and metal. Several artists such as Joshua Harker, Davide Prete, Sophie Kahn, Helena Lukasova, Foteini Setaki showed how 3D printing can modify aesthetic and art processes. In 2015, engineers and designers at MIT's Mediated Matter Group and Glass Lab created an additive 3D printer that prints with glass, called G3DP. The results can be structural as well as artistic. Transparent glass vessels printed on it are part of some museum collections.

The use of 3D scanning technologies allows the replication of real objects without the use of moulding techniques that in many cases can be more expensive, more difficult, or too invasive to be performed, particularly for precious artwork or delicate cultural heritage artifacts where direct contact with the moulding substances could harm the original object's surface.

A collection of 3D-printable adapters for popular toy construction systems called the Free Universal Construction Kit (2012) is in the collection of the Museum of Modern Art in New York. The work, by Golan Levin and Shawn Sims, was also included in Pirouette: Turning Points in Design, the museum's 2025 exhibition featuring "widely recognized design icons [...] highlighting pivotal moments in design history."

=== 3D selfies ===
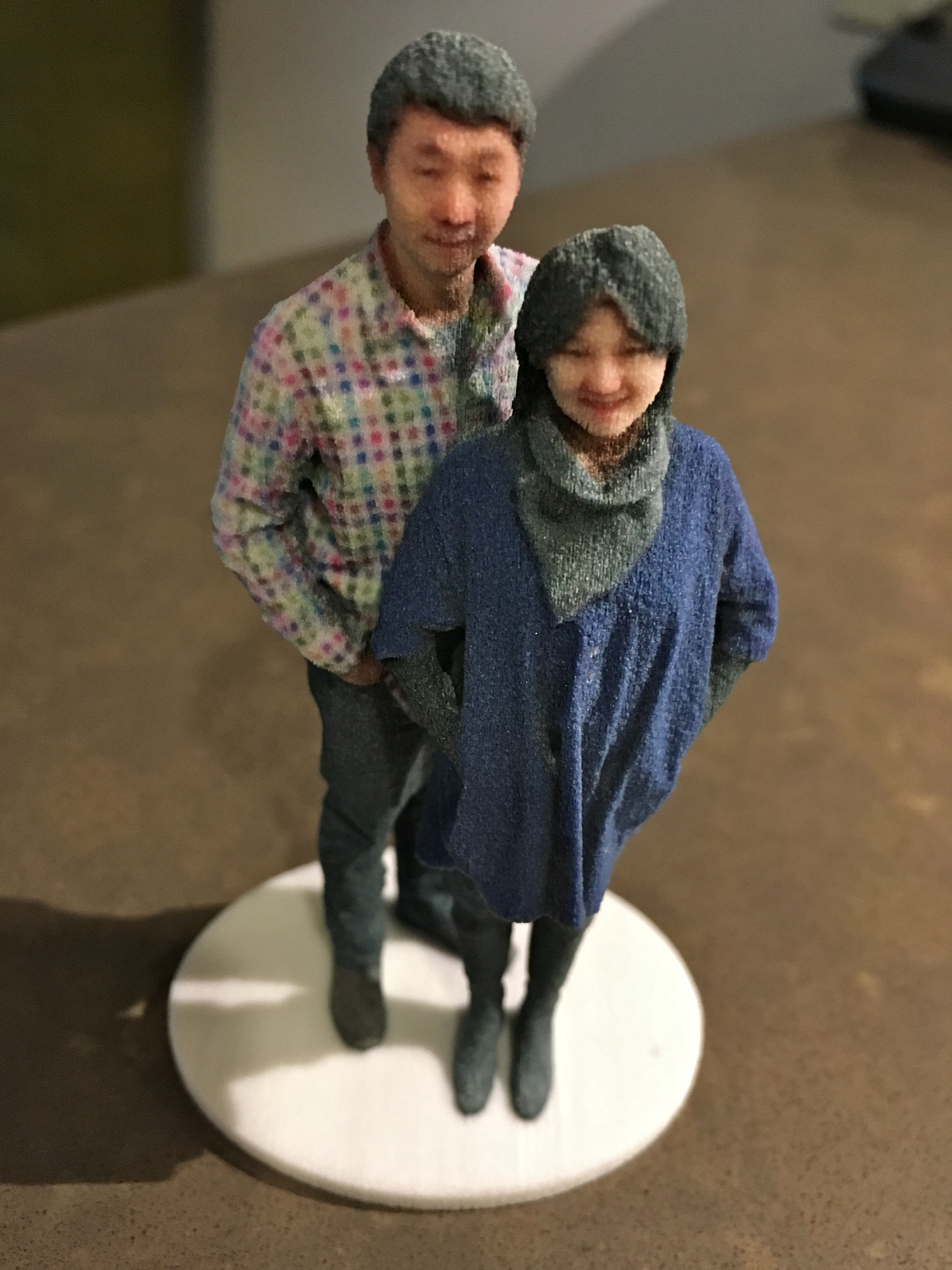
A 3D selfie in 1:20 scale printed by Shapeways using gypsum-based printing

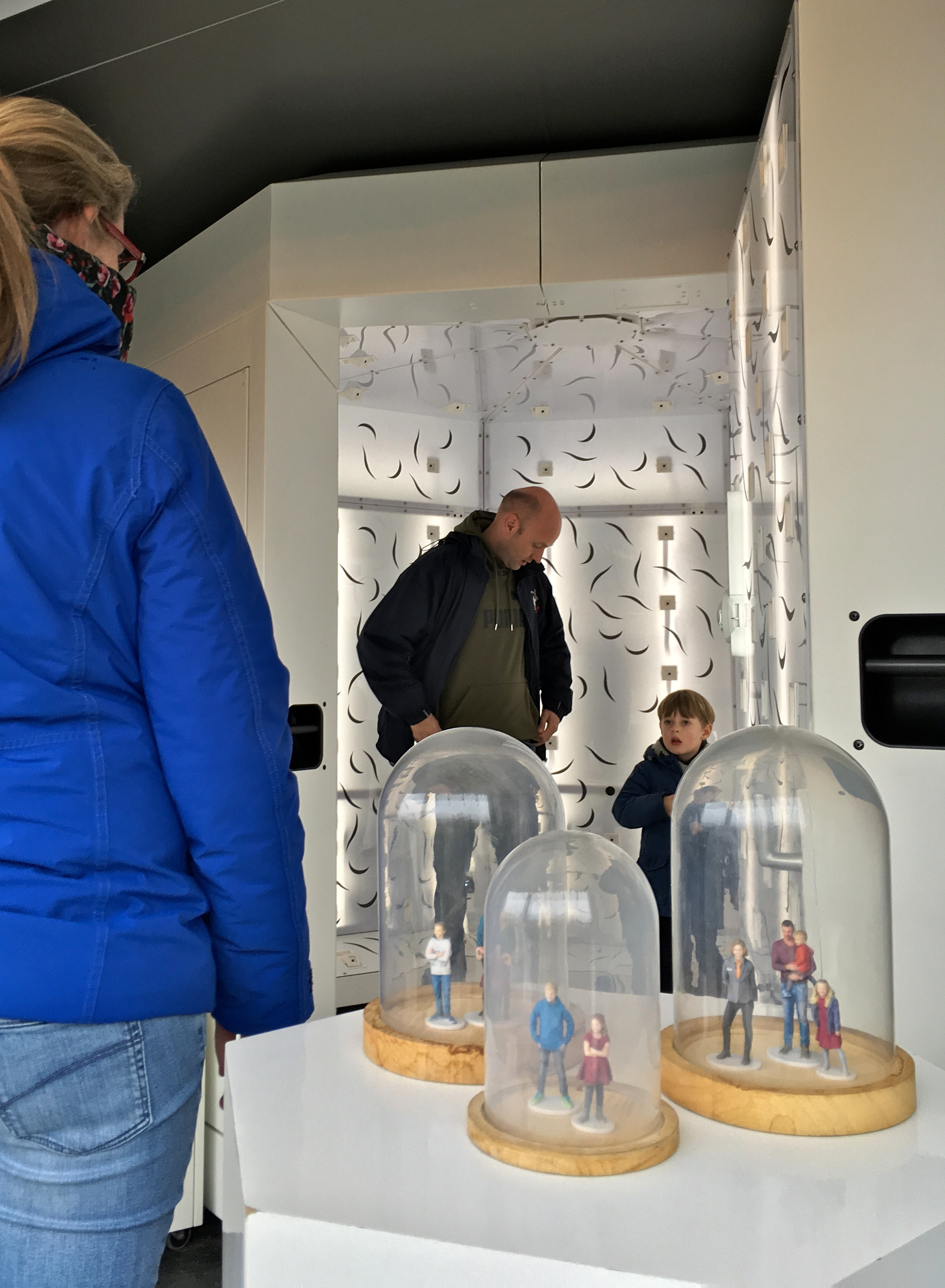
Fantasitron 3D photo booth at Madurodam

A 3D photo booth such as the Fantasitron located at Madurodam, the miniature park, generates 3D selfie models from 2D pictures of customers. These selfies are often printed by dedicated 3D printing companies such as Shapeways. These models are also known as 3D portraits, 3D figurines or mini-me figurines.

=== Communication ===
Employing additive layer technology offered by 3D printing, Terahertz devices which act as waveguides, couplers and bends have been created. The complex shape of these devices could not be achieved using conventional fabrication techniques. Commercially available professional grade printer EDEN 260V was used to create structures with minimum feature size of 100 μm. The printed structures were later DC sputter coated with gold (or any other metal) to create a Terahertz Plasmonic Device. In 2016 artist/scientist Janine Carr Created the first 3d printed vocal percussion (beatbox) as a waveform, with the ability to play the soundwave by laser, along with four vocalised emotions these were also playable by laser.

=== Domestic use ===
Some early consumer examples of 3d printing include the 64DD released in 1999 in Japan. As of 2012, domestic 3D printing was mainly practiced by hobbyists and enthusiasts. However, little was used for practical household applications, for example, ornamental objects. Some practical examples include a working clock and gears printed for home woodworking machines among other purposes. Web sites associated with home 3D printing tended to include backscratchers, coat hooks, door knobs, etc.

As of 2023 consumer 3D printing has become increasingly common, an estimated 85% of 3D printers sold now are of the personal/desktop markets. 3D printing is frequently used by at home DIY/maker communities in modern times, as 3D printers have become significantly more affordable for consumer audiences in recent years.

The open source Fab@Home project has developed printers for general use. They have been used in research environments to produce chemical compounds with 3D printing technology, including new ones, initially without immediate application as proof of principle. The printer can print with anything that can be dispensed from a syringe as liquid or paste. The developers of the chemical application envisage both industrial and domestic use for this technology, including enabling users in remote locations to be able to produce their own medicine or household chemicals.

3D printing is now working its way into households, and more and more children are being introduced to the concept of 3D printing at earlier ages. The prospects of 3D printing are growing, and as more people have access to this new innovation, new uses in households will emerge.

The OpenReflex SLR film camera was developed for 3D printing as an open-source student project.

=== Education and research ===
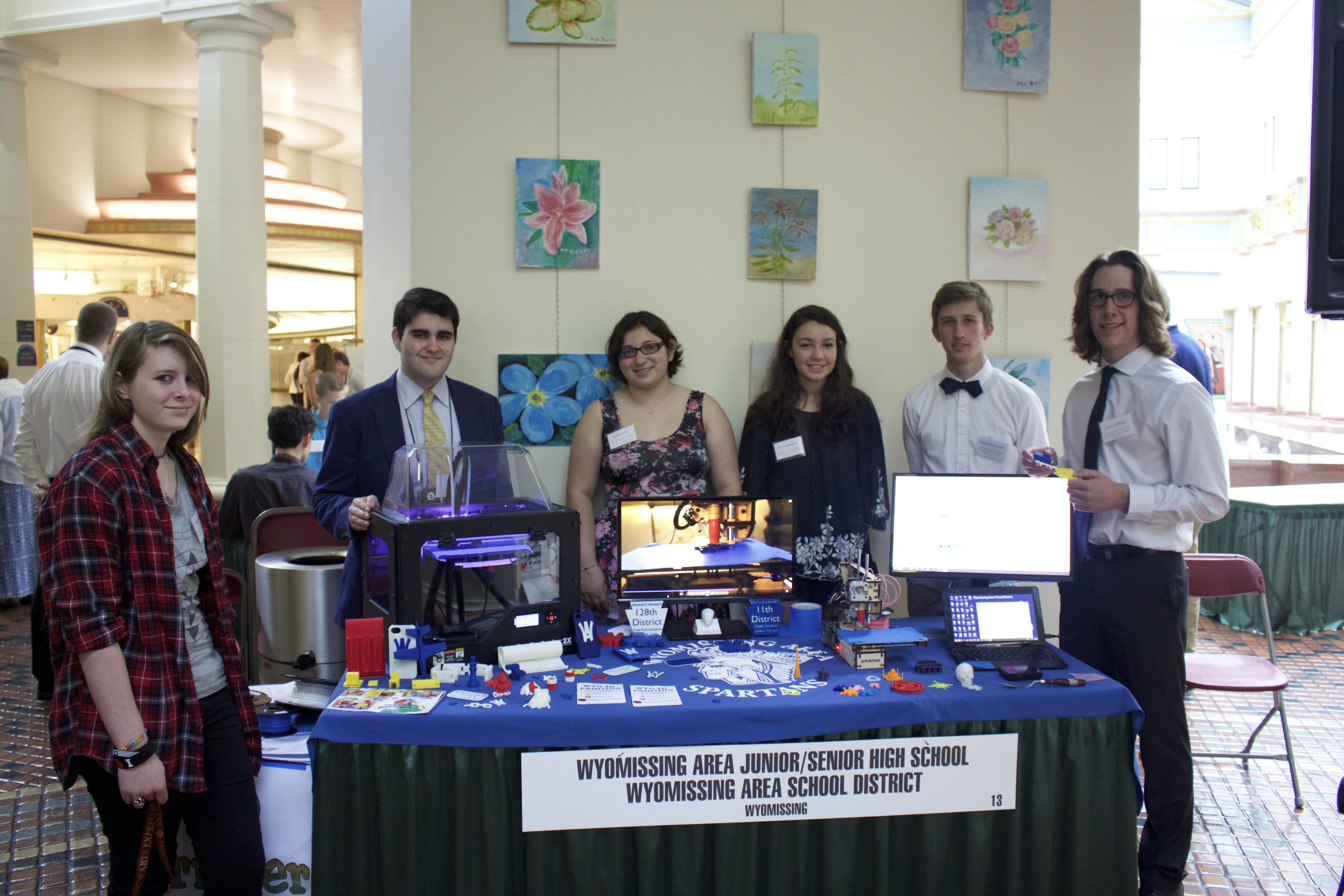
High School students from Wyomissing Area Jr/Sr High School in Pennsylvania, United States present their use of 3D Printing in the classroom

3D printing, and open source 3D printers in particular, are the latest technology making inroads into the classroom. 3D printing allows students to create prototypes of items without the use of expensive tooling required in subtractive methods. Students design and produce actual models they can hold. The classroom environment allows students to learn and employ new applications for 3D printing. RepRaps, for example, have already been used for an educational mobile robotics platform.

Some authors have claimed that 3D printers offer an unprecedented "revolution" in STEM education. The evidence for such claims comes from both the low cost ability for rapid prototyping in the classroom by students, but also the fabrication of low-cost high-quality scientific equipment from open hardware designs forming open-source labs. Engineering and design principles are explored as well as architectural planning. Students recreate duplicates of museum items such as fossils and historical artifacts for study in the classroom without possibly damaging sensitive collections. Other students interested in graphic designing can construct models with complex working parts easily. 3D printing gives students a new perspective with topographic maps. Science students can study cross-sections of internal organs of the human body and other biological specimens. And chemistry students can explore 3D models of molecules and the relationship within chemical compounds. The true representation of exactly scaled bond length and bond angles in 3D printed molecular models can be used in organic chemistry lecture courses to explain molecular geometry and reactivity.

According to a recent paper by Kostakis et al., 3D printing and design can electrify various literacies and creative capacities of children in accordance with the spirit of the interconnected, information-based world.

Future applications for 3D printing might include creating open-source scientific equipment.

=== Environmental use ===
In Bahrain, large-scale 3D printing using a sandstone-like material has been used to create unique coral-shaped structures, which encourage coral polyps to colonize and regenerate damaged reefs. These structures have a much more natural shape than other structures used to create artificial reefs, and, unlike concrete, are neither acid nor alkaline with neutral pH.

=== Cultural heritage ===
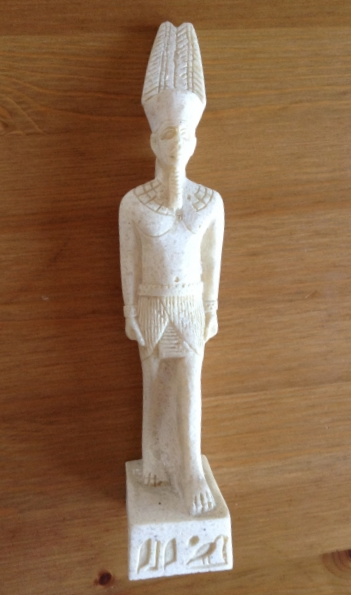
3D printed sculpture of the Egyptian Pharaoh Merankhre Mentuhotep shown at Threeding

In the last several years 3D printing has been intensively used by in the cultural heritage field for preservation, restoration and dissemination purposes. Many Europeans and North American Museums have purchased 3D printers and actively recreate missing pieces of their relics.

Scan the World is the largest archive of 3D printable objects of cultural significance from across the globe. Each object, originating from 3D scan data provided by their community, is optimised for 3D printing and free to download on MyMiniFactory. Through working alongside museums, such as The Victoria and Albert Museum and private collectors, the initiative serves as a platform for democratizing the art object.

The Metropolitan Museum of Art and the British Museum have started using their 3D printers to create museum souvenirs that are available in the museum shops. Other museums, like the National Museum of Military History and Varna Historical Museum, have gone further and sell through the online platform Threeding digital models of their artifacts, created using Artec 3D scanners, in 3D printing friendly file format, which everyone can 3D print at home.

=== Specialty materials ===
Consumer grade 3D printing has resulted in new materials that have been developed specifically for 3D printers. For example, filament materials have been developed to imitate wood in its appearance as well as its texture. Furthermore, new technologies, such as infusing carbon fiber into printable plastics, allowing for a stronger, lighter material. In addition to new structural materials that have been developed due to 3D printing, new technologies have allowed for patterns to be applied directly to 3D printed parts. Iron oxide-free Portland cement powder has been used to create architectural structures up to 9 feet in height.

== See also ==
- 3D printing processes
- 3D printing
- Construction 3D printing
- Gridfinity
- Health and safety hazards of 3D printing
