= Noa (name) =

Noa is both a male and female given and family name.

In Israel, the name Noa (Hebrew: נֹועָה / נֹעָה), which means "movement" is primarily a popular given name for girls. In some languages, Noa is an alternate spelling of the Hebrew name Noah (Hebrew: נֹחַ), although the names are unrelated in Hebrew and are spelled and pronounced differently.

== People ==
First name

- Noa (born 1969), Israeli singer
- Noa, Japanese singer
- Noa (born 2000), Japanese singer and actor
- Noa (乃紫) (born 2000), Japanese singer
- Noa Boissé (born 2006), French footballer
- Noa Cohen (born 2002), Israeli actress and model
- Noa Essengue (born 2006), French basketball player
- Noa Denmon (born 1995 or 1996), American illustrator
- Noa James (born 1984), American rapper
- Noa Kirel (born 2001), Israeli singer and actress
- Noa Kouakou-Heugue (born 2007), French basketball player
- Noa Lang (born 1999), Dutch football player
- Noa Leatomu (born 2003), soccer player
- Noa Lindberg, American actress
- Noa Nadruku (born 1967), ethnic Fijian rugby player
- Noa Nakaitaci (born 1990), Fiji-born French rugby player
- Noa Nayacakalou, Fijian rugby player
- Noa Palatchy (born 1994), Israeli rhythmic gymnast
- Noa Raviv (born 1987), Israeli fashion designer
- Noa Tishby (born 1977), Israeli actress
- Noa Kazado Yakar (born 2003), Israeli acrobatic gymnast

Surname

- Azusa Noa (野阿; born 1954), Japanese science fiction writer
- Ivana Noa (born 2003), Belgian actress
- Josef Noa (1856–1903), Hungarian chess master
- Juan Noa (died 1963), Manx dialect poet and playwright
- Kaulana Noa (born 1976), American football offensive guard
- Loveman Noa (1878–1901), US Naval officer killed during the Philippines Insurrection
- Manfred Noa (1893–1930), German film director
- Tavevele Noa (born 1992), Tuvaluan sprinter
- Thomas Lawrence Noa (1892–1977), American clergyman
- Yamilka Noa (born 1980), Cuban–Costa Rican poet and filmmaker

== Fictional characters ==
- Noa Kean, a character from Code Black (TV series)
- Noa, a character from Fresh
- Noa (ノア), a character from Kiba
- Noa (dog), a dog from Inubaka: Crazy for Dogs
- Noa Briqualon, a character from Star Wars
- Noa Family (ノア), characters from the Gundam series
- Noa Hollander, a character from the Israeli TV series Beauty and the Baker
  - Noa Hamilton, a character from the American adaptation The Baker and the Beauty
- Noa Izumi (野明), a character from Patlabor
- Noa Kaiba (乃亜), a character from Yu-Gi-Oh!
- Noa Ushio (生塩 ノア), a character from the role-playing game Blue Archive
- Noa Takigawa (ノア), a character from Yamada-kun and the Seven Witches
