= North Forge Fabrication Lab =

North Forge Fabrication Lab is a rapid prototyping workshop and business development facility located in Winnipeg, Manitoba. Founded in September 2011, it is a fabrication laboratory, intended to assist entrepreneurs in developing their ideas into physical prototypes. Facilities at the site include 3D printers in several sizes, CNC laser cutters from 50 to 120 watts, CNC milling machines, a plasma cutter, wood and metal lathes, a Double 3 telepresence robot and facilities for manufacture and test of printed circuit boards. Software resources include various systems for computer aided design.

North Forge is the largest publicly-accessible fabrication laboratory in Canada. It is funded by Canadian federal government, the Manitoba provincial government, and various private sector donors, as well as membership fees charged to the users of the facility.

The North Forge Fabrication Lab is one activity of the North Forge Technology Exchange, which combines the efforts of the former projects AssentWorks, Ramp Up Manitoba, and Startup Winnipeg. The current CEO of North Forge Technology Exchange is Joelle Foster. As of spring 2017, the fab lab has more than 100 members.
