= S. Scott Crump =

American businessman

S. Scott Crump (born Steven Scott Crump) is the inventor of fused deposition modeling (FDM) and co-founder of Stratasys, Ltd. Crump invented and patented FDM technology in 1989 with his wife and Stratasys co-founder Lisa Crump. He is currently the chairman of the board of directors of Stratasys, which produces additive manufacturing machines for direct digital manufacturing (a.k.a. rapid manufacturing); these machines are popularly called “3D printers.” He took the manufacturing company public in 1994 (Nasdaq:SSYS). He also runs Fortus, RedEye on Demand, and Dimension Printing – business units of Stratasys.

Crump managed the early work on another innovation used by FDM machines, the ABS plastic filament, which allows engineers to formulate fully functional parts that have up to 75% of the strength of an actual molded part. In addition, Crump is responsible for other innovations, including: Breakaway Support System (BASS), WaterWorks Support System, the coupling to the CAD/CAM industry for CNC tool path software, a baffled oven for high-temperature build environments and a benchtop 3D Printer (Dimension).

== Philanthropy ==
Through Stratasys, Crump has provided financial support to the SME Bright Minds Mentor Program, affording opportunities for high school students to attend the annual Society of Manufacturing Education (SME) RAPID Conference and Exposition. Stratasys has also donated 3D printers to schools participating in the RAPID event.

== Awards and accolades ==
Crump was ranked among the best CEOs in the United States by DeMarche Associates in 2007. In addition, he has received the following awards and accolades:

- Winner of the Ernst & Young Entrepreneur of the Year Award, 2005.
- Voted one of the top five most influential individuals in rapid product development and rapid manufacturing by Time-Compression Technologies, European edition, TCT Top 25 Influential People survey, 2007.
- Finalist, Minnesota High Tech Association Tekne Awards
- Inducted into the TCT Hall of Fame in September 2017.

== Patents ==
- U.S. patent 5,121,329, June 9, 1989, "Apparatus and Method for Creating Three-Dimensional Objects" (A system and a method for building three-dimensional objects in a layer-by-layer manner via fused deposition modeling)
- U.S. patent 5,340,433, August 23, 1994, "Modeling Apparatus for Three-Dimensional Objects" (An apparatus for building three-dimensional objects via fused deposition modeling)
- U.S. patent 5,503,785, April 2, 1996, "Process of Support Removal for Fused Deposition Modeling", S. Scott Crump; Sam Batchelder; William Priedeman Jr.; and Robert Zinniel. (A process for building three-dimensional objects with break-away support structures)
- U.S. patent 5,866,058, February 2, 1999, "Method for Rapid Prototyping of Solid Models", Sam Batchelder; Scott Crump. (A method for building three-dimensional physical objects with reduced levels of curl and distortion)
- U.S. patent 7,125,512, October 24, 2006, "Rapid Prototype Injection Molding", S. Scott Crump; William Priedeman Jr.; and Jeffery Hanson. (A method for making a prototype injection molded part by extruding a thermoplastic material into a plastic mold tool at a low pressure)
- U.S. patent 7,255,821, August 14, 2007, "Layered Deposition Bridge Tooling", William Priedeman Jr.; and S. Scott Crump. (A method for making a prototype plastic injection molded part using a mold tool made by a fused deposition modeling technique)

== See also ==
- Additive manufacturing
- Desktop manufacturing
- Digital fabricator
- Direct digital manufacturing
- Instant manufacturing
- Rapid manufacturing
- Rapid prototyping
