= Massivit =

Israeli manufacturer of 3D printers

Massivit 3D Printing Technologies Ltd. (Massivit3D) is an Israeli public company traded on the Tel Aviv Stock Exchange (TASE:MSVT) Its headquarters are in Lod. The company develops, constructs and sells Additive Manufacturing printers for production of large parts and develops printing materials for use in their printers.

== History ==
Massivit 3D was founded in 2013 by Gershon Miller, Igor Yakubov and Moshe Uzan. In 1994, Miller established "Idanit" printing, acquired four years later by Scailex Corporation (formerly Scitex) for $60 million. In 1998 he was one of three founders of "Objet", which in 2012 merged with its competitor Stratasys (Nasdaq: SSYS), that had market value of $5.7 billion. In February 2021, By IPO it had raised $50 million. The CEO is Erez Zimerman and the chairman is Yaron Yechezkel. The CBO is Avi Cohen, whom was also working in both Objet and Stratasys for 16 years. Investors includes: institutional investor (including Migdal and Mor Investment House), Stratasys, Yaskawa Electric Corporation and Alpha hedge fund. Among the investors in Masivit are: Tzur Daboosh, the Owner and chairman of the Board Klil Industries, the Japanese electronics corporation, YASKAWA and institutional bodies. Among the members of the company's board of directors is David (Dadi) Perlmutter, who was previously a vice president at Intel.

== Products ==
Massivit 3D main markets are: transportation, shipping, entertainment, furniture, construction and aviation. The first generation of the company's printers inject Dimengel, an acrylic-based plastic gel, that polymerized and creates solid layers under ultraviolet light. In 2016, the company launched its first printer, Massivit 1800. In 2021, the company launched Massivit 5000, an improved version of Massivit 1800. It provides a double material method on which two separate parts can be printed concurrently using disparate materials.

The second generation of printers, based on Massivit 10000, was developed to manufacture molds for composite material end parts for the fibre-reinforced plastic industry. It enabling production of jigs, molds, master tools, fixtures and mandrels. The process is designed to decrease manual labor and material costs, while reducing tooling time. The product 3D prints an outer, wash away shell with the print head and intermittently fills the shell with a thermoset, epoxy casting material, forming an isotropic mold. The encapsulated mold is immersed in water causing, the outer shell to crumble without redundant pollutants, leaving the mold. In May 2022, the company launched Massivit 10000, that won two prizes: The American Composites Manufacturers Association award in the category 'manufacturing' and the IBEX innovation award in the category 'boatbuilding'. The company sells printers in 40 countries.
