= Karina Popovich =

Ukrainian-American researcher (born 2001)

Karina Popovich (born 2001), a Ukrainian American Cornell University alumnus, is the founder of Inertia, a company that combines STEM and art, primarily in underfunded schools; Alpha, a 3D printed clothing company; and Makers for COVID-19/Makers for Change. As a 19-year-old, she led a global-initiative to 3D-print and distribute tens of thousands of personal protective gear. She was selected as one of 125 women for the Smithsonian's IF/THEN collection of scientists.

== Career ==
At age 19, Popovich founded "Makers for COVID-19", a global coalition of hobbyists and 3D printer owners which printed face shields, face masks, and other protective gear during the COVID-19 pandemic. It has turned into Makers for Change as the pandemic winds down, focusing students on making a change in their community.

Alpha, Popovich's 3D-printed clothing brand, had a Maker line featuring diverse women in science and technology.

Inertia creates popup marketing campaigns combining STEM and art aimed at making STEM for accessible to girls and other marginalized groups.

Popovich is one of 125 women in STEM who were 3D scanned for the IF/THEN Collection at the Smithsonian.

== Education and early life ==
Popovich's parents immigrated from Ukraine shortly before she was born.

Popovich is majoring in Applied Economics and Management at the Dyson School of Business at Cornell University.

== Awards and honors ==
- AAAS IF/THEN Ambassador, 2019
- #IfThenSheCan Statue, 2022
- Clinton Global Initiative University COVID-19 Response Award
- Robinson-Appel Humanitarian Award, Cornell University
