= Xilloc =

Xilloc Medical B.V.
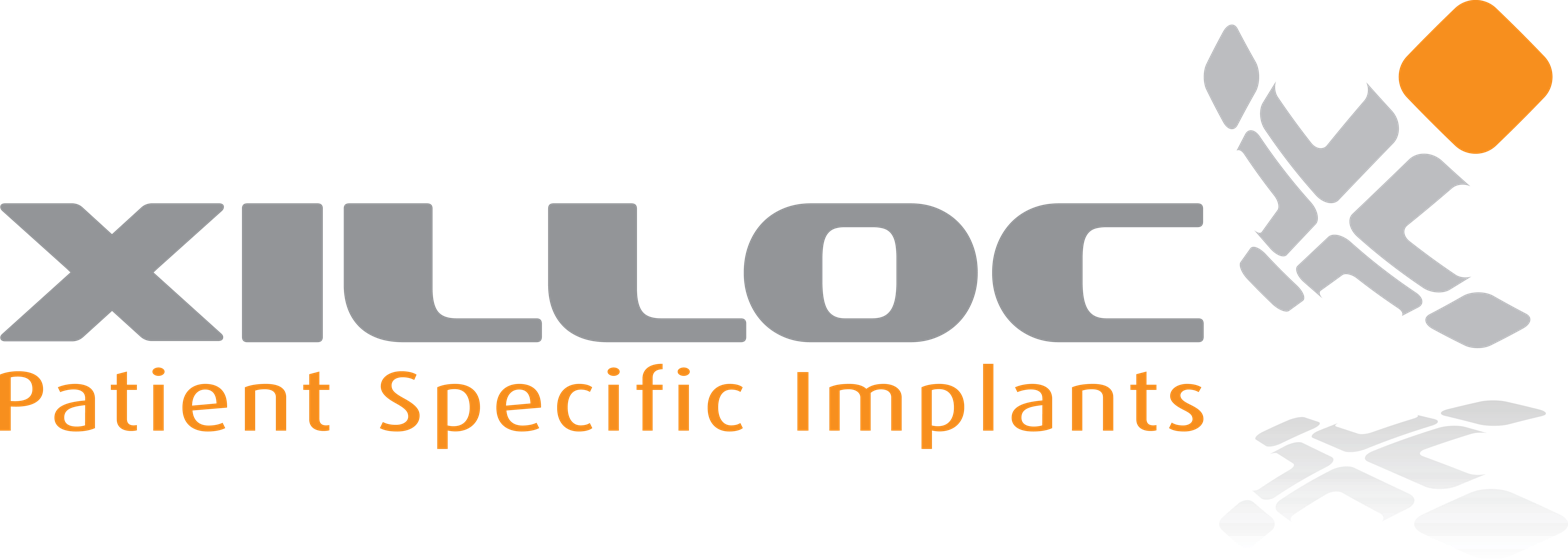
- Type: Corporation
- Industry: Medical Devices
- Founded: 2011
- Headquarters: Sittard-Geleen, The Netherlands
- Number of employees: 15-20
- Website: www.xilloc.com

Xilloc (/ˌɛkˈsɪlɒk/ ek-SILL-ok), headquartered in Sittard-Geleen, The Netherlands is a company that designs and manufactures patient-specific medical devices.

== History ==
Xilloc was founded in 2011 by Maikel Beerens as a spin-off from the Maastricht UMC+ on the principle of using CT imaging to create a 3D model of the anatomy of a patient and then use this data to design and manufacture an implant. This principle was used to create the first 3D printed titanium skull implant in 2003.

In the founding year, Xilloc made the first 3D printed titanium mandible for an elderly woman who suffered from a severe infection in her lower jaw. In 2015, Xilloc announced a partnership with Japanese company Next21 to offer CT-Bone, a 3D printed artificial bone material.

Soon after in 2016 the company produced the world's first 3D printed metal guitar on their M400 machine in aluminium.

In 2018 Xilloc acquired the company OTN, who developed the Click Safety Adapter. This adapter provides a safe connection between a limb prosthesis and an osseointegration implant.
