= E-NABLE =

Open source community for medical devices

e-NABLE is a distributed, open source community that creates and shares open source designs for assistive devices. It is known for creating the first 3D printable prosthetic hand and sharing the designs and code for bioelectric limbs.

== History ==
In 2011, Ivan Owen created a metal, functional puppet hand for a Steampunk costume. After posting a video of the hand on YouTube, he was contacted by South African carpenter Richard Van As who had lost his fingers in a woodworking accident. Owen and Van As worked on prototypes of a prosthetic hand, before Owen decided to incorporate 3D printing into the design process. This led to the creation of the first 3D printed mechanical hand. The sharing of the design of this hand on an Open License led to the creation of the community.

The e-NABLE community "started with around 100 or so people who were simply offering to print the files that were already in existence".

Chapters of the organisation exist in many countries, and each works in different ways. For example, one Canadian chapter recycles excess plastic waste to create the prosthetics. A chapter in Aden, Yemen, is producing prosthetic hands for people injured in Yemen's civil war.

The Open Source nature of the project is enabling diverse groups around the world to create prosthetics for people within their own communities. A Colombian engineer called Christian Silva has created superhero-themed prosthetic arms for children. In 2016, an Iron Man-themed arm created by Albert Menero was given to a child by Iron Man actor Robert Downey Jr.

== How it works ==
The E-nable website contains a tool called the “Handomatic,” which is used to fit prosthetic hands according to the measurements of the individual recipient. The tool then creates a custom design which can then be downloaded.

=== Categories of design ===
- Body powered arms and hands
- Functional lower legs
- Myoelectric upper limbs
- Upper limb exoskeleton
- Tools
- Devices for people with vision impairment
- Teaching manipulatives
