= PPE Portrait project =

Way to humanize medical staff wearing PPE

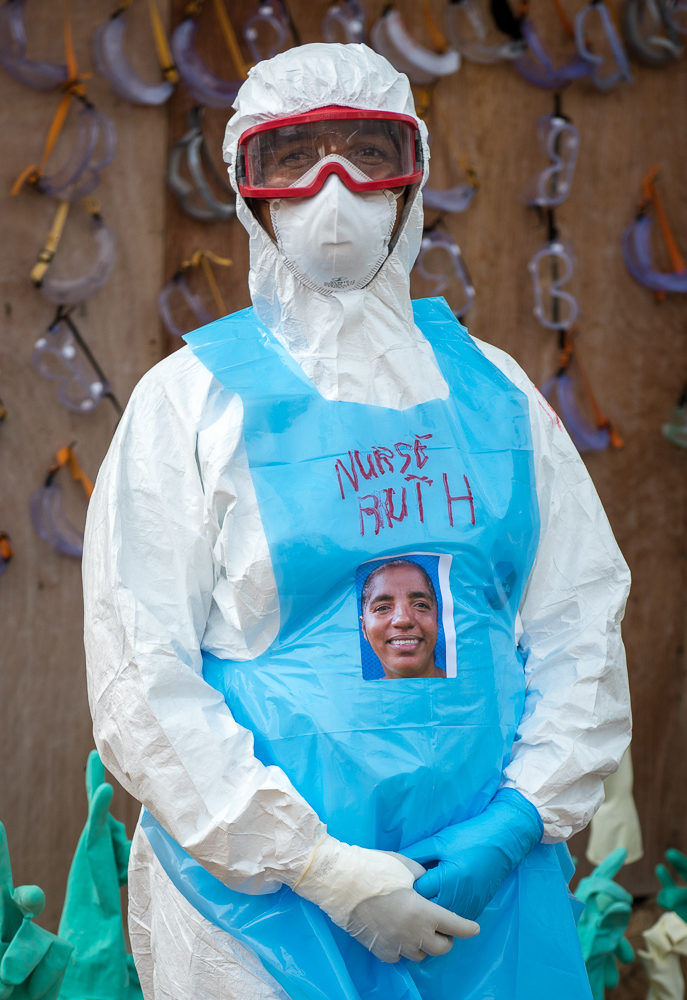
- RN Ruth Johnson, Ebola Treatment Unit, 2015
- Founder: Mary Beth Heffernan
- Country: Liberia
- Key people: Cati Brown-Johnson
- Established: 2014
- Website: www.ppeportrait.org

The PPE Portrait project started during the 2014–2015 Ebola outbreak in Liberia by artist Mary Beth Heffernan as a way to humanize physicians, nurses and other medical professionals wearing full personal protective equipment (PPE). Patients experiencing one of the most terrifying times of their lives are unable to see the faces of their medical staff, but having a photo sticker on the staff member's PPE gown allows the patient to better relate to their caregiver. This project was revived in 2020 by Stanford social scientist Cati Brown-Johnson and featured on The Rachel Maddow Show, NPR, Smithsonian magazine and KQED.

== 2014–2015 Ebola outbreak ==
The idea came from the 2014–2015 Ebola outbreak in Liberia. American artist Mary Beth Heffernan, who is a professor of art and art history at Occidental College, saw the full suits the Ebola health workers were wearing and she created the PPE Portrait Project. Heffernan called it "an art intervention designed to improve Ebola care". Regarding cultural sensitivity, Heffernan said that developing the project "involved close readings of Ebola survivors’ stories, in particular the first-person narratives of doctors who became infected and lived to write about it. Their stories were electrifying, and the words they chose to describe their experience—of being sick, isolated, and the trauma of not seeing a human face in their caregivers—are seared in my mind." The grant funded project focused on isolation of patients—the benefits of "puncturing that isolation" by allowing patients to better connect with their providers. Liberian doctors J. Soka Moses and Moses Massaquoi invited Heffernan to visit with the Ebola doctors and staff. Massaquoi said that he was receiving emails from people "pitching some untested scheme ... it was getting to be kind of a pain". But the proposal to put photos on the suits made so much sense he responded to Heffernan immediately. Heffernan told Maddow staff that she "had hoped the PPE portraits would become standard best medical practice for all kinds of patients who have to experience isolation of never seeing people outside of PPE—only masked faces for days at a time."

The Gold Foundation funded Heffernan to travel to Liberia. Heffernan had received $5,000 that she was using for this project. Health care staff there "reported feeling more human". She spent three weeks training the staff and left supplies for them to use. Heffernan wanted the project to be "sustainable and achievable with local means."

The project was featured in the Being Human exhibition at the Wellcome Collection in London in September 2019. The exhibit featured mannequins dressed in PPE with PPE Portrait labels. Heffernan provided first-person narratives from the healthcare workers featured to accompany the exhibit. Those featured received an honorarium for the use of their image and story.

In the five years since the Ebola outbreak, Heffernan approached many hospitals but found that they were uninterested. Medical staff wearing full PPE during the COVID-19 pandemic has changed that attitude with many hospitals. However, many of the providers involved in the original project have reported that they are not currently using PPE Portrait labels, as they are instead focused on the challenges of "sourcing and rigorously using the PPE itself."

== COVID-19 pandemic ==
So your terrified patients who can't actually see really any of your face, at least have some idea of who you are and what you really look like

— Rachel Maddow, May 8, 2020

Cati Brown-Johnson from Stanford University School of Medicine revived the project for the COVID-19 pandemic. She says she is a social scientist who is interested in human connections. Brown-Johnson says the research behind this idea shows that "a warm and competent provider connects with the healing mechanisms within a person's own body. And PPE, obviously it's straight up and down ... competence. It tells you competence right away, the only warmth you might get would be a PPE portrait, that is some of the basis of the research that has us interested in pursuing this." Brown-Johnson further said that they are seeing an improvement in the morale of the medical staff, as it makes them feel more humanized. Brown-Johnson first tried out the revived program at a drive-thru testing site at Stanford.

Staff during one of the trial tests for the project said that right away they noticed better interactions with patients. One nurse, Anna Chico, who worked in the drive-up COVID-19 testing site, said she introduced herself by pointing to her portrait and saying "this is me under all this". Doctors reported that it felt like they were working with people on the team, "instead of inanimate objects".

The Rachel Maddow Show learned about this project when they noticed that doctor Ernest Patti from St. Barnabas Hospital, whom they had interviewed several times on the show about his experiences working with COVID-19 patients, appeared in full PPE but with a smiling photo of himself on the outside of his PPE gown. The Maddow staff inquired with Patti and learned that a woman had seen him on previous Maddow shows and mailed him a set of stickers of his own face for use on his gown. The woman was Dr. Lori Justice Shocket who is an artist and holds a medical degree. She is also married to an ER doctor and has a child and step-child who are also ER doctors. Shocket asks people to email her photos of their faces; she prints stickers and mails them back.

The goal of the project according to Heffernan is to give hospitals the tools and training so they can independently run the project. She hopes that all medical professionals will use PPE portraits whenever they wear masks irrespective of if they are in full PPE or not. In situations where medical staff are wearing a mask, seeing a smiling photo would be beneficial for the patient. Maddow further said of the PPE Portrait project that seeing a photo of their caregiver helps create a genuine connection instead of an "alien connection, even when they are doing the best to save your life". Smithsonian magazine states the feeling of seeing someone in full PPE is like "anonymizing these individuals as masked, expressionless staff members in space suits". In Liberia, Heffernan said that the medical workers "found themselves perceived as 'scary ninjas'—are isolating, dehumanizing and compound patient fear".

Other hospitals starting to use PPE portraits as of April 2020 are the University of Massachusetts Medical School, USC Keck School of Medicine and Boston Children's Hospital.

Attaching photos to PPE is such a simple, low-tech tool—yet it can transform those precious moments of care at a time when patients are sick, scared, and feeling alone. We were so glad to support Mary Beth Heffernan and her brilliant idea in her initial PPE Portrait Project work. We urge all hospitals to adopt this practice, so that both patients and healthcare teams can benefit.

— Dr. Richard I. Levin, President and CEO of the Gold Foundation

== Practicalities ==
Stanford Medicine's website suggests that in high-risk settings the photo will be discarded with the disposal of the gown. In lower risk settings where the gown will be reused, the photo sticker will need to be disinfected before using the gown, much in the same way a name badge would be. Stanford suggests that if someone is creating the portrait of themself, they should use the portrait setting on their smartphone, look directly into the camera lens and "offer the smile you want your patients to see". Heffernan recommends using 8.5"×11" matte surface sticky labels that are not reusable. Laminating, disinfecting and reusing was first discussed but there were concerns that the hard edge of the plastic might damage the PPE gown and become a source for contamination. Medical staff can keep a supply of photo labels in the donning area. It is suggested that the photo be worn at "heart level, because your care is coming from your heart".
