= Gridfinity =

Standard for physical object storage

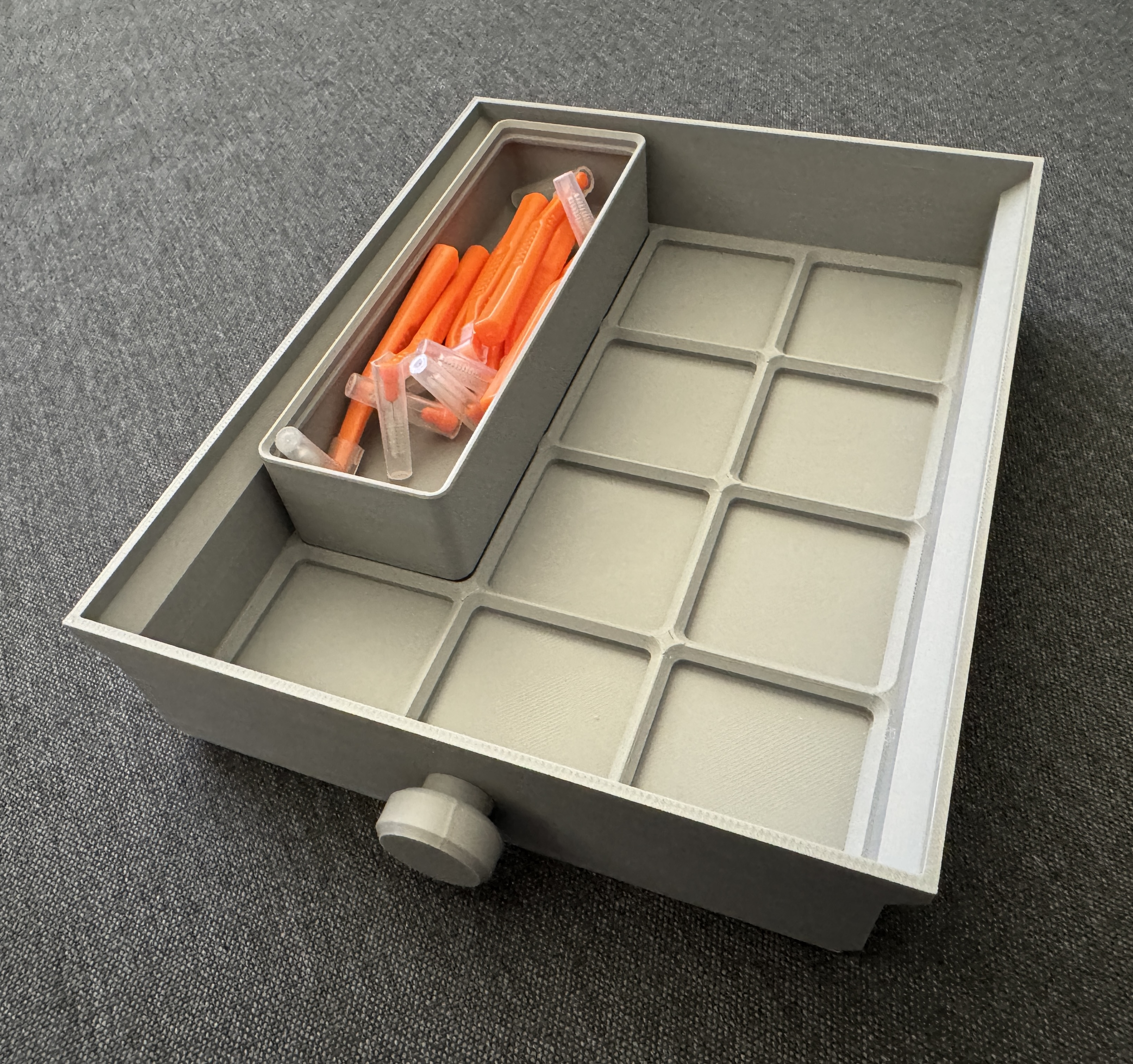
A 3D-printed drawer with a 4×3 Gridfinity baseplate and an 1×3 Gridfinity bin, used to store toothpicks

Gridfinity is an open standard describing a 3D-printed modular storage system for physical items.

It defines a quadratic grid "baseplate" in which plastic bins and other receptacles are arranged. The components' dimensions are multiples of 42 mm in width and breadth, and multiples of 7 mm in height, allowing components of varying sizes to be arranged and stacked efficiently.

The 3D prototyper Zack Freedman designed Gridfinity in 2022 to store screws, tools and the like in his workshop in an easily findable manner. Gridfinity was inspired by the "Assortment System" by Alexandre Chappel. Both systems are licensed under an open Creative Commons NonCommercial license.

Gridfinity has been adopted by a broad community of 3D modeling and printing hobbyists. They have created a plethora of models of Gridfinity components, as well as parametric generators that create component models for users' specifications.

In a 2026 review of the standard, Yadullah Abidi appreciated Gridfinity's sizeable ecosystem of models and noted that it works well to organize items in small enclosed spaces such as drawers. But he found the baseplate grid unnecessarily restrictive and material-consuming for other purposes, and wrote that the standard's fixed dimensions wasted space when storing odd-sized objects.
