= Ivana Noa =

Belgian actress, filmmaker and director

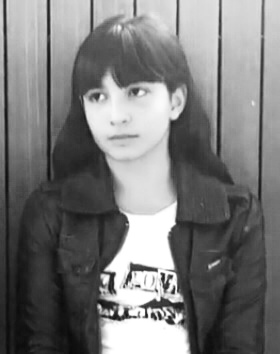
- Ivana Noa at Het Theater Festival, Antwerp, Belgium, 2014
- Born: 13 February 2003 (age 23); Antwerp, Belgium
- Website: www.feelingtodiveandotherstories.com

Ivana Noa (in full Ivana Noa Batchvarov) is a Belgian actress and filmmaker / director. She is best known for her film Feeling to dive and other stories as well as playing the little Juliet in Toneelhuis' Romeo and Juliet at Bourla Theatre. In 2015, she finalizes her second short film Unofficial: JUDO. In 2015/2016 she also works on two documentaries: ACTRESS and INTERVIEW WITH A DIRECTOR. In 2017/2018 she finalizes four short films: FALLIN, TRAFFIC, and FICTIONAL CHARACTERS. She is best known to the general public with her role of Silke Le Grand in the Flemish soap Thuis.

== Career ==
Ivana Noa writes her first short story at the age of 6. In 2012, at the age of 9, she is among the winners of the local kids writing competition “De Wondere Pluim” (“The Wonder Plume”). Another award follows in 2013 with the poem "The girl and the silence" – original title "Het meisje en de stilte". At the age of 10, she writes her first script "Feeling to dive and other stories".

In 2012, Ivana takes part in Angelica Liddell & Atra Bilis Teatro “Maldito sea el hombre que confia en el hombre: Un projet D'Alphabetisation” shown in De Singel, Antwerp as a part of the European tour of the theater performance. In 2013, she plays the little Juliet in Toneelhuis' Romeo and Juliet, directed by Mokhallad Rasem.

In 2017, Ivana Noa plays the role of Gawain in fABULEUS' post-modern theater performance Merlin or the Wasteland, text by Tankred Dorst, directed by Dirk Van Lathauer and Astrid Ogiers.

In 2019, Ivana plays the role of Kreon in KLA's theatre performance Antigone.

In 2020, Ivana Noa interprets the role of Isabella of France in fABULEUS' theater production Edward II. The same year, she interprets the character of Kayley in My name is Language in Dutch, English and Irish. The performance is created and produced by Nicoline Van Harshkamp for MuHKA- Museum of Contemporary Art, Antwerp.

In 2021, Ivana Noa plays Ophelia in Ophelia produced by LOD Music Theater and hetpaleis.

In 2024/2025, she plays the role of April Wheeler in the Belgian theater performance Revolutionary road, written by Richard Yates and produced by TG Stan and De Roovers.

From 2021 till 2024, she interprets the role of Silke Le Grand in the Flemish soap Thuis for Vlaamse Radio- en Televisieomroeporganisatie.

Ivana Noa's first professional TV performance is for Duval Guillaume Modem in their non-profit awareness campaign for “De Opvoedingslijn” - a Flemish advice hotline for parents. A number of interviews and notations in various newspapers and TV stations acknowledge the campaign and Ivana's acting: Het Nieuwsblad, VRT, De Redactie, VTM, Ketnet.

== Filmmaking ==
Ivana directs her first short film in 2014. FEELING TO DIVE AND OTHER STORIES is official selection of CineYouth Chicago International Film Festival, San Diego International Kids Film Festival, Seattle National Film Festival for Talented Youth and wins Best narrative short at Williamsburg International Film Festival. The film is shown also at the Open screening of the 60th International Short Film Festival Oberhausen.

In 2015, Ivana works on her second film: UNOFFICIAL: JUDO, including a number of judo players amongst which World and Olympic champions Ilse Heylen, Toma Nikiforov, Dylan Van Nuffel. The film wins numerous awards at international festivals among which the Rising Star of CineYouth Chicago International Film Festival 2015.

ACTRESS is the second documentary she is working on in 2015 and wins Silver award at the Spotlight Documentary Film Festival.

In 2016, Ivana Noa continues developing her skills in the documentary genre, working on INTERVIEW WITH A DIRECTOR. She explores different expressive elements - original poetry and conceptual art together with direct interview techniques and insert close-ups. The film premiers at Cannes Film Festival SFC. Ivana Noa is named the youngest filmmaker to screen at the festival.

TRAFFIC is a documentary, showing the impossible path of 1000 kids every day on their way to school. One thousand kids on bicycles pass a narrow street full with driving cars two times a day. The film supports KLA' Student council in their effort to improve the traffic situation around the school. Shortly after the release of the film, the City decreases the car traffic in the surroundings in the school pick hours.

In 2017, Noa releases another short film, this time experimental documentary. FALLIN is dedicated to the tragic 2012 "Sierre coach crash", that has claimed the lives of 22 Belgian children. Punctuated by her original and often repetitive poetry and the use of telling glances, empty scenes, and minimalism, Noa's films have an expressive and experimental mood that allow her to capture the raw and confusing moments in the aftermath of a crisis. The film is official selection of a number of international film festivals.

In 2018, Ivana Noa finalizes the short thriller FICTIONAL CHARACTERS. The film is a modern version of the Brothers Grimm' "Hansel and Gretel" where the trivia of the bad provokes the gradual development of every family across the globe, including questions like can a family be gender fluid, what is a gender, is it important, isn't the witch actually the one that makes them different and drives them to take the next step in their understanding of the “self” and transformation of their "virtual I". The film is official selection of a number of international film festivals.

In 2023 Ivana Noa gives her voice to the Flemish Ember, from the Disney Pixar movie Elemental (2023 film), released in Belgium on 21 June 2023.

== Festivals' Jury ==
In 2013, she is invited for a member of the children's juries at the Jeugd Film Festival, Antwerp. In 2014, Ivana Noa is a part of the Kids Juries of Chicago International Children's Film Festival and Het Theater Festival. In 2017, Ivana Noa is speaker for the European Film Awards - Young audience award - in Belgium, hosted by Filem'On - The International Film Festival for Young Audiences Brussels. In 2019, 2020 and 2021 Ivana Noa is the official moderator of the Young Audience Award, presented by the European Film Academy and streamed live from Erfurt, Germany.

== Awards and nominations ==
- 2014 - Williamsburg International Film Festival - Best Short Film - Won
- 2015 - De Wondere Pluim - Step on the mat – Won
- 2015 - CineYouth chapter of Chicago International Film Festival - Rising Star - Won
- 2015 - American Youth Film Festival - Best Foreign Film - Won
- 2015 - Fort Lauderdale International Film Festival - nominated
- 2015 - Spotlight Documentary Film Awards - Silver Award - Won
- 2016 - International Young Poetry Award - Prefecture Toyama - Silver Award - Won
- 2017 - KunstBende - Third place - Won
- 2018 - Best Shorts Competition - Best Young Filmmaker - Won
- 2018 - Independent Horror Movie Awards - Best Actress - Won
- 2019 - French Riviera Film Festival - Best Experimental - Won
- 2019 - Philadelphia Youth Film Festival - Best Experimental - Won
- 2020 - Kansas City FilmFest International - Reel Spirit Young Filmmakers - Second place
