= Stratasys =

Manufacturer of 3D production systems

Stratasys Ltd.
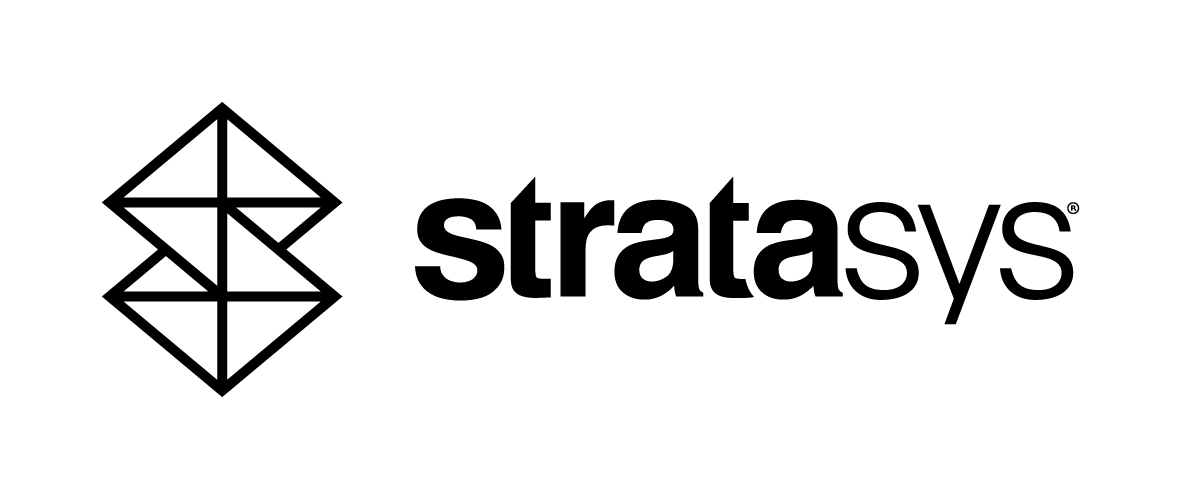

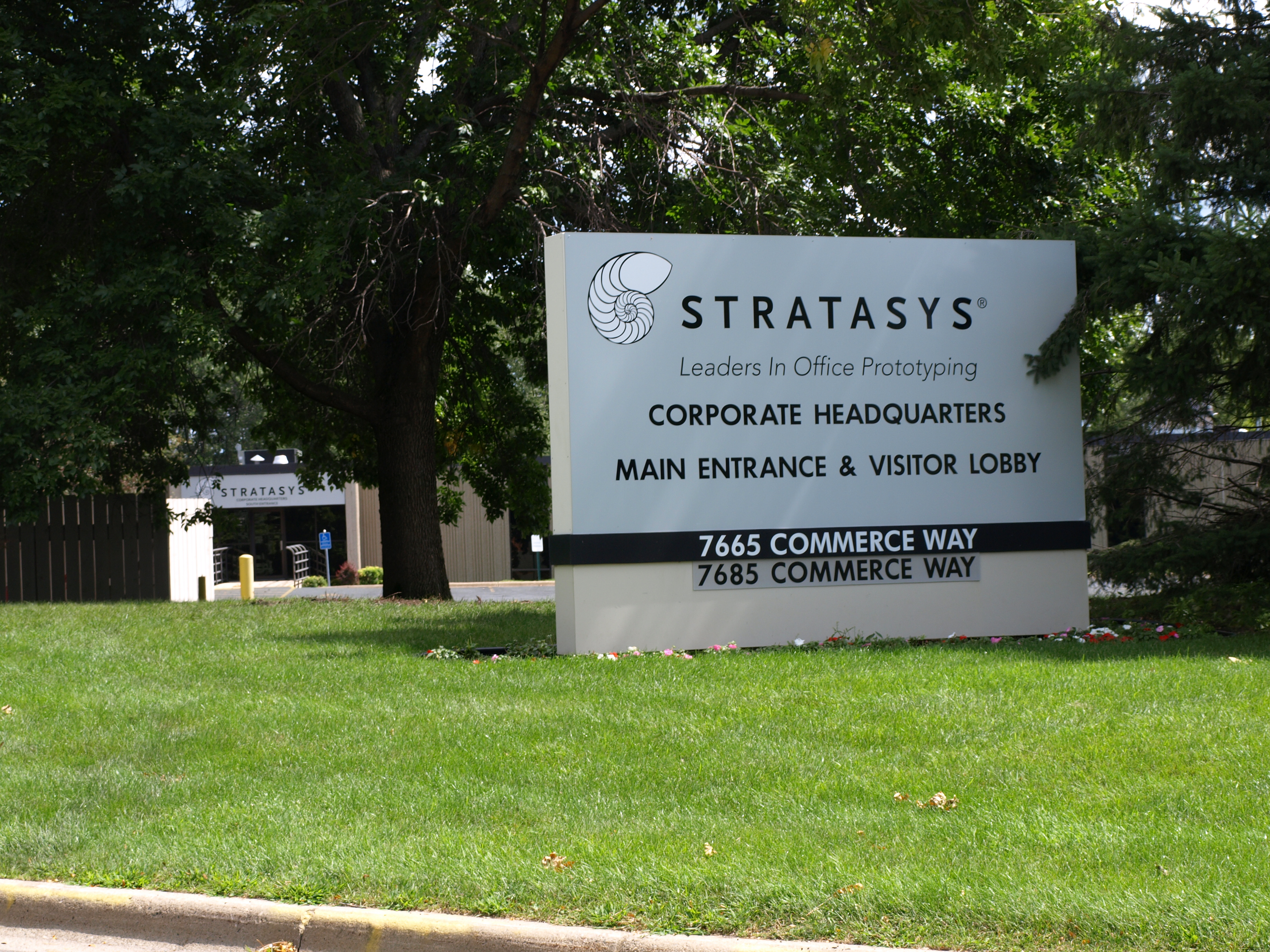
- Headquarters in Eden Prairie, Minnesota
- Type: Public
- Traded as: Nasdaq: SSYS; Russell 2000 component
- Industry: 3D printing
- Founded: 1989; 37 years ago
- Founder: S. Scott Crump
- Headquarters: Minnetonka, Minnesota, U.S.; Science Park, Rehovot, Israel
- Key people: Dov Ofer (chairman); Yoav Zeif (CEO)
- Products: 3D printers; Rapid prototyping solutions; Additive manufacturing solutions for end-use parts
- Revenue: ▼US$572 million (2024)
- Operating income: ▼US$−88 million (2023)
- Net income: ▼US$−123 million (2023)
- Total assets: ▼US$1.13 billion (2023)
- Total equity: ▼US$885 million (2023)
- Owner: Nano Dimension (14.5%)
- Number of employees: 1,980 (2023)
- Subsidiaries: Stratasys Direct
- Website: stratasys.com

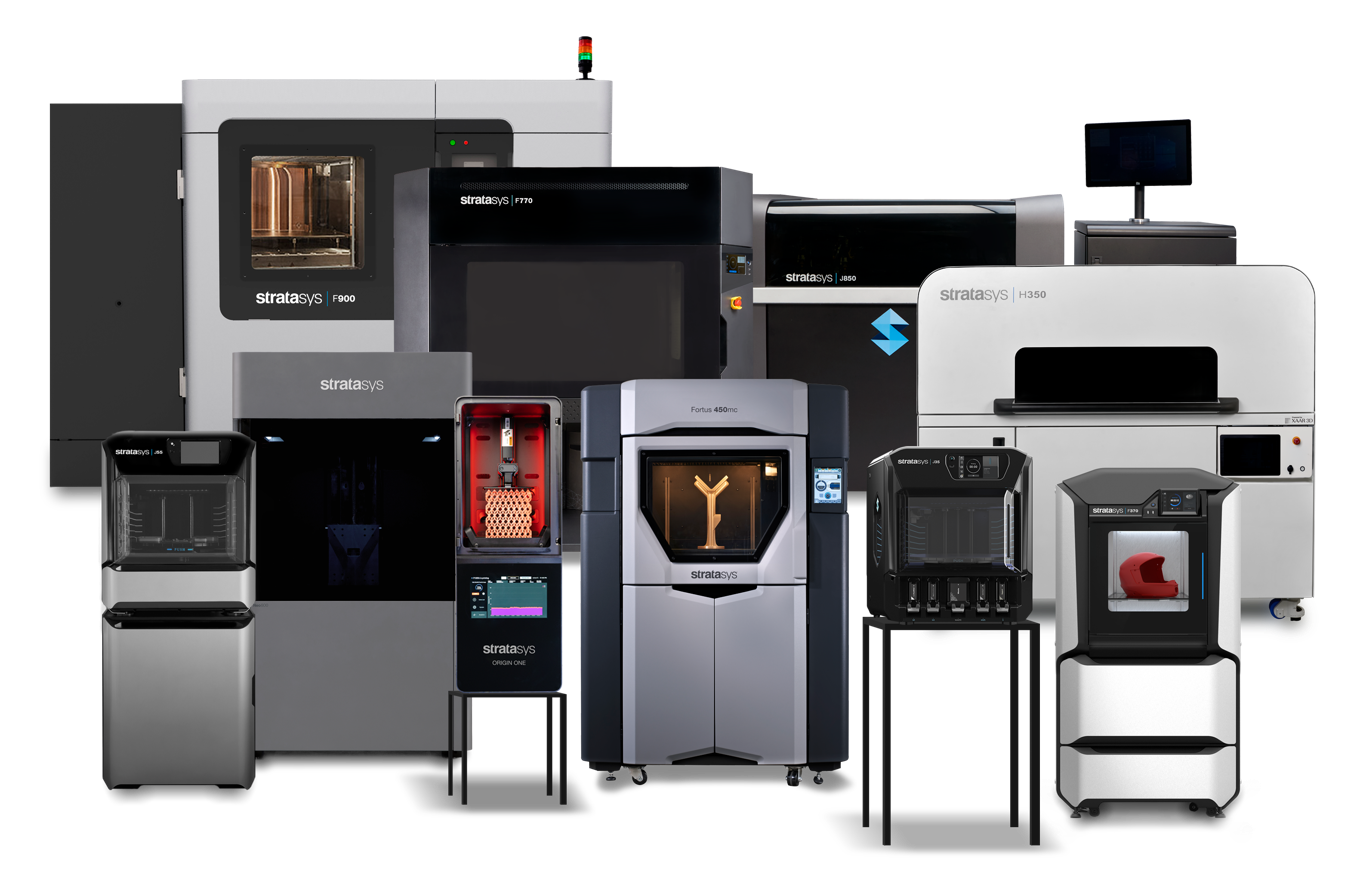
Stratasys industrial 3D printer lineup

Stratasys, Ltd. is an American-Israeli manufacturer of 3D printers, software, and materials for polymer additive manufacturing as well as 3D-printed parts on-demand. The company is incorporated in Israel. Engineers use Stratasys systems to model complex geometries in a wide range of polymer materials, including: ABS, polyphenylsulfone (PPSF), polycarbonate (PC), polyetherimide and Nylon 12.

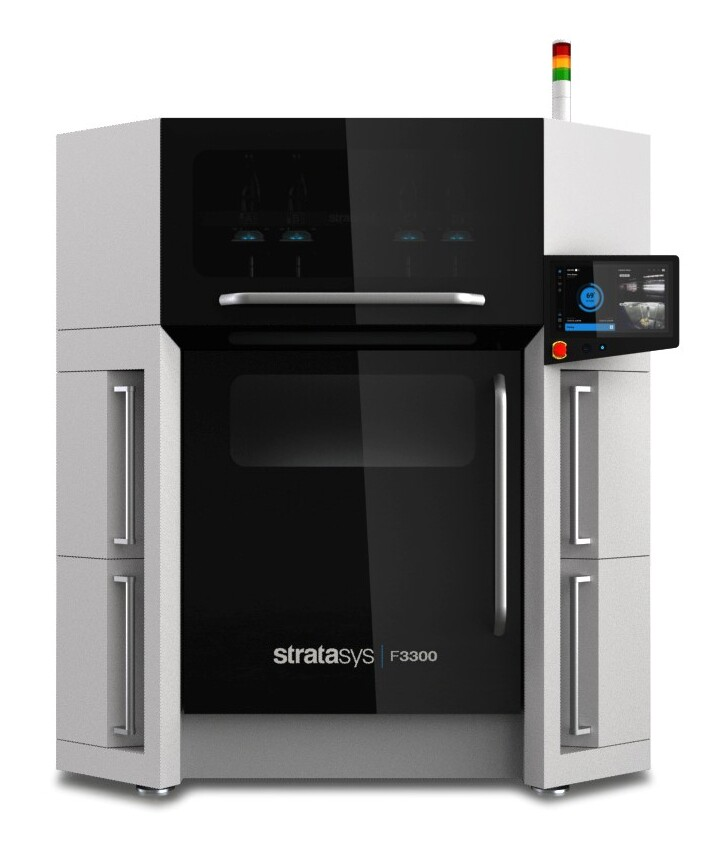
Stratasys F3300 industrial 3D printer platform

Stratasys manufactures in-office prototyping and direct digital manufacturing systems for automotive, aerospace, industrial, recreational, electronic, medical and consumer product OEMs.

== History ==
Stratasys was founded in 1989, by S. Scott Crump and his wife Lisa Crump in Eden Prairie, Minnesota. The idea for the technology came to Crump in 1988 when he decided to make a toy frog for his young daughter using a glue gun loaded with a mixture of polyethylene and candle wax. He thought of creating the shape layer by layer and of a way to automate the process. In April 1992, Stratasys sold its first product, the 3D Modeler.

In October 1994, Stratasys had an initial public offering on Nasdaq; the company sold 1.38 million shares of common stock at $5 per share, netting approximately $5.7 million.

In January 1995, Stratasys purchased IBM's rapid prototyping intellectual property and other assets and employed 16 former IBM engineers, who had been developing a small 3D printer that relied on an extrusion system very similar to Crump's patented fused deposition modeling (FDM) technology.

In 2003, Stratasys fused deposition modeling (FDM) was the best-selling rapid prototyping technology. FDM is a process that the company patented, which is used to produce three-dimensional parts directly from 3D CAD files layer-by-layer for use in design verification, prototyping, development and manufacturing.

In 2007, Stratasys supplied 44% of all additive fabrication systems installed worldwide, making it the unit market leader for the sixth consecutive year.

In January 2010, Stratasys signed an agreement with HP to manufacture HP-branded 3D printers. In August 2012, the HP manufacturing and distribution agreement was discontinued.

In May 2011, Stratasys announced that they had acquired Solidscape, a leader in high-precision 3D printers for lost wax casting applications.

In 2012, Defense Distributed, an unrelated project to produce a working firearm by 3D printing, was intended to use a Stratasys printer. Stratasys refused to permit this and withdrew its license for use of the printer, citing that it did not allow its printers "to be used for illegal purposes".

In 2014 the Israeli fashion designer Noa Raviv featured grid pattern centered couture garments which were created employing Stratasys' 3D printing technology. Some selections from the aforementioned collection were exhibited in 2016 at the exhibition "Manus X Machina" at the Anna Wintour Costume Center at New York City's Metropolitan Museum of Art.

In 2019, the J750 model was recognized as the Enterprise 3D Printer of the Year in the polymer printer category at the 2019 3D Printing Industry Awards in London, England.

In May 2023, Stratasys agreed to combine with Desktop Metal in an all-stock transaction worth at $1.8 billion, in which existing Stratasys shareholders will own around 59 percent of the combined company. Prior to, and following the acquisition announcement, Stratasys received multiple unsolicited bids to be acquired by part-owner Nano Dimensions, and in June, received another offer for $1.2 billion from its competitor 3D Systems. Stratasys terminated the acquisition in September after its shareholders voted against the Desktop Metal acquisition as both major proxy advisory firms Glass Lewis and Institutional Shareholder Services recommended against the deal.

In August 2024, Stratasys filed a suit against Chinese 3D printing company Bambu Lab, alleging patent infringement.

In January 2025, Stratasys launched its TrueDent solution in Europe, bringing monolithic digital dentures to the regional dental market

In March 2025, the company expanded its dental presence in Europe through new distribution agreements with Galimplant, Gold Quadrat, and Métaux Précieux Fast Company named Stratasys one of the World’s Most Innovative Companies of 2025 for its advancements in polymer 3D printing technologies.

=== Mergers and acquisitions ===
On April 16, 2012, Stratasys announced that it agreed to merge with privately held Objet Ltd., a leading manufacturer of 3D printers based in Rehovot, Israel, in an all-stock transaction. Stratasys shareholders were expected to own 55 percent of the combined company, and Objet shareholders would own 45 percent. The merger was completed on December 3, 2012; the market capitalization of the new company was approximately $3.0 billion.

On June 19, 2013, MakerBot Industries announced that it was purchased by Stratasys for $403 million.

On April 2, 2014, Stratasys announced that they had entered into definitive agreements to acquire Solid Concepts and Harvest Technologies, which will be combined with RedEye, its existing digital manufacturing service business, to establish a single additive manufacturing services business unit. The acquisition was finalized on July 15, 2014.

In February 2016, Stratasys announced an investment in Israeli company Massivit to promote and deploy Massivit 3D's proprietary super-sized 3D printing solutions.

On November 4, 2016, Inkbit announced that Stratasys led an equity funding round with DSM Venturing to propel production of its Vision-based, artificial intelligence additive manufacturing platform.

On December 9, 2020, Stratasys announced a deal to acquire San Francisco-based Origin for $100 million. The acquisition was finalized on December 31, 2020.

On April 27, 2021, Stratasys announced the Stratasys Origin One, an updated version of the Origin One 3D Printer targeted towards production applications.

In 2021, Stratasys acquired the outstanding shares of Xaar 3D, which Stratasys purchased from Xaar. Xaar 3D provides 3D printers using SAF Selective Absorption Fusion technology, a type of powder bed fusion. This technology is designed to 3D print polymer production parts at volume. The first printer used the technology is called the H350.

In 2021, Stratasys announced the acquisition of RP Support Ltd. (RPS), which makes large stereolithography 3D printers.

On May 12, 2022, MakerBot and Ultimaker announced plans to merge. The new single company is to be backed by NPM Capital and MakerBot-owner Stratasys and co-led by existing CEOs Nadav Goshen and Jürgen von Hollen.

In October 2022, Stratasys acquired the Berkeley-headquartered quality assurance software company Riven.

April 5, 2023 Stratasys Completes Acquisition of Covestro’s Additive Manufacturing Materials Business

In March 2024, Stratasys acquired the intellectual property portfolio of Arevo, a Silicon Valley-based company specializing in continuous carbon fiber 3D printing.

In May 2025, Stratasys acquired the key assets and operations of Forward AM Technologies GmbH, formerly part of BASF to expand the company's 3D printing materials portfolio.

In July 2025, Stratasys acquired a collection of assets from Nexa3D, including Intellectual Property (IP) and equipment.

== 3D car production systems ==
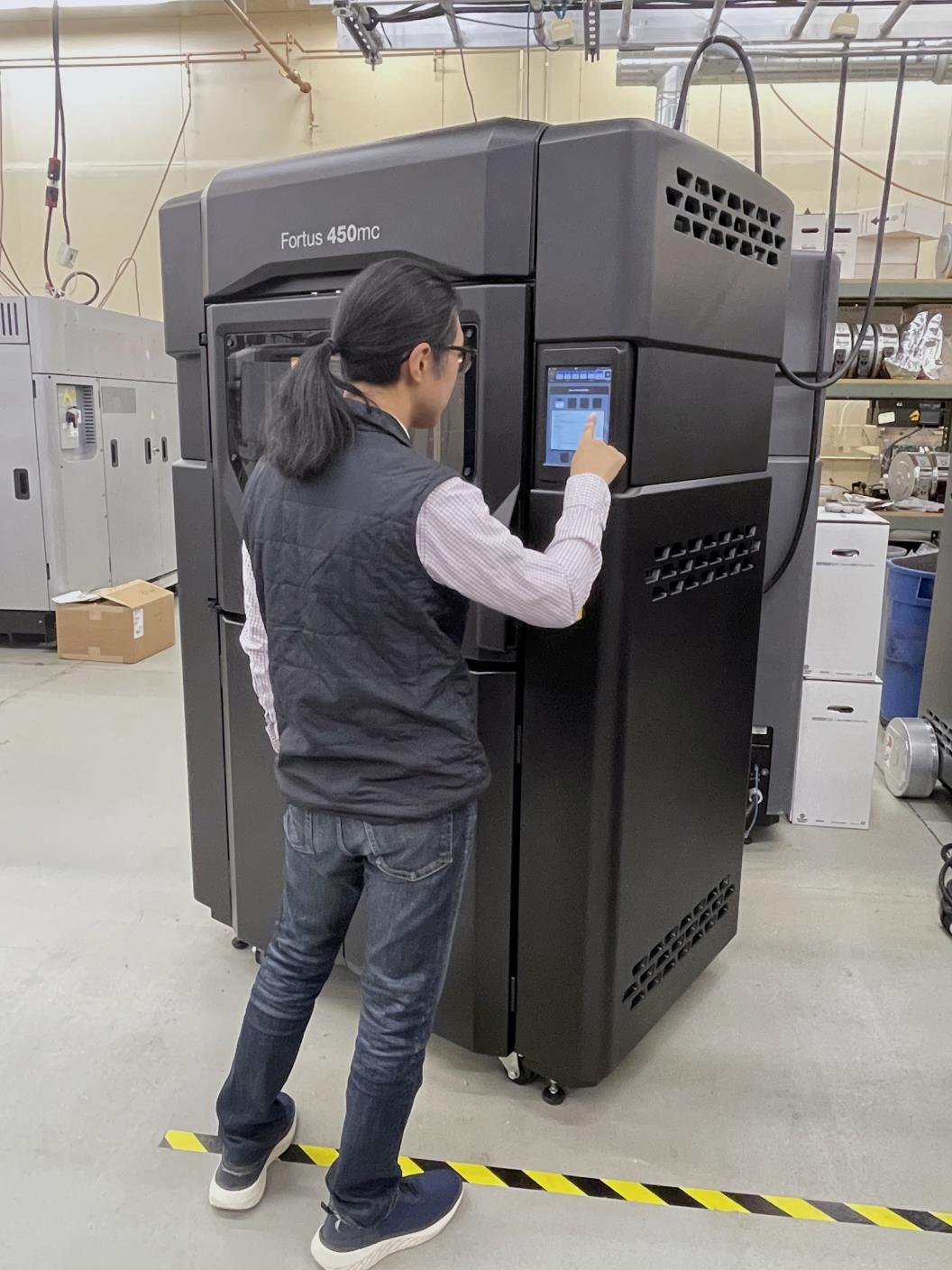
Fortus 450mc system in operational use

In 2014, Stratasys prototyped an electric car with fully 3D-printed exterior panels, and a few printed interior parts. Development took one year, and parts were constructed using a Stratasys Objet1000.

=== Urbee ===
Urbee is the first car in the world manufactured using additive manufacturing technology (its bodywork and car windows were "printed"). Created in 2010, through a partnership with the Canadian engineering group KOR Ecologic, it is a hybrid vehicle with a futuristic look.

== See also ==
- List of 3D printed weapons and parts
- List of 3D printer manufacturers
- Open Design Alliance and .dwg
- Patent troll
- STL
