= Noa Raviv =

Israeli fashion designer (born 1987)

Noa Raviv נועה רביב
- Born: Israel
- Education: Shenkar College of Engineering and Design

Noa Raviv (Hebrew: נועה רביב; born 1987) is an Israeli fashion designer known for her use of grid patterns and employment of 3D printing in her work. She attended Shenkar College of Engineering and Design, graduating in 2014. She collaborated with the tech printing firm Stratasys on two pieces which were exhibited in 2016 in the exhibition Manus X Machina at the Anna Wintour Costume Center in New York City at the Metropolitan Museum of Art. Raviv's work has been as described as manifesting the aesthetic phenomenon of hypertexture.

== Work ==
Raviv's 2014 Hard Copy collection, was based on computer glitches and focused on the value of original objects in our current age. The project was included in the "Manus x Machina: Fashion in an Age of Technology" exhibit at the Metropolitan Museum of Art. In a 2014 article published in Motherboard magazine, Raviv was quoted as saying "The garments, even though there are a lot of things that are digital inside them, at the end they are made through very traditional means."

In the initial design process, Raviv encountered errors within some of her CAD models. In 2015, she used these glitches to produce and installation version of the project for OOPs, an exhibition at Hansen House-Jerusalem.

Hard Copy was her graduate collection at Shenkar College of Engineering and Design.

In her following collection, in Fall 2017, Raviv included items beyond digitally created works, including those garments which Emily Farra, writing in Vogue, described as "painstakingly hand-stitched."

== Awards ==
=== 2014 ===
3D Printshow - Fashion Designer of the Year
