= Double Robotics =

American robotics company

Double Robotics, Inc.
- Type: Private
- Industry: Robotics, Telepresence
- Founded: 2011; 15 years ago
- Headquarters: Burlingame, California, United States
- Products: Telepresence robots: • Double • Double 2 • Double 3
- Website: www.doublerobotics.com

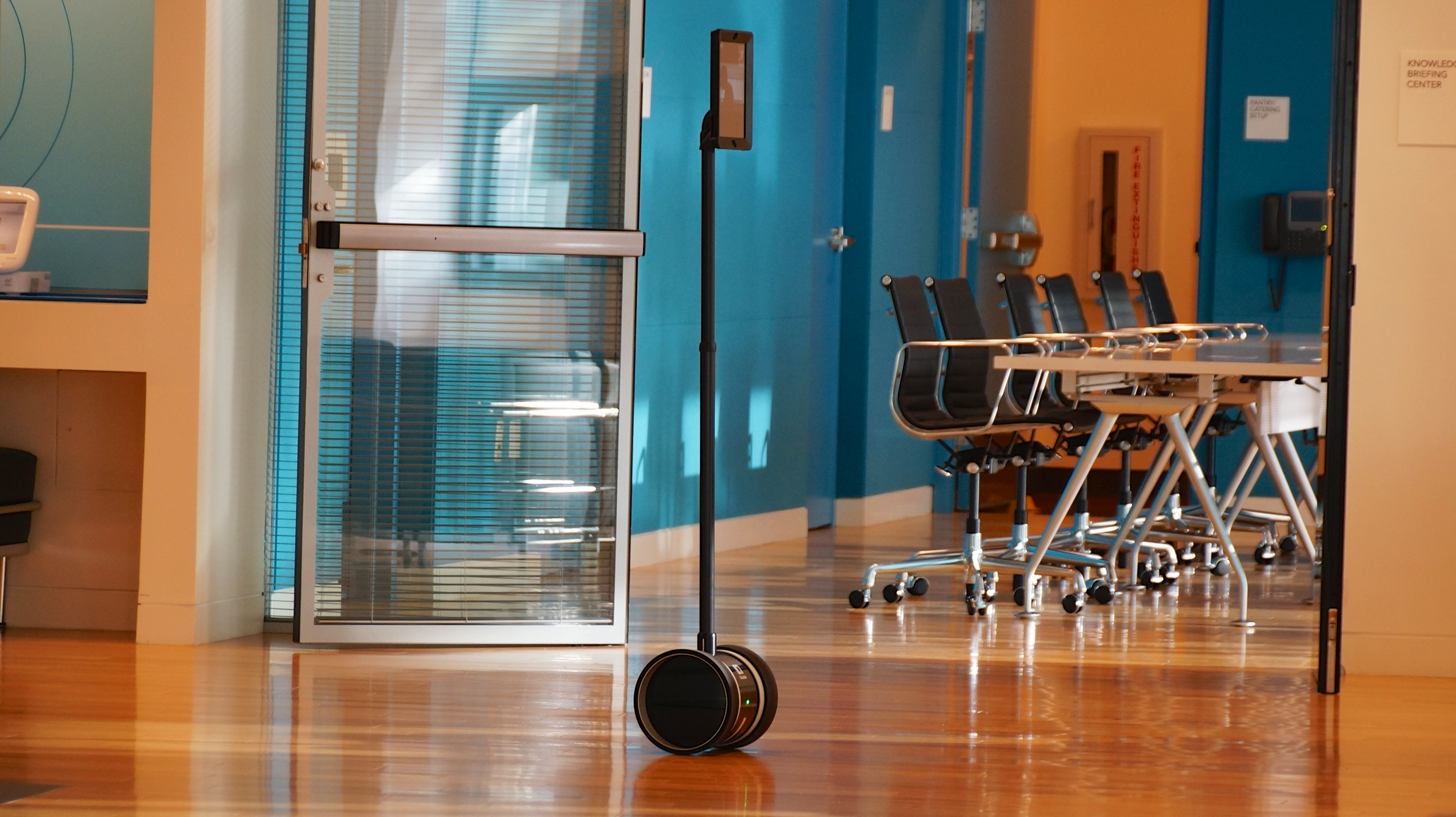
A Double Robotics telepresence robot around 2013

Double Robotics is a technology startup company that produces iPad-based telepresence robots called Double and Double2. Double, which resembles a Segway PT, has a price of $2,499.

The robot uses gyroscope and accelerometer sensors in its base, and can be controlled with a desktop, tablet, or smartphone.

Double Robotics received seed funding from Y Combinator. Johnson & Johnson and The Coca-Cola Company are testing Double and seven Fortune 500 companies have preordered. Preorders total over $500,000. Customer deliveries began February 2013.

As of January 2017, the company claims about 8000 robots being sold since 2013.

In August 2019, the company debuted the Double 3, a robot intended to increase productivity of remote workers and distance learners.

== See also ==
- 3D printing
