= List of 3D-printed weapons and parts =

3D-printed weapons (mainly 3D-printed firearms) and parts that have achieved a level of public notability are listed in the table below.

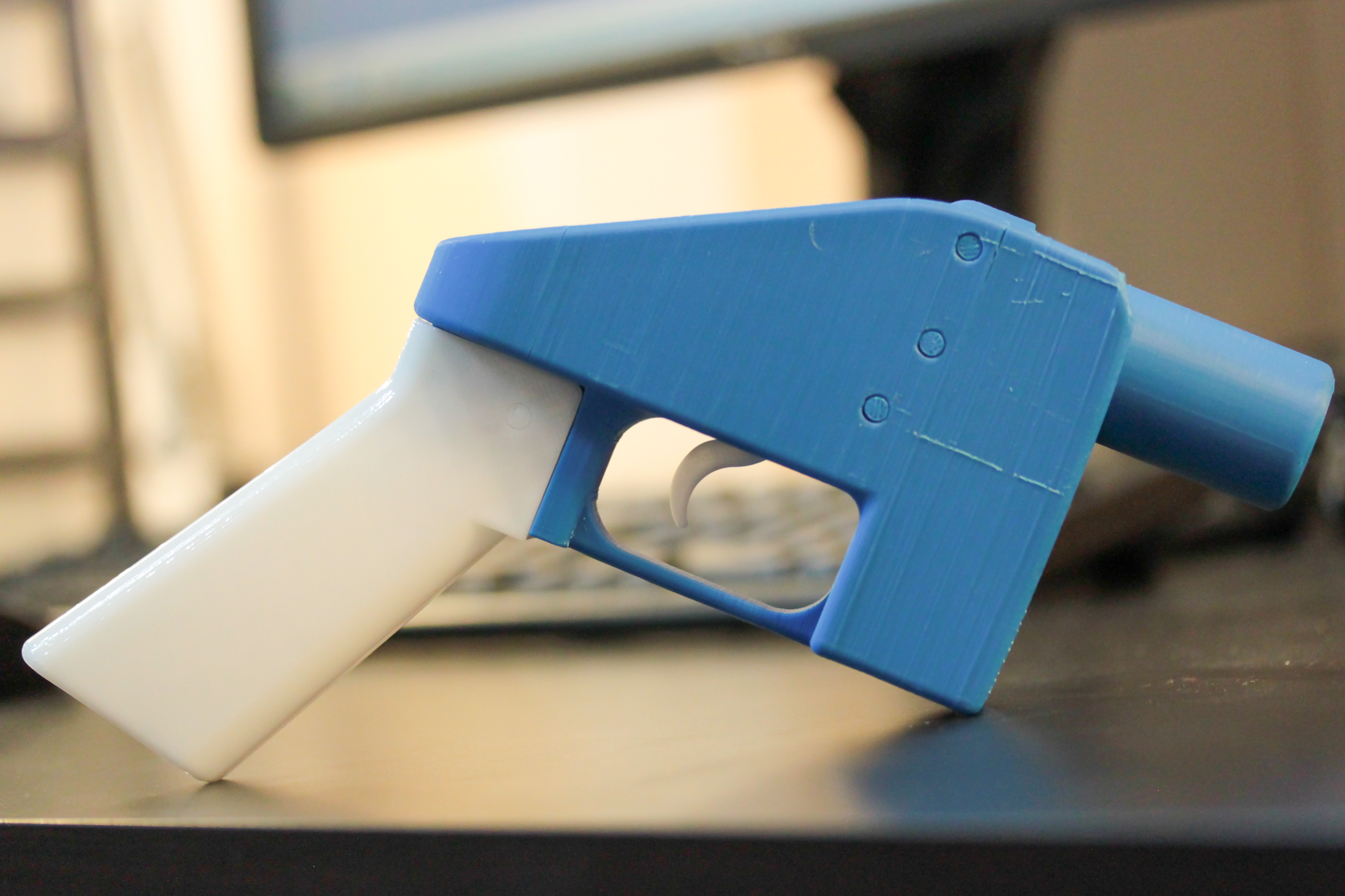
The 3D printed Liberator, by Defense Distributed.

== List of weapons and parts ==
Legend

Plastic – weapon / part used plastic 3D-printer
Metal – weapon / part used metal 3D-printer
Both – weapon / part uses both metal and plastic 3D-printers

=== Entire firearms ===
Name	Date made public	Type	Mechanism	Process	Designer	Other required parts	Caliber
Liberator .380	2013, May	Primarily printed firearm: Pistol	Single shot	FDM	Defense Distributed	Roofing nail	.380 ACP
Liberator .380	A single shot .380 ACP pistol.; Fully 3D printed including springs, requiring only a roofing nail; Notable as the first publicly released printed firearm design						
Grizzly, Grizzly 2.0, G22 v3	2013, August (original), G22 v3 (latest)	Hybrid firearm: Rifle	Single-shot	FDM w/ ABS	"Matthew" (pseudonym)	.22 caliber barrel liner, metal rods, metric fasteners, springs, screws	.22 LR
Reprringer	2013, September	Primarily printed firearm: Pepper-box revolver		FDM	Hexen		.22 Short/.22 LR
Reprringer	It can hold 5 .22 caliber cartridges.; Unlike the many early 3D-printed firearm designs, which were overbuilt in order to withstand the pressures and strain on the material from modern gunpowder cartridges, the Reprringer is small and only slightly larger than an equivalent gun made from steel.						
Solid Concepts 1911 DMLS	2013, November	Weapon: Browning 1911 handgun	Semi-automatic, Short-recoil	DMLS	Solid Concepts	Springs	.45 ACP
Solid Concepts 1911 DMLS	The gun is made up of 34 3D-printed components.; Notable as the first fully metal 3D-printed firearm.						
Zig Zag revolver	2014, May	Primarily printed firearm: Revolver		FDM	Yoshitomo Imura	Metal pins, screws, rubber bands	.38 Caliber
Zig Zag revolver	Named after the German Mauser Zig-Zag revolver.; Holds six cartridges and can fire .38 caliber bullets.						
Imura Revolver	2014, September	Primarily printed firearm: Revolver		FDM	FOSSCAD members: WarFairy, Frostbyte and others	.22 caliber barrel liner	.38 Caliber
Imura Revolver	A double-action revolver that holds six cartridges.; While primarily made of plastic, it includes a steel barrel liner and chamber sleeves to increase tensile strength.						
Reason	2014, October	Weapon: M1911 pistol	Semi-automatic Recoil operation	DMLS	Solid Concepts		10mm Auto
Reason	Created roughly after a year the first-known metal 3D-printed gun was produced.; Has the word "Reason" etched on it, along with an excerpt from the Declaration of Independence on the barrel.						
XPR-1	2015, October	Weapon: Plasma Armature Railgun		FDM	David Wirth		
XPR-1	First 3D printed railgun structure.; Closed source - designs and code released to research institutions only.; Employed a mixture of traditional and additive manufacturing. Rails were traditionally machined, as well as the fasteners and electronics.						
Uses a plastic frame, slide, and fire control components with a steel barrel liner, breechblock, firing pin, and spring.; First in line of "PG22" single shot pistols and revolvers.; Individually designed, rather than built off of open-source plans.
First commercial handheld coilgun.
FGC-9 / FGC-9 MkII	2020, March 27 (MKI); 2021, April 16, (MKII)	Hybrid Firearm: Semiautomatic carbine or Short-Barreled Rifle or Pistol	Semi-automatic simple blowback	FDM	JStark1809 (DetDisp)	Steel round stock, springs, AR-15 fire control group springs, fasteners, stainless steel tubing	9×19mm Parabellum
FGC-9 / FGC-9 MkII	Based on Shuty AP-9.; No parts kit required: barrel can be rifled via Electrochemical machining (ECM).; Version two, labeled MKII, features an updated design with an H&K MP5 style charging handle.; The MKII was released to work with a string of smaller releases, including an improved barrel making process and V2 Menendez Mag. Includes the "ButWhatAboutAmmo" tutorial for fabricating ammunition.						
Thump 'n Grind	2021, July	Signaling device: Launcher		FDM	AWCY?	Steel rods, tubing, AR-15 FCG, fasteners	37mm ammunition
The Harlot	2022, February	Primarily printed firearm: Pistol	Single-shot	FDM	BAD-CAD / Black Lotus Coalition	.22 caliber barrel liner, spring, fasteners	.22 LR
The Harlot	A mostly printed .22 LR pistol. Uses a DIY metal barrel, firing pin, and spring.; Simple and extremely cheap, designed to cost $5-$8. Commonly created to be sold at gun buybacks for profit.; A large number of remixes and variants of this design have been created.						
Urutau	2024, August 20	Hybrid Firearm: Bullpup Short-Barreled Rifle or Standard Rifle	Semi-Automatic Straight-Blowback	FDM	Joseph The Parrot, A.K.A. Zé Carioca	30cm or 1ft of 12mm X 20mm or 1/2” X 3/4” steel bar stock, Stainless Steel Rods, 16mm OD 8mm ID Steel Hydraulic Pipe, springs, screws, Long or Stainless Steel pins, M3 Threaded spacers with a diameter of 5mm, 623ZZ Ball Bearings, M3 Brass Heatset Inserts	9x19mm
Urutau	While most of the underlying mechanics of The Urutau are comparable to the FGC-9 and Partisan 9, all parts were significantly redesigned.; All parts are made from easily accessible, less-firearm-related components that improve supply chain resilience and enhance the builder's operational security when sourcing materials.; Parts kits are commercially available to Americans but not required for anyone; Barrel is manufacturable with Electrochemical Machining (ECM); It uses a telescoping bolt which is pinned together and glued in place, a 3D printed fire control group/trigger designed from the ground up and CZ Scorpion magazines; Aside from the ejection port, the entire gun is ambidextrous.; Urutau incorporates safety features to manage the risk of an out-of-battery detonation.; With all necessary machines, tools, and materials on hand and the time to treat the project like a full-time job, the Urutau is manufacturable in less than a week.; The estimated minimum cost to construct a Urutau stands at around $500 for the initial gun, including printer and hardware, and $200 for each subsequent gun.; Documentation written by RSmith28 includes a guide for avoiding detection by law enforcement; Files include "The New Second Amendment", a nine-page manifesto encouraging Urutau builders "to permanently undermine global firearm prohibition"; Given the open-source nature and CC0 1.0 Universal license applied to the Urutau, many modifications to the original design have appeared online. Some of these modifications include modified grips and barrel covers.						
TZ-23, TZ-24, TZ-25	Hybrid firearm: Rifle	Select-fire	Unreleased	Hoffman Tactical, Myanmar People's Defence Force	Hoffman Tactical 1776 Remix Lower, metal rods, metric fasteners, springs, screws	5.56x45mm NATO	December 2023
Decker .380	November 28th, 2024	Fully DIY; pistol-caliber carbine	Semi-automatic simple blowback	FDM	Black Lotus Coalition	Metal .380ACP barrel or barrel liner	.380 ACP
Decker .380	At time of publication, the simplest fully DIY semiautomatic design to be released, requiring no metalworking whatsoever and utilizing only parts available worldwide.						

=== Receivers and frames ===
Receiver and frame are the parts that are legally considered a firearm and must be registered.

Name	Date made public	Type	Process	Designer	Caliber
AR Lower V5	2013, March	Receiver: AR-15 rifle lower receiver	FDM	Defense Distributed	.223 Rem/ 5.56x45
AR Lower V5	The receiver was able to handle enough stress to fire more than 600 rounds.				
Charon	May 2013	Receiver: AR-15 rifle lower receiver	FDM	WarFairy	.223 Rem/ 5.56x45
Charon	Charon V3 weighs 0.2 pounds and showed no signs of strain after 96 rounds of 5.56 AR-15 ammo were fired.				
WarFairy P-15	2013, May	Receiver: AR-15 rifle lower receiver	FDM	WarFairy	.223 Rem/ 5.56x45
Hanuman AR-15 Bullpup	2014, May	Receiver: AR-15 rifle bullpup lower receiver	FDM w/ ABS	WarFairy	.223 Rem/ 5.56x45
Hanuman AR-15 Bullpup	According to the creators, "It requires a bufferless upper to function, such as the ARAK-21 or Rock River Arms PDS Carbine, or a regular upper with a CMMG Style .22 LR Conversion installed."				
Ruger Charger	2014, July	Receiver: Ruger 10/22 semi-automatic pistol	FDM	"Buck-o-Fama" (pseudonym)	.22 Long Rifle
Ruger Charger	A pistol version of the popular Ruger 10/22 rifle.				
CM901	2015, March	Receiver: AR-10 Receiver	FDM	Printed Firearm	7.62×51mm
CM901	Based on Colt CM901.				
Lopoint / Bigpoint	2019, November (v1); 2020, November (,40/.45); 2021, May (v2)	Frame: Hi-Point pistol frame	FDM	CTRLPew / Atmac / freeman1337	9×19mm Parabellum, .380 ACP, .40 S&W, .45 ACP
Lopoint / Bigpoint	Compatible with Hi-Point C9, CF380, JCP, and JHP parts.; Extremely cheap due to the high availability of the required parts kits.				
Scz0rpion	2020, October	Receiver: CZ Scorpion Evo 3 receiver	FDM	Are We Cool Yet?	9×19mm Parabellum
Scz0rpion	First 3D printed frame to be successfully tested with 1000+ rounds full auto in one sitting without failure.				
3011 / 3011 DoubleStack/DS	2021, November; 2023, January (DoubleStack)	Receiver: 1911 based PDW	FDM	Ivan The Troll	.45 ACP, 9×19mm Parabellum, .22 TCM
3011 / 3011 DoubleStack/DS	Utilizes a 1911 slide for the upper, and an AR-15 fire control group.; An updated version, called the 3011 DoubleStack/DS, allows the use of double-stack higher capacity Remington/RIA pattern magazines. Para P14 magazines also follow Remington/RIA pattern and will work in the 3011 DS.				

=== Firearms parts and accessories ===
Name	Date made public	Type	Process	Designer	Caliber
The Cuomo Mag	January 2013	Magazine: AR-15 rifle STANAG magazine	FDM	Defense Distributed	.223 Rem/ 5.56x45
The Cuomo Mag	The magazine holds 30 rounds.; The initial prototype was created using an Objet Connex26 using VeroClear printing material (a transparent material) in order to show the magazine's round count and feeding action.; It was able to handle enough stress to fire 342 rounds and can fire 227+ rounds in quick succession.				
Feinstein AK Mag	March 2013	Magazine: AK-47 rifle magazine	FDM	Defense Distributed	7.62×39mm
Feinstein AK Mag	A 30-round AK-47 magazine.				
Red Rocket shotgun slug	May 2013	Ammunition: 12 gauge shotgun slug	FDM w/ ABS+	Jeef Hesszel	12-gauge
Red Rocket shotgun slug	During testing, the bullet penetrated a 2×12 piece of pine wood, creating a hole in a wire reel.				
3DX muzzle brake	July 2013	Muzzle device: AR-15 rifle muzzle brake	DMLS w/ Inconel	Sintercore	.223 Rem/ 5.56x45
3DX muzzle brake	Designed to tame the recoil and muzzle rise of an AR-15 semi automatic rifle chambered in 5.56×45mm NATO (.223).; It fired 7900 rounds during testing on semi-auto. During a test on full auto, 10 magazines of 62 grain green tip 5.56 rounds were fired without any issues.; In 2014 US Special Operation Command's (USSOCOM) Science and Technology Directorate invited Sintercore to demonstrate the 3DX.				
5.56×45mm/.223 rifle suppressors: 556-45 Samson (Samson suppressor replica); 556-SBR; 556-45 Suppressor	November 2013	Muzzle device: Titanium rifle suppressor	SLM w/ Titanium	Oceania Defence Ltd. and Rapid Advanced Manufacturing	.223 Rem/ 5.56x45
5.56×45mm/.223 rifle suppressors: 556-45 Samson (Samson suppressor replica); 556-SBR; 556-45 Suppressor	An additively manufactured titanium weapon suppressor. It is 50% lighter than some conventional steel suppressors.; Oceania Defense has made three variations of the 5.56mm/.223 suppressor so far: the 556-45 Samson (an AR-15 suppressor designed to operate on semi auto Short-barreled rifle to 12.5" barrels), 556-SBR (designed for hard use on 10.5" barrel for AR-15 firearms in 5.56mm/.223 ammunition) and 556-45 Suppressor (direct thread on suppressor which overlaps the barrel designed to reduce a baffle strike)				
7.62×51mm/.308 rifle suppressors: 300 BLK Long; 762-AR10; 762-G3	November 2013	Muzzle device: Titanium rifle suppressor	SLM w/ Titanium	Oceania Defence Ltd. and Rapid Advanced Manufacturing	7.62x39mm
7.62×51mm/.308 rifle suppressors: 300 BLK Long; 762-AR10; 762-G3	An additively manufactured titanium weapon suppressor.; 50% lighter than some conventional steel suppressors.; Oceania Defence made 3 variations of the 7.62mm rifle suppressor. the 300 BLK Long (designed for use with the 300 AAC Blackout cartridge in both subsonic and supersonic. It fits under the rail of a Samson or similar rail system on the AR-15-type rifle, but can to perform acceptably on bolt action 7.62×51mm/.308 rifles as well), 762-AR10 Suppressor (designed for the AR-10/LAR-8 7.62mm/.308 rifle but will also work with any bolt-action rifle in .30 caliber or less) and 762-G3 Suppressor (designed for the Heckler & Koch G3 and fits the HK91 series of 7.62mm/.308 rifles, as well as the HK33 and HK93 series of 5.56×45mm rifles).				
Small-caliber suppressors: Long version for 9mm carbines; UTU for pistols, including M1911 and 9mm	November 2013	Muzzle device: Titanium pistol suppressor	SLM w/ Titanium	Oceania Defence Ltd. and Rapid Advanced Manufacturing	9x19mm Parabellum, .45 ACP
Small-caliber suppressors: Long version for 9mm carbines; UTU for pistols, including M1911 and 9mm	Long version is designed to operate on 9×19mm Parabellum carbines firing fully automatic.; It fits under the rail of a Samson or similar rail system on the AR-15-type rifle.; This is a sealed can and is only suitable for use with jacketed bullets.; Pistol version is designed with a Neilsen which allows it to be used with most of the common John Browning tilting-barrel designs, including the swinging-linked M1911 and the cam-lock system operated Glock pistols. The Neilsen is an assembly in the aft end of the suppressor that allows the gasses to push the suppressor forward while allowing the unimpeded rearward movement of the barrel and slide assembly using a stainless steel spring and titanium piston.; It is able to function well with a wide range of ammo, although its sound reduction performs best with subsonic bullets heavier than 124 grains, with 147 or 158 grain bullets being the quietest.; It is designed to be run wet or dry, averaging 127.7–128.4 dBA with 147 grain or 127.6–134.2 dBA with 124 grain when dry and 123.1 dBA with 147 grain or 129.1 dBA with 124 grain when wet.; It is an additively manufactured titanium weapon suppressor. It is 50% lighter than some conventional steel suppressors				
The Israel drum magazine	December 2013	Magazine: AR-15 rifle 75-round STANAG drum magazine	FDM	FOSSCAD members	.223 Rem/ 5.56x45
The Israel drum magazine	A 75-round drum magazine for .223 Remington/5.56 NATO AR-15 rifles.				
The Yee drum magazine	December 2013	Magazine: AK-family drum magazine	FDM	FOSSCAD members	7.62x39mm
The Yee drum magazine	75-round drum magazine for 7.62×39mm AK-pattern rifles (e.g. AK-47, AK-102, AK-104 and compatible variants).				
SKS grip and stock	May 2014	Part: SKS rifle grip and stock	FDM	FOSSCAD members	
Škorpion vz. 61 grip and stock	May 2014	Part: Škorpion vz. 61 sub machinegun grip and stock	FDM	FOSSCAD members	
NERO 556 Muzzle brake	2018	Muzzle device: AR-15 rifle muzzle brake	DMLS w/ Inconel	Walker Defense Research	.223 Rem/ 5.56x45
NERO 556 Muzzle brake	"The idea was to create a muzzle brake with no equal; one that turns the recoil of an AR-15 into a slight push with zero muzzle rise."; Produced for 5.56x45mm (.223 Rem) or .224 Valkyrie rifles with 1/2x28 threads.				
Menendez Mag	August 2019 (v1); March 2021 (v2)	Part: Glock 17/19 Magazine	FDM	Deterrence Dispensed	9×19mm Parabellum
Menendez Mag	Dry fire testing of the v2 design suggested a lifetime of over 1000 rounds.				
'Make Glocks Full Auto' Glock Autosear	April 2020	Part: Glock autosear	FDM	digitalmaniac / FreeMenDontAsk	

== Glossary of acronyms ==
FFF
Fused filament fabrication, a process that squeezes a molten filament.
FDM
Fused deposition modeling, a trademarked term for FFF.
DMLS / SLM
Direct metal laser sintering, a process that fuses metal powder by sintering.
SLM
Selective laser melting, a process that fuses metal powder by melting.
ABS
Acrylonitrile butadiene styrene, a common thermoplastic with relatively high heat resistance.
ABSplus is a stronger, proprietary blend of ABS by Stratasys.
PLA
Polylactic acid, a bio-plastic. Easier to print, stiffer, and more brittle than other plastics.
PLA+ is a term for any blend that enhances some characteristic.
PETG
Polyethylene terephthalate (glycol-modified), a plastic made by changing the chemicals used to synthesize the more common PET. Easier to print than ABS, and moderately better heat resistance than PLA.
Often used in consumer-level printers when creators desire better heat resistance than PLA+ or need more flexibility.
ECM
Electrochemical machining, a process that uses electricity to chemically machine metal. Commonly used in 3D printed firearms to create DIY barrels with rifling, greatly increasing accuracy.

FCG

Fire control group, the trigger mechanism of a firearm. Commonly used to refer to the AR-15 fire control group.

== See also ==
- Gun control
- Gun politics in the United States
- Gun ownership
- List of modern armament manufacturers
- Improvised firearm
