= ABB plant shooting =

2010 mass shooting in Missouri, U.S.

- Location: 38°41′19.9356″N 90°15′19.8432″W; St Louis, Missouri, U.S.
- Date: 7 January 2010 c. 6:30 – c. 7:00 a.m. CST (UTC -6)
- Attack type: Spree shooting; murder–suicide; mass shooting
- Weapons: Romarm Cugir 7.62×39mm semi-automatic rifle; Hi-Point .40 S&W semi-automatic pistol; Hi-Point .45 ACP semi-automatic pistol; Tri Star 12-gauge pump-action shotgun; Third handgun
- Deaths: 4 (including the perpetrator)
- Injuries: 5
- Perpetrator: Timothy G. Hendron
- Motive: Workplace conflict

A mass shooting occurred at an ABB power plant in St Louis, Missouri, on January 7, 2010. An ABB Power employee, armed with multiple firearms, killed three and injured five others (two critically) and killed himself before police arrived.

== Shooting ==
Timothy Hendron arrived at work with an AK-47-type semi-automatic, at least two Hi-Point handguns, a pump-action shotgun, and hundreds of rounds of ammunition.

The shootings began around 6:30 a.m. local time, when Hendron opened fire inside the factory before moving outside to a parking lot near it. The first 911 call came in around 6:45 a.m., saying that a gunman was moving about the complex and that he had shot several people. Hendron fired about 100 rounds of ammunition, killing one person inside the factory and two additional people in the parking lot before heading back inside and killing himself with a shot underneath the chin.

Five people were injured in the incident, including two in critical condition. Two more were in fair condition, and the fifth person injured had been admitted to a hospital and released. Other employees took refuge on the roof of the building or in offices within the factory. During the shooting, Stephen Sharp, an employee at the facility retrieved a handgun from his car and was injured while returning fire when the gunman was aiming at a guard shack in the parking lot.

== Victims ==
The following were killed in the shooting, all from headshots:

- Carlton James Carter, 57
- Terry Joe Mabry Sr., 55
- Cory M. Wilson, 27

== Perpetrator ==
Police identified the shooter as 51-year-old Timothy Gerard Hendron (born August 2, 1958), a resident of Webster Groves, Missouri, a suburb of St. Louis, and an employee of ABB. He was known to be part of a class action lawsuit against ABB pertaining to the company's pension plan, specifically unidentified fees and expenses in employees' 401(k) accounts. People who knew Hendron said that he had been increasingly unhappy with his job at ABB, going so far as to search for a labor lawyer. Hendron was a supervisor at the factory, but was demoted after the company cancelled his shift. When he tried to earn back his position via promotion, it went to Cory Wilson, whom he later killed in the shooting. Hendron was also known to have conflicts with Wilson and other supervisors regarding his assignments and believed they were persecuting him.

== Aftermath ==
Police later found a third handgun near a guard shack. The day after the shootings, ABB released a statement mourning the deaths of its employees, including a quote from its CEO, Joe Hogan, saying in part, "I am deeply saddened by this news and would like to express my greatest sympathy to those who have been touched by this tragedy."

== See also ==
- Kirkwood City Council shooting, a similar case involving a suspect in a neighboring community.
