= Receiver (firearms) =

Firearm component that houses the operating parts of the weapon

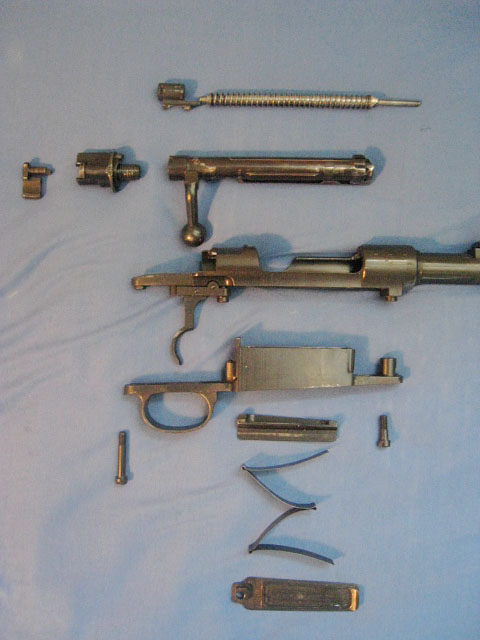
A disassembled Gewehr 98 action showing a partially disassembled receiver and bolt

In firearms terminology and law, the firearm frame or receiver is the part of a firearm which integrates other components by providing housing for internal action components such as the hammer, bolt or breechblock, firing pin and extractor, and has threaded interfaces for externally attaching ("receiving") components such as the barrel, stock, trigger mechanism and iron/optical sights. Some firearm designs, such as the AR-15 platform, feature receivers that have 2 separate sub-assemblies called the upper receiver which houses the barrel/trunnion, bolt components etc and the lower receiver (trigger mechanism housing in some cases) that holds the fire control group, pistol grip, selector, stock etc. In several court cases beginning in 2014, ATF claimed the lower of a Glock or AR-15 was the frame or receiver and the court ruled it didn't meet the legal definition. Despite this, the definition hasn't been corrected since 1986, but people are still being criminally charged.

The receiver is often made of forged, machined, or stamped steel or aluminium. Apart from these traditional materials, modern techniques have introduced polymer and sintered metal powder receivers to the market.

== Mounting ==
A barrel may typically be affixed to a firearm receiver using barrel and receiver action threads or similar methods.

== In Canadian law ==
The receiver or frame is legally the firearm, and as such it is the part that requires a manufacturer's serial number and valid Possession and Acquisition Licence to acquire and own. In the case of a handgun frame or revolver frame, it is the part that requires a Restricted-class PAL (RPAL), and registration.

== In US law ==
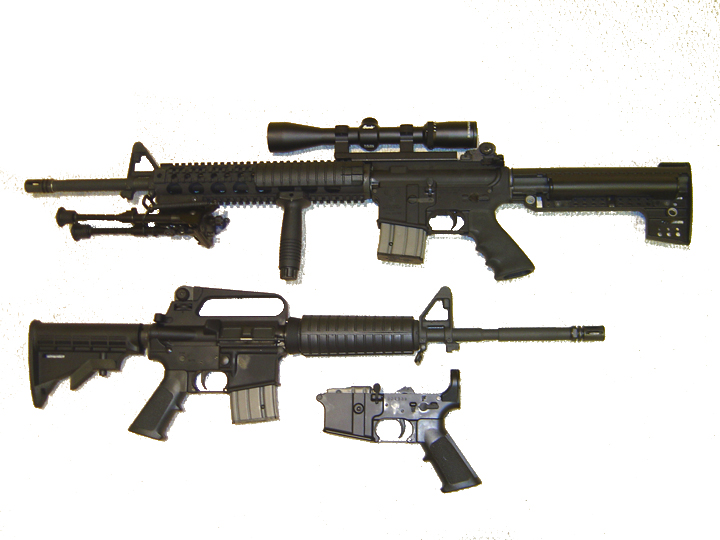
AR-15 rifles showing their configurations with different upper receivers. The lower receiver is visible at the bottom

For the purposes of United States law, the receiver or frame is legally the firearm, and as such it is the controlled part. The definition of which assembly is the legal receiver varies from firearm to firearm, under US law. Generally, the law requires licensed manufacturers and importers to mark the designated receiver with a serial number, the manufacturer or importer, the model and caliber. Makers of receivers are restricted by International Traffic in Arms Regulations. Thus, in the case of a firearm that has multiple receiver parts, such as the AR-15, which has an upper and a lower receiver, the legally controlled part is the one that is serialized.

For the AR-15 rifle, the lower receiver assembly is legally considered the actual receiver, although it is functionally a chassis that also houses the separate trigger group. In the FN-FAL rifle, it is the upper assembly that is serialized and legally considered the receiver. This has led to prosecutors dropping charges against illegal manufacturing of AR-type firearms to avoid court precedents establishing that neither the upper nor the lower receiver individually contain all the components to be legally classified as a firearm.

=== Unfinished receivers ===
"Unfinished receivers", also called "80 percent receivers", "80% lowers", or "blanks", are partially completed receivers with no serial numbers. Purchasers must perform their own finishing work in order to make the receiver usable. The finishing of receivers for sale or distribution by unlicensed persons is against US law. Because an unfinished 80% receiver is not a firearm, purchasers do not need to pass a background check. The resulting firearm is known as a "ghost gun".

During the Biden Administration, the ATF imposed regulations on the sale and marketing of unfinished receivers and kits containing them by revising the legal definition of receivers to include "a partially complete, disassembled, or nonfunctional frame or receiver, including a frame or receiver parts kit, that is designed to or may readily be completed, assembled, restored, or otherwise converted to function as a frame or receiver". (The term "receiver" was also redefined as referring to non-handgun firearms, while "frame" was redefined as referring to handguns exclusively.) The new definitions went into effect on August 24, 2022. In the case VanDerStok v. Garland, filed on June 30, 2023, a federal judge in the United States District Court for the Northern District of Texas ruled that the new ATF regulations exceeded the agency's statutory authority, and struck them down. However, on August 8, 2023, the Texas court's nationwide vacatur was temporarily placed on hold by the Supreme Court of the United States, leaving the new ATF regulations on unfinished receivers in place.

The case was appealed to the United States Court of Appeals for the Fifth Circuit in November of 2023, with a three-judge panel upholding the District Court's ruling that the ATF had exceeded their statutory authority, striking the rule down; although the Supreme Court once again issued an emergency order allowing the ATF to continue enforcing the regulation while the litigation proceeded. On April 22, 2024 the case of Bondi v. VanDerStok was accepted on appeal to the Supreme Court of the United States, and on March 26, 2025 in a 7-2 decision, the court upheld the Biden-era regulation, holding that "weapons parts kits are firearms within the scope of the Gun Control Act" and affirmed the government’s authority to regulate them as such. This vacated the Fifth Circuit's ruling, allowing the ATF rule to remain in place. However, the Court's ruling did not outlaw all unfinished frames and receivers that are unserialized, it only applies to "certain partially complete frames or receivers sold in weapon part kits, which include everything needed to quickly assemble a working handgun", therefore the ruling primarily applies to 80% pistol frames bundled in kits. Unfinished AR lowers are still legal under the Court's ruling, so long as they are sold individually and not as part of a kit with jigs and instructions, and 76% pistol frames are still legal. As of March, 2026 unfinished AR lowers and 76 percent pistol frames are still being legally sold by companies like 80 Percent Arms and 80-Lowers.

After the U.S. Supreme Court sent the case back, the case continued as Defense Distributed v. Blanche. On August 17, 2026, the district court held that the rule's treatment of partially complete frames, receivers and weapon parts kits is unconstitutional under the Second Amendment and void for vagueness under the Fifth Amendment. The court ruled that 27 C.F.R. 478.11 and 478.12(c) cannot be enforced against Defense Distributed, the Second Amendment Foundation or any of its current or future members. It enjoined enforcement against them as to Defense Distributed's M1911 80% frames and G80 build kit, unfinished receiver and grip module. The court rejected the plaintiffs claims under the Administrative Procedure Act.

==== State Bans ====
A number of states have passed laws making "ghost guns" illegal by banning the sale of unfinished firearm frames and receivers, and the possession of unserialized firearms. As of March 26, 2026, unfinished frames and receivers, aka "80 percent lowers", and unserialized "ghost guns", are illegal in the following United States jurisdictions:

- California
- Colorado
- Connecticut
- Delaware
- District of Columbia
- Hawaii
- Illinois
- Maine
- Maryland
- Massachusetts
- Nevada
- New Jersey
- New York
- Oregon
- Puerto Rico
- Rhode Island
- Vermont
- Washington
- Philadelphia, PA

== 3D printed receivers ==
As of 2024, several designs and at least two designs for 3D printable polymer lower unfinished receivers for the AR-15 have been released: the AR Lower V5 and the Charon. 3D printed designs may also be used to produce privately made firearms.

Name	Date made public	Type	Process	Designer	Caliber
AR Lower V5	2013, March	Receiver: AR-15 rifle lower receiver	FDM	Defense Distributed	.223 Rem/ 5.56×45
AR Lower V5	The receiver was able to handle enough stress to fire more than 600 rounds.				
Charon	May 2013	Receiver: AR-15 rifle lower receiver	FDM	WarFairy	.223 Rem/ 5.56×45
Charon	Charon V3 weighs 0.2 pounds and showed no signs of strain after 96 rounds of 5.56 AR-15 ammo were fired.				
WarFairy P-15	2013, May	Receiver: AR-15 rifle lower receiver	FDM	WarFairy	.223 Rem/ 5.56×45
Hanuman AR-15 Bullpup	2014, May	Receiver: AR-15 rifle bullpup lower receiver	FDM w/ ABS	WarFairy	.223 Rem/ 5.56×45
Hanuman AR-15 Bullpup	According to the creators, "It requires a bufferless upper to function, such as the ARAK-21 or Rock River Arms PDS Carbine, or a regular upper with a CMMG Style .22 LR Conversion installed."				
Ruger Charger	2014, July	Receiver: Ruger 10/22 semi-automatic pistol	FDM	"Buck-o-Fama" (pseudonym)	.22 Long Rifle
Ruger Charger	A pistol version of the popular Ruger 10/22 rifle.				
CM901	2015, March	Receiver: AR-10 Receiver	FDM	Printed Firearm	7.62×51mm
CM901	Based on Colt CM901.				
Lopoint / Bigpoint	2019, November (v1); 2020, November (,40/.45); 2021, May (v2)	Frame: Hi-Point pistol frame	FDM	CTRLPew / Atmac / freeman1337	9×19mm Parabellum, .380 ACP, .40 S&W, .45 ACP
Lopoint / Bigpoint	Compatible with Hi-Point C9, CF380, JCP, and JHP parts.; Extremely cheap due to the high availability of the required parts kits.				
Scz0rpion	2020, October	Receiver: CZ Scorpion Evo 3 receiver	FDM	Are We Cool Yet?	9×19mm Parabellum
Scz0rpion	First 3D printed frame to be successfully tested with 1000+ rounds full auto in one sitting without failure.				
3011 / 3011DS	2021, November; 2023, January (DS)	Receiver: 1911 based PDW	FDM	Deterrence Dispensed	.45 ACP, 9×19mm Parabellum, .22 TCM
3011 / 3011DS	Utilizes a 1911 slide for the upper, and an AR-15 fire control group.; An updated version, called the 3011DS, allows the use of double-stack higher capacity Remington and RIA magazines.				
3DPD10	2023, April	Frame: Pistol frame	FDM	Avidity Arms	9×19mm Parabellum
3DPD10	A 3D-printable frame for the Avidity Arms PD10.; This design is notable as the first firearm released by commercial company designed to be 3D printed.				
