= The Cuomo Mag =

3D-printed rifle magazine

The Cuomo Mag is a 3D printed AR-15 magazine named after the Governor of New York, Andrew Cuomo, who signed the NY SAFE Act into law banning magazines capable of holding more than 10 rounds of ammunition. It was created by Defense Distributed and made public around January 2013

The initial prototype was created using the Objet Connex26 using VeroClear printing material (a transparent material) in order to show the magazine’s round count and feeding action via the Fused deposition modeling (FDM) method.

The magazine holds 30 rounds and was able to handle enough stress to fire 227+ bullets while swapping out the barrels on the rifle to keep them cool. In a test at a gun range near Austin, Texas, Defense Distributed fired a total of 342 rounds using the magazine with no issues.

== Initial prototype and final product ==
The magazine was created with the Objet Connex26 with VeroClear (a transparent material) so the rounds and feeding action could be observed. It was not a success, in trials they managed to fire five rounds before the magazine failed.

The main problem was feeding the gun, to solve the issue, the team added graphite to the inside of the magazine’s body, modified the catch slot, and sanded the magazine once again. The final prototype was able to handle the train to fire 50 rounds, and remained intact. but Defense Distributed said that though the magazine was beginning to distort from the heat, it could last beyond 100 rounds.

At the time (January 2012) prices for traditional magazines were up five times from their standard price, and it was noted that disposable 3D-printed alternatives could provide a cheaper solution for gun owners.

According to Forbes and the Wired magazine the AR-15 Cuomo magazine created by Defense Distributed which fired 227+ bullets was created using a Stratasys Dimension SST 3-D printer.

== See also ==
- List of notable 3D printed weapons and parts
