= Grizzly 2 =

Grizzly 2 may refer to:

- Grizzly II: Revenge, 1983 film
- Grizzly 2.0, an early 3D-printed rifle
