= Reprringer =

3D printed firearm

The Reprringer is a 3D printed pepperbox firearm, made public around September 2013. It is a 5-shot, single-action, manually-indexed .22 CB Cap revolver.

== Design ==
Unlike the many early 3D-printed firearm designs, which are usually massively overbuilt in order to withstand the pressures and strain on the material from modern gunpowder cartridges, the Reprringer is small and only slightly larger than a gun made from steel. It is chambered for .22 CB Cap which is considered the least powerful commercially produced cartridge on the market. The barrels are not rifled, the lack of theoretical accuracy is considered a non-issue in a small gun with no sights.

== See also ==
- List of notable 3D printed weapons and parts
