= AR Lower V5 =

The AR Lower V5 is a 3D printed lower receiver for the AR-15 rifle. It was created in March 2013 Defense Distributed printed using the Stratasys Dimension SST 3-D printer using the fused deposition modeling (FDM) method.

The receiver was able to handle enough stress to fire more than 600 rounds. Defense Distributed stated "actual count of the new SLA lower was 660+ on day 1 with the SLA lower. The test ended when we ran out of ammunition, but this lower could easily withstand 1,000 rounds."

== See also ==
- List of notable 3D printed weapons and parts
