= WarFairy P-15 =

The WarFairy P-15 is a 3D printed Fabrique Nationale P90 stock made public around May 2013. It was printed using a LulzBot Taz printer via the fused deposition modeling (FDM) method. It was created by WarFairy

The stock works a lower receiver for the FN-P90 but would work with any standard AR.

It is an offspring of the Charon open source project, which was a 3D-printable AR-15 lower receiver project that was partially inspired by the P90. It began as a design exercise by a DEFCAD user to explore FDM additive manufacturing technology as a means of integrating the P90's ergonomics into a stock for the AR-15, resulting in the WarFairy P-15 stock set.

== See also ==
- List of notable 3D printed weapons and parts
