= 3DX =

3D printed metal muzzle brake

The 3DX, also known as the Auxetik, was the first 3D printed metal muzzle brake and the first 3D printed metallic component for a firearm. It is meant for the highly customisable AR-15 rifle. The design was made public around July 2013. The printer used to print it is unknown but the brake was created using the Direct metal laser sintering (DMLS) method by Sintercore (a weapons manufacturing startup company). It is designed to tame the recoil and muzzle rise of AR-15 pistols chambered for .223 caliber (5.56×45mm) NATO rounds. The Auxetik was renamed to 3DX by Sintercore.

It uses metal Inconel material and as of 2014 the company was selling each one for around $300.

== Specifications ==
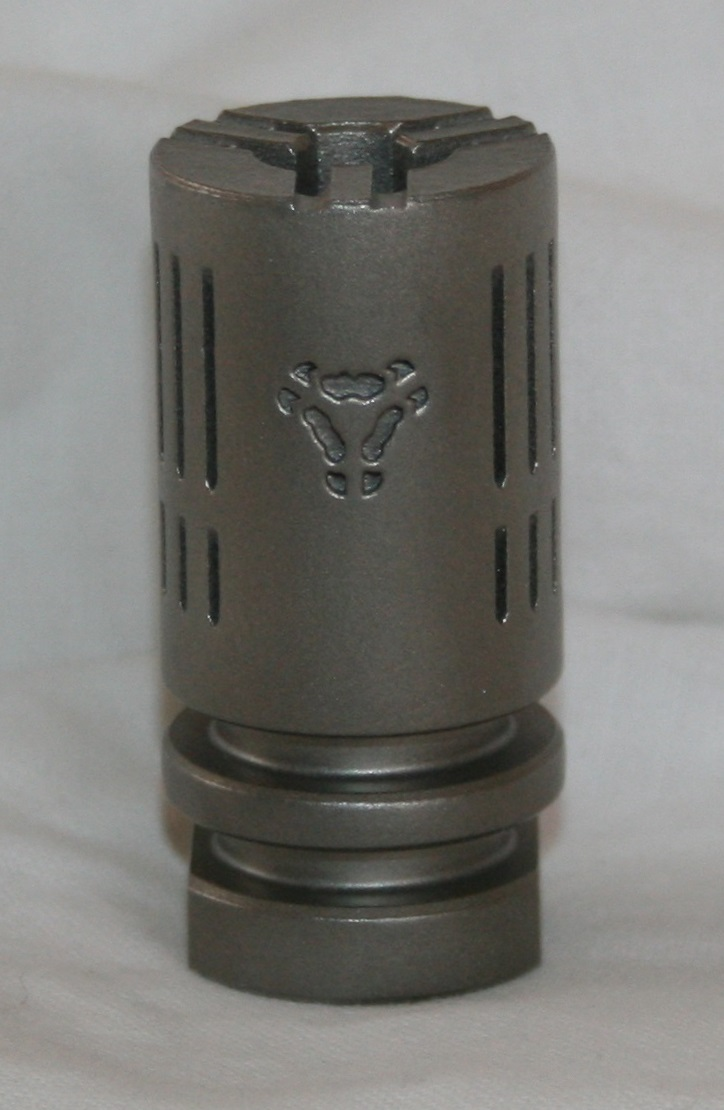
Early Sintercore 3DX (without Ionbond Diamondblack coating added in later iterations).

The 3DX is the first 3D printed muzzle brake available for commercial sale with muzzle control on semi-automatic and fully automatic. It uses 100% Inconel superalloy construction and Ionbond Diamondblack coating. The threading is 1/2×28RH for 5.56×45mm NATO, .223 Remington, and smaller calibers. The brake comes with installation instructions and a crush washer.

== Performance ==
It survived the firing of 7900 rounds during testing on semi-auto. During a test on full auto, 10 magazines of 62 grain green tip 5.56 rounds were all fired without any issues.

Thefirearmblog tested the item on the first, sixth, and 12th month of their experiment, then checked the interior using a USB microscope. They claim that there was no "discernible difference in performance over that year, there was no muzzle rise to speak of and no increase in report when firing".

== United States military interest ==
US Special Operation Command’s (USSOCOM) Science and Technology Directorate at MacDill Air Force Base invited Neal Brace (the owner of Sintercore) to demonstrate the newly named 3DX muzzle brake for possible use by its elite troops using an "ARES Defense AMG-1 and AMG-2 belt fed machine gun with a 13-inch barrel feeding from a 200-round box magazine". Testing was done on August the 5th 2014 by special operations troops on a closed range. All the testing was carried out with the ARES AMG-1 and 2.

== See also ==
- List of notable 3D printed weapons and parts
