= Solid Concepts =

- Type: Private
- Industry: Custom Manufacturing
- Founded: Valencia, California, United States, 1991
- Founder: Joe Allison
- Headquarters: Valencia, California, United States
- Number of locations: Los Angeles, CA, San Diego, CA, Phoenix, AZ, Tucson, AZ, Austin, TX, Detroit, MI
- Area served: United States, Canada, China, Brazil
- Products: 3D Printed prototypes & parts, injection molded parts, cast urethanes, high quality plastics & metals
- Services: Rapid Prototyping, Direct Digital Manufacturing, Tooling & Injection Molding
- Number of employees: +400
- Divisions: Additive Manufacturing/ Rapid Prototyping, Cast Urethanes, Composites, Tooling & Injection Molding
- Subsidiaries: ZoomRP.com
- Website: www.solidconcepts.com

Solid Concepts, Inc. is an additive manufacturing service provider and a major manufacturer of business products, aerospace, unmanned systems, medical equipment, foundry cast patterns, industrial equipment and design, and transportation parts. The company is headquartered in Valencia, California, and has six other facilities in the United States, including manufacturing facilities in Troy, Michigan, Austin, Texas, Phoenix and Tucson, Arizona, and Poway, California. They also have a partnership in China.

== History ==
Solid Concepts Inc. was founded by former 3D Systems engineers Joe Allison, Schuyler Mitchell, and Ray Bradford in 1991. It derives its name from its original focus on rapid prototyping through 3D printing (or additive manufacturing) with the idea that virtual concepts can be printed into solid reality.

The Solid Concepts logo originally featured layered lines comprising a "S" beside a "C" to represent layered manufacturing, but has since removed the layered lines, in order to better represent its composite, urethane, and tooling capabilities.

Solid Concepts expanded throughout the United States, especially during the late 1990s and early 2000s, opening facilities in Austin, TX, Poway, CA, and Phoenix, AZ.

Joe Allison has been awarded the Distinguished Innovator Operator Awards, known as DINOs, by the Additive Manufacturing Users Group (AMUG) for innovation in laser sintering technology.

In 2001, Solid Concepts hired former AARK employee Jeff Lemker, who headed the evolution of cast urethane products at the company. Lemker led QuantumCast™ Cast Urethanes, a proprietary casting process that involves heat and pressure to enhance the properties of the urethanes during casting. The casting process has found use in the medical industry.

In 2008, Solid Concepts branded and trademarked ID-Light, which is a method of printing SLA and FDM parts that is 1/12 the weight of regular SLA and FDM parts. The process has allowed lighter props for movies involving huge set pieces, such as the robots in Real Steel.

Solid Concepts was ranked in the top twenty manufacturing companies in the greater San Fernando Valley by San Fernando Business Journal in 2007.

In 2013, the National Additive Manufacturing Innovation Institute (NAMII) recognized a FDM 3D Printed duct manufactured by Solid Concepts. The air duct has been awarded a place in the visitors center at the facility with the purpose of immersing visitors in the evolution of additive manufacturing technology.

In late 2013, the company demonstrated a 3D printed version of an M1911 pistol made of metal, the 1911DMLS, using an industrial 3D printer.

=== Acquisitions ===
In 2006, Solid Concepts acquired a model shop from Raytheon in Tucson, AZ, thus beginning their tooling and molding department.

In 2008, Solid Concepts purchased former composites manufacturing company, Composite Tooling Technologies, to further develop a composites line. The acquisition facilitated a $1 million project for large MRI equipment.

On April 2, 2014, Stratasys announced that they had entered into definitive agreements to acquire Solid Concepts and Harvest Technologies, which will be combined with RedEye, its existing digital manufacturing service business, to establish a single additive manufacturing services business unit. The acquisition was finalized on July 15, 2014.

== Products and technologies ==
Solid Concepts manufactures products for a range of industries, including aerospace, business consumer, medical, and transportation. The company manufactures architectural models, prototypes, anatomical models, and investment casting patterns for metal castings using QuickCast SLA. The company largely focused on prototypes during their early years, but have since branched out to manufacture large composite equipment for industrial use, tooling and injection molding, end-use cast urethanes, metals and a range of high quality plastics.

Solid Concepts offers the services of 3D printing, composites, urethanes, tooling and injection molding rather than selling machines and equipment. Their additive manufacturing services include stereolithography (SLA), PolyJet, Z-Corp Color 3D Prints, fused deposition modeling (FDM), direct metal laser sintering (DMLS), and selective laser sintering (SLS). The company also provides Computer Numerical Controlled (CNC) machining, composites, advanced cast urethanes, and injection molding and tooling.

- Cast urethanes: By reinforcing urethanes with composites and epoxies, the company manufactures urethane prototypes, models, and industrial strength end-use products.
- Composites: Composites, largely focused at the company's Troy, MI, facility, facilitate industrial strength components used in MRI and medical casings, recreational vehicles, and marine craft. Composites also afford RF Transparency protective equipment, valuable in the medical industry.
- Computer numerical controlled (CNC) machining: CNC machining/milling has virtually no material limitation. Solid Concepts incorporates their CNC machining centers for the production of Master Patterns for QuantumCast Cast Urethane products that may require a long mold life.
- Stereolithography / 3D printing: SLA is the technology that started the company back in 1991. SLA is used to create prototypes, master patterns for investment casting, patterns for cast urethanes, art, and more. As it is a photocurable liquid resin process, the company is able to build large parts by bonding smaller segments. PolyJet is used in similar functions requiring tighter tolerances and smaller builds. SLS and FDM are 3D Printing processes that afford high quality plastics viable in end-use products, while also being used for prototypes. DMLS is viable for metal parts requiring geometries that cannot easily be milled.
- Tooling and injection molding: Injection mold tooling involves machining a mold — a core and cavity — that is used to produce thermoplastic, injected mold parts. The Core and Cavity are created in a variety of metals, typically different compositions of steel. Injection Molded parts are produced via Injection Mold Tooling to fabricate plastic parts. The process involves an injection molding machine, raw plastic material, and the mold (Core and Cavity). Medical, transportation, aerospace, office equipment, consumer products, industrial products, and electronics are a few of the industries that use high volumes of tooling and injection molding. Solid Concepts offers offshore and domestic tooling options.

=== Applications and industries ===
Solid Concepts' services are utilized during early prototyping and design, market testing, and low to mass volume production. Solid Concepts' material offerings include durable thermoplastics, resins, nylons, and metals for uses ranging from large components and ducts in aerospace to RF Transparency protective equipment in the medical industry.

Industry specific applications include:

- Aerospace: Complex shapes requiring durable plastics in ailerons, air ducts, attachments and inserts; prototypes for testing new methods of reducing aircraft noise or drag. Typical technologies: SLS with PEEK material, FDM with Ultem material
- Architecture: Design configurations; testing, form and fit; models for intricate designs. Typical technologies: SLS, PolyJet, SLA
- Automotive: Large industrial equipment casings; gas tanks requiring complex conformity; diffusers; plenums. Typical technologies: FDM, SLS
- Design firms: Art models; design intentions and garnering customer interest. Typical technologies include: SLS, PolyJet, SLA, Z-Corp, FDM, and cast urethanes
- Foundries: Specialized QuickCast SLA processes; QuickCast's drainable inner matrices are due to low and stable viscosity, high green strength, and low water absorption which mitigates in-vat swelling
- Medical: equipment casings; MRI coils; RF Transparency barriers; anatomical models. Typical technologies: cast urethanes, FDM, SLA, composites
- Unmanned Vehicles: casings and complex pieces for unmanned aerial vehicles and remotely operated underwater vehicles. Typical technologies: SLS, FDM, and cast urethanes

== See also ==
- List of notable 3D printed weapons and parts
