= Hi-Point carbine =

American pistol carbine

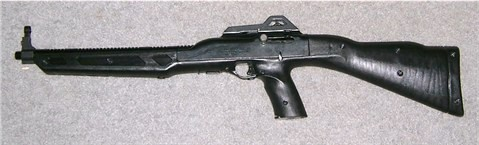
- First Generation Hi-Point-995 Carbine
- Type: Carbine, Pistol-caliber carbine
- Place of origin: United States

Production history
- Designer: Tom Deeb
- Designed: Hi-Point Firearms
- Produced: 1994-present
- Variants: 995, 995TS, 995P, 4095, 4095TS, 4595, 4595TS, 4595P, 1095TS, 1095P, 3895TS, 3095TS

Specifications
- Mass: (995) 5.75 lb (2.6 kg) (4095) 7 lb (3.2 kg)
- Length: 32.5 in (830 mm)
- Barrel length: (995) 16.5 in (420 mm) (4095) 17.5 in (440 mm)
- Cartridge: 9×19mm Parabellum, .40 S&W, 10mm Auto, .45 ACP, .380 ACP, .30 Super Carry
- Action: Blowback
- Muzzle velocity: 9×19mm NATO, 1,400 feet per second (~427 metre per second)
- Feed system: 5, 10, 15 and 20 round detachable box magazines
- Sights: hooded front, rear adjustable aperture

The Hi-Point carbine is a series of pistol-caliber carbines manufactured by Hi-Point Firearms. Their polymer and alloy construction and simple direct blowback action make them cheap to manufacture and purchase.

== Origin ==
Developed during the 1994 Federal Assault Weapons Ban, the Hi-Point carbine comes with a ten-round magazine that fits into the pistol grip. With the expiration of the federal assault weapons ban in 2004, aftermarket third-party 15- and 20-round magazines were created.

The proprietary magazines are usable only with Hi-Point firearms. The pistol-style magazines for the 4095 .40 S&W carbine are fully interchangeable with the Hi-Point .40 S&W pistol. No such compatibility was advertised by Hi-Point regarding the original 995 carbine and the 9mm Hi-Point C-9 pistol; owners of both designs have reported that they are not completely interchangeable. The 8 shot pistol magazine is too short to fit the carbine; however, the 10 shot carbine magazine will fit into the pistol but extends past the bottom of the grip.

== Development ==
In the first quarter of 2009, a new model of the 995 carbine was released, the 995TS, which features a new stock and last round hold open. The TS model is slightly more expensive than the "995 Classic," affectionately known as "the Planet of the Apes gun." The 4095 model in .40 S&W and the newest model, the Model 4595 in .45 ACP, are available only in the new TS configuration. As of September 2010, the "4095 Classic" is no longer featured on the Hi-Point website.

As of November 2017, Hi-Point has put into production a new carbine in 10mm Auto. Based on the Model 4595TS, the Model 1095TS functions similarly to the 4595TS, with a 10 round single-stack magazine and a telescoping bolt in a blowback action.

The Hi-Point carbines have a variety of aftermarket accessories. Hi-Point manufactures a muzzle brake and laser system for the first generation models. Various companies manufacture accessories and attachments for the second generation of 995. The 995TS features picatinny rails and an improved design allowing for more versatility and modularity compared to the first generation 995.

== Models ==
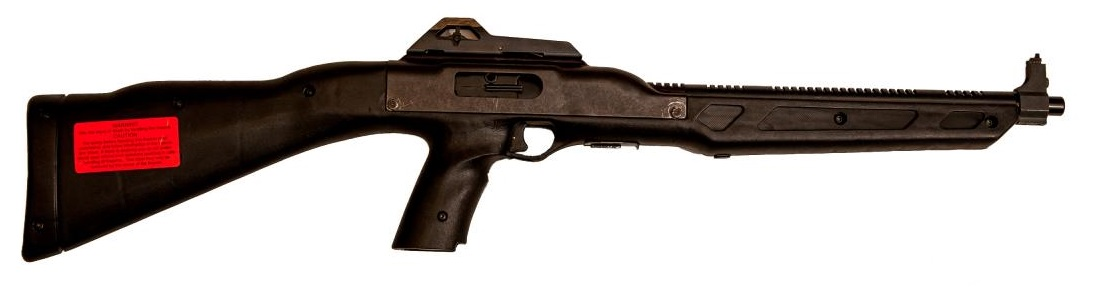
First Generation Hi-Point 995 Carbine (9mm)

Carbines:

- 995 (9mm)
- 3895 (.380 ACP)
- 1095 (10mm Auto)
- 4095 (.40 S&W)
- 4595 (.45 ACP)
- 3095 (.30 Super Carry)

Pistols:

- 995P (9mm)
- 1095P (10mm Auto)
- 4595P (.45 ACP)

== Legality ==
The Hi Point Carbine has since been designated an assault weapon in the State of Connecticut with the April 4, 2013 signing of Public Act 13-3. It has been similarly designated by the State of New York with the signing of the NY SAFE Act and as of mid-2013, purchase of any of the unaltered carbines has been restricted to law enforcement officers. In 2014, a company developed a shield that prevents the firearm operator from wrapping their hand around the pistol grip. With the shield fitted, the grip no longer meets the SAFE Act's definition of a pistol grip, so Hi-Point carbines with the shield are legal to own in New York state.

== Popularity ==
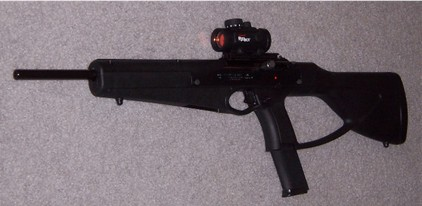
Hi-Point 995 with Advanced Technology, Inc. stock and 15-round magazine.

The carbine was listed as the seventh most popular pistol caliber carbine in 2019. Some 28,000 were made and sold in 1998 alone, and it continues to sell well. After the success of the 9mm Model 995, the Model 4095 was created in the .40 S&W caliber. It shares much of the success of the Model 995. The Model 4595TS is a success and shares the popularity of the smaller-caliber versions.

Hi-Point carbines consistently scored high in evaluations run by Gun Tests Magazine.

The Hi-Point Carbine was one of the firearms used by Eric Harris during the Columbine High School massacre.

== See also ==
- Hi-Point Firearms
- Hi-Point CF-380
- Hi-Point C-9 and C-9 Comp
- Hi-Point Model 40SW
- Hi-Point Model JHP
