= Feinstein AK Mag =

3D printed magazine for the AK-47 rifle

The Feinstein AK Mag is a 3D printed magazine for the AK-47 rifle. It was created by Defense Distributed and made public in March 2013. The magazine was created using a Stratasys Dimension SST 3-D printer via the fused deposition modeling (FDM) method.

It is a 30-round 7.62×39 AK-47 magazine. It is named after Dianne Feinstein, a congresswoman who has introduced gun control bills in the US Congress. Cody Wilson, the founder of Defense Distributed, said the magazine's name is a symbol of what's happening in congress and reflects Defense Distributed's belief the proposed ban on assault weapons by Dianne Feinstein will fail. The original prototype was able to withstand 60 rounds before it began to crack.

== See also ==
- List of notable 3D printed weapons and parts
