= Hi-Point Model JXP =

Semi-automatic pistol

Hi-Point Model JXP 10mm
- Type: Pistol
- Place of origin: United States

Production history
- Manufacturer: Hi-Point Firearms
- Produced: 2023-present

Specifications
- Mass: 32 oz (910 g)
- Length: 7.72 inches (196 mm)
- Barrel length: 4.5 inches (110 mm)
- Cartridge: 10mm Auto
- Action: Blowback
- Feed system: 10-round detachable box magazine
- Sights: Blade front, adjustable notch rear

The Hi-Point Model JXP is a polymer-framed, semi-automatic, blowback-operated pistol manufactured by Hi-Point Firearms.

Introduced in 2023, It is chambered in 10mm.

== Features ==
- Polymer frame with an integral accessory rail
- Black powder coat finish
- Three-dot sights, fully adjustable rear sight (windage and elevation adjustable); optional ghost ring sight
- Quick on and off thumb safety
- Magazine disconnect safety
- Last round hold open

== See also ==
- Model JCP, a similar pistol chambered in .40 S&W
- Model JHP, a similar pistol chambered in .45 ACP
