= Hanuman AR-15 Bullpup =

Open source 3D-printable gun

The Hanuman AR-15 Bullpup which was made public in May 2014 is a prototype AR-15 rifle Bullpup created by WarFairy.

According to the creators "It requires a bufferless upper to function, such as the ARAK-21 or Rock River Arms PDS Carbine, or a regular upper with a CMMG Style .22LR Conversion installed." Portions of the finished rifle are designed to be printed using ABS plastic.

== Specification ==
The configuration at the top is with a SBR upper with a length of 20 inches with the configuration below consisting of a 16 inch upper with a length of 26.5 inches. The initial a prototype lacks a safety and adjustable outside of interchangeable butt pads, but the creators say "it should work without issue".

The lower receiver weighs 1.45 pounds when created using ABS plastic material, the creators estimate the "material cost will be between 20 and 40 dollars depending on the cost of your material".

WarFairy stated that the later versions will include a safety. Like the Charon, the Hanuman’s components were designed and meant to be printed individually, to allow those with small 3D printers to print the device.

== Name ==
The creators decided to name the lower receiver after the Hindu deity Hanuman. The CAD files needed to print the Hanuman were made available at defcad.com, a website created by Cody Wilson founder of Defense Distributed.

== Test fire ==
WarFairy claims that test receivers have fired over 600 rounds without breaking and still function, and that it showed no signs of stress.

== See also ==
- List of 3D-printed weapons and parts
