= Ruger Charger (3D printed) =

Open source 3D-printable gun

The Ruger Charger (3D printed) is a 3D printed copy of the Ruger 10/22 Charger semi-automatic pistol's receiver made public in July 2014. It was created by a gunmaker who goes by the pseudonym Buck O'Fama.

It was printed using a small format 3D printer, the creator did not reveal the name of the printer. It was printed via the Fused deposition modeling (FDM) method. The Charger is the pistol version of the popular Ruger 10/22 rifle, and comes standard with 10-round flush magazines and can also accept high-capacity magazines including 30 rounds or more. According to Ammoland, a video of the weapon was "posted on July 4th 2014, Independence Day, from somewhere in the State of Nevada. It is interesting that in spite of the fact that the poster did nothing illegal, they felt compelled to disguise their voice".

== Composition ==
The entire gun was not 3D printed, only the receiver was 3D printed. The other parts were purchased from the internet and did not require any legal paperwork.

Buck O'Fama claims that the receiver was printed using an inexpensive, small format 3D printer, in 2 sections, and then those sections were crazy-glued together.

== Test fire ==
In the video the creator posted online showing a test firing of the device, the creator is shown successfully firing 30 rounds using the weapon. According to 3Dprint at the end of the video, Buck O'Fama makes the following declaration: "You may not condone the activity, but the fact remains that we are now living in a time when deadly weapons can be printed with the push of a button. The notion that any item so easily created could be eradicated from the earth is pure fantasy. The capacity to defend my family is a fundamental human right. If you take my gun, I will simply print another one."

== See also ==
- List of 3D-printed weapons and parts
