= Solid Concepts 1911 DMLS =

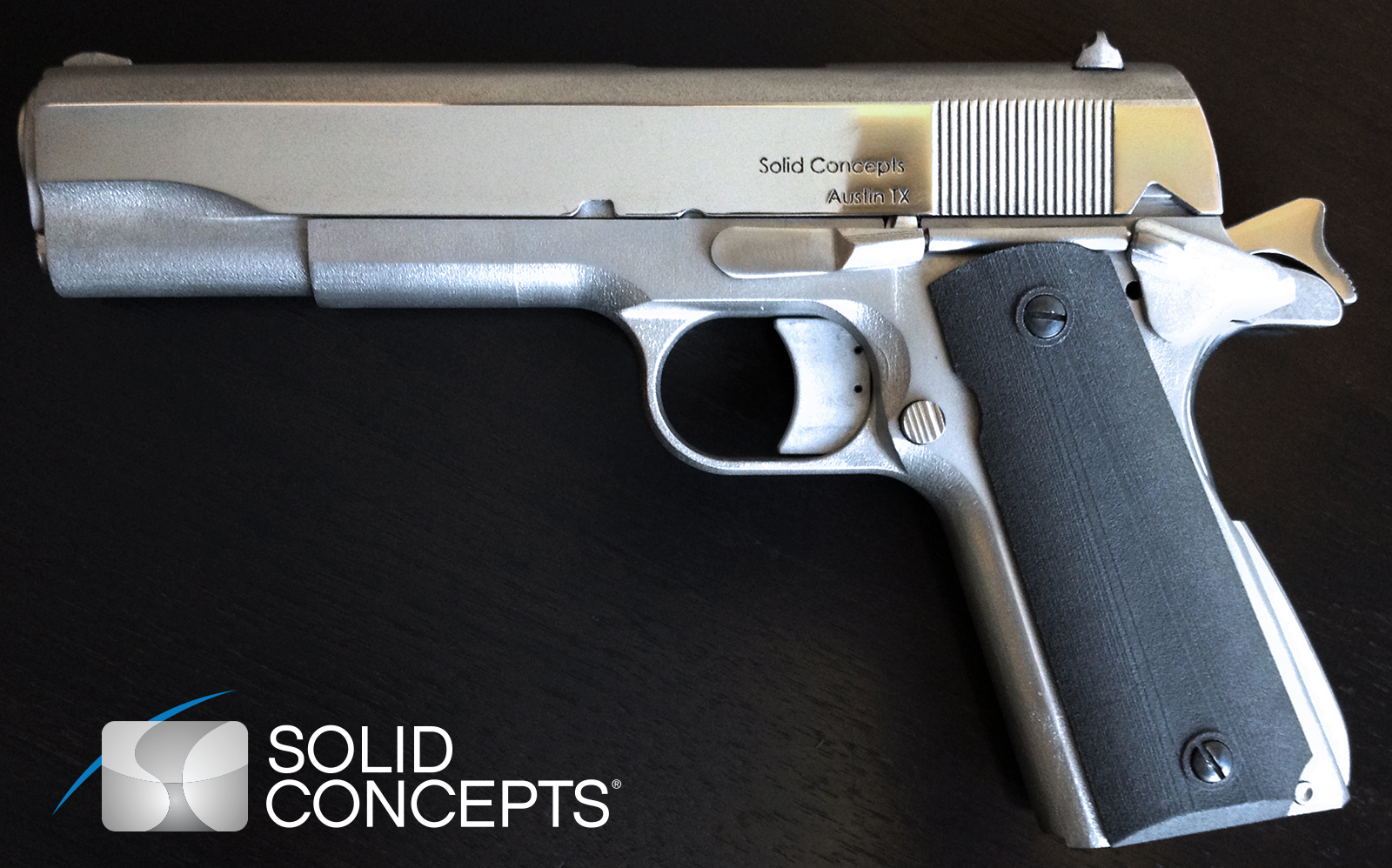
- The Solid Concepts 3D printed 1911 pistol
- Type: Semi-automatic pistol
- Place of origin: United States

Production history
- Designer: John Browning
- Designed: 1911 (original design) / 2013 (3D printed version)
- Manufacturer: Solid Concepts
- Produced: 2013

Specifications
- Cartridge: .45 ACP
- Action: Short recoil operation
- Feed system: 7-round standard detachable box magazine

The Solid Concepts 1911 DMLS is a 3D printed improvised firearm version of the M1911 pistol. It was made public around November 2013 and was printed via the direct metal laser sintering (DMLS) method. It was created by Solid Concepts. The first gun, version 1.0, is made up of 34 3D-printed 17-4 stainless steel components.

== Design ==
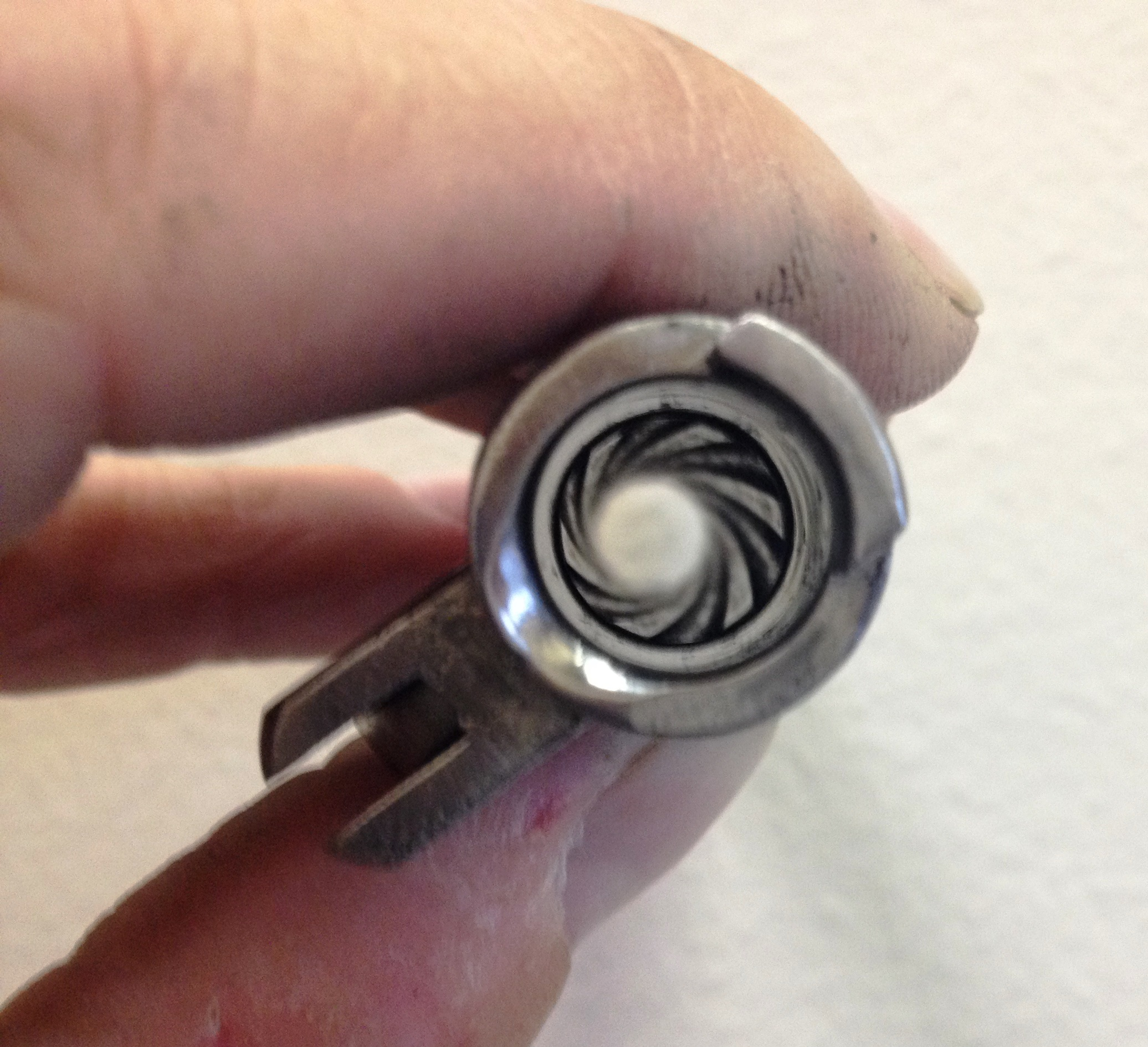
Looking from the “Chamber end” of the Solid Concepts 3D printed barrel

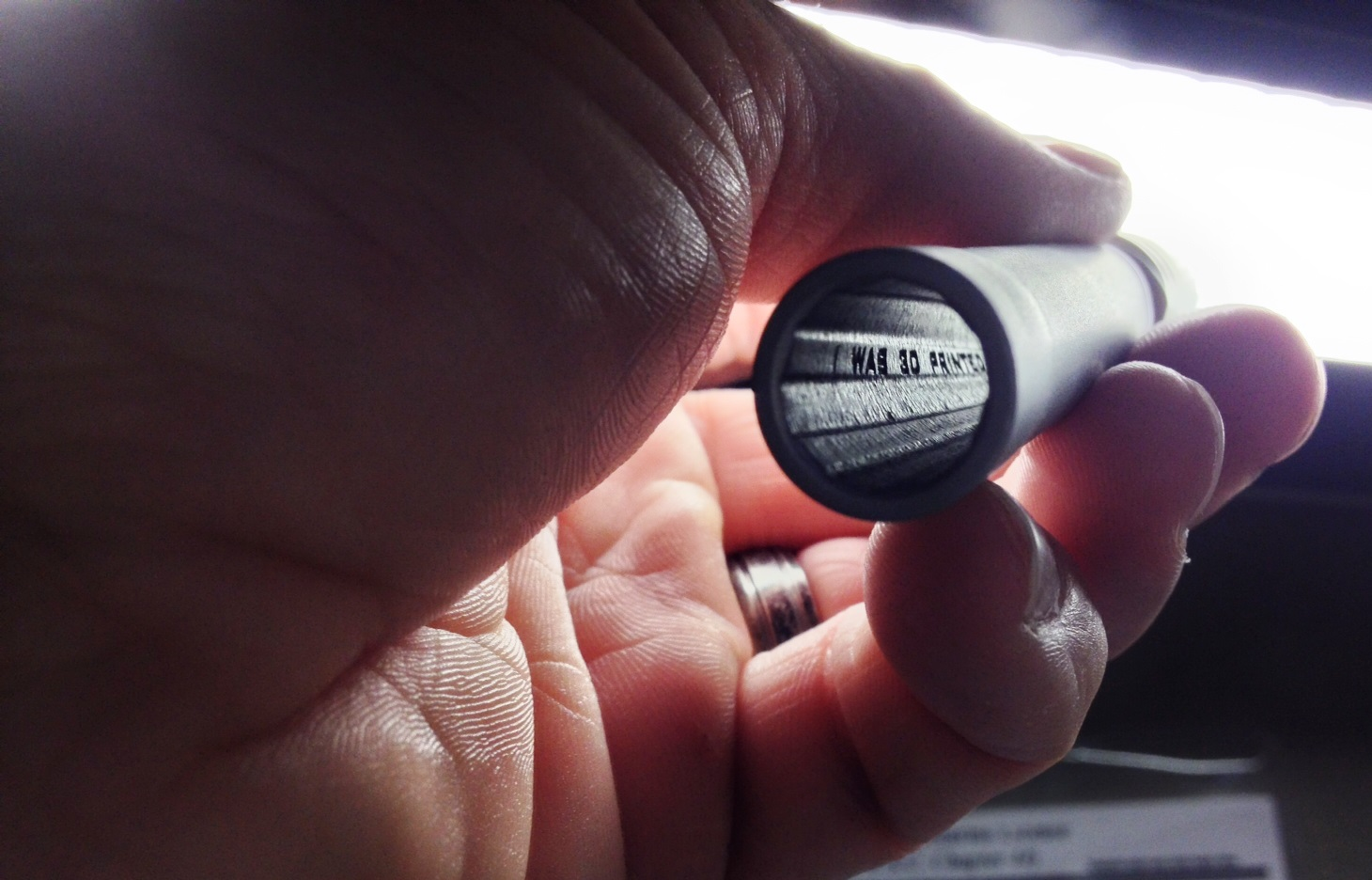
The ability to place text inside the barrel is possible with 3D printing

The 1911 DMLS weighs 2.25 pounds (1.02 kg) when it is empty i.e is not filled with a magazine and the trigger pull weighs 5 pounds-force (22 N). The width is 1.3 inches (33 mm) wide. The sight radius is 6.4 inches (160 mm) and consists of a standard GI with a square notch rear. The ratio of the twist is 1:15.8; at 6=Lands 6=Grooves. The gun used Inconel 625 (a nickel-chromium alloy) material and stainless steel via the Direct Metal Laser Sintering method.

The Solid Concepts Browning M1911 replica, version 2.0, will be composed of 34 Inconel 625 components, (not including grips). The two carbon-fiber filled nylon 12 grips were also 3D printed. Unlike early 3D printed plastic guns, the barrel of the 1911 was rifled. None of the parts were machined during production, and assembly took less than seven minutes once the parts had been filed and hardened.

=== Printer ===
The German EOSINT M270 Direct Metal 3D Printer used to create the weapon cost between $500,000 to $1,000,000 at the time the gun was created as of November 2013 and uses a commercial-grade power source. The printer requires argon and nitrogen gas.

=== Capability and firing tests ===
According to Sky News, during the initial test Solid Concepts stated: "It functions beautifully. Our resident gun expert has fired 50 successful rounds and hit a few bull's eyes at over 30 yards (27.43 metres)". The Solid Concepts Pistol fired its 5000th round on 6 September 2014.

== See also ==
- List of 3D printed weapons and parts
