= Hi-Point Model JHP =

Semi-automatic pistol

Hi-Point Model JHP .45 ACP
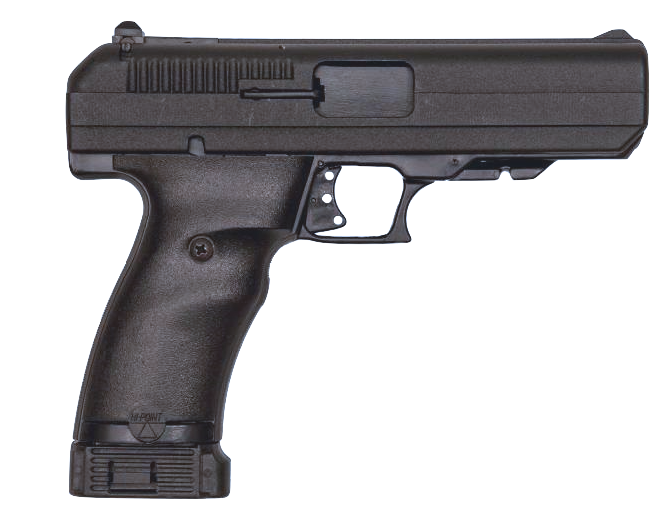
- Type: Pistol
- Place of origin: United States

Production history
- Designer: Tom Deeb
- Manufacturer: Hi-Point Firearms
- Produced: 1997-present

Specifications
- Mass: 32 oz (910 g)
- Length: 7.72 inches (196 mm)
- Barrel length: 4.5 inches (110 mm)
- Cartridge: .45 ACP
- Action: Blowback
- Feed system: 9-round detachable box magazine
- Sights: Blade front, adjustable notch rear

The Hi-Point Model JHP is a polymer-framed, semi-automatic, blowback-operated pistol manufactured by Hi-Point Firearms.

It is chambered in .45 ACP and is rated to accept +P ammunition.

== Design ==
The pistol has a proprietary integral accessory rail, and a thumb safety which doubles as a slide lock. The weapon uses the .45 ACP cartridge, and is the largest pistol that Hi-Point manufactures. All of Hi-Point's handguns use a blowback design similar to that used in the German Walther PPK and Russian Makarov PM. In blowback weapons the return spring and mass of the slide absorbs the rearward force generated by the propulsion of the bullet. As the slide moves back, an extractor hooks the empty casing by the rim and pulls it out of the chamber after which the case is ejected. After the slide has completed its rearward travel, the recoil spring moves the slide forward, also chambering another round. Many modern handguns use a locked-breech design and therefore do not require the amount of mass that the blowback design requires in order to remain safe to fire. Because all Hi-Point firearms are rated for +P ammunition the slides are even heftier than what would otherwise be necessary.

When the last round is fired and ejected, the slide will lock in the open position. There is no slide release on the Hi-Point .45 JHP, so releasing the slide is performed by pulling the locked slide further back.

Out of the box this pistol is mounted with a typical 3-dot sight and also includes a free ghost ring sight. Along with the sights the weapon comes with a trigger lock and other combinations are available as well such as a hard plastic storage case, a metal lock box, and a belt holster. It's available in plain black, pink camouflage, woodland camouflage, and digital desert camouflage. The gun's barrel has a 7 groove right hand twist, and the proprietary integrated accessory rail only fits a Hi-Point LaserLyte laser sight or ¾ inch laser ring.

Due to the fixed barrel, accuracy is well above average, on par with higher priced pistols this weapon remains popular due to its low cost and lifetime, no questions asked warranty, and extremely rugged nature. While Hi-Point Firearms gives free repairs for the entire life of the gun, most competitors in the firearms industry only offer lifetime warranties for the first owner.

Some aftermarket upgrades or modifications not sold by Hi-Point are available such as a milled aluminum rear sight, wood grips, a replacement magazine catch that converts the pistol to use 1911 magazines, a milled aluminum trigger, and a stainless steel guide rod. Also, the magazine spring is also approximately the same size as the Glock 43, for which there are stronger aftermarket springs available.

== Criticisms ==
Hi-Point handguns have been criticized for their weight and size, however, they do help to reduce recoil. The JHP has also been known to have issues with magazine feeds and feed jams. To remedy this some owners have reported good results bending the feed lips of the magazine and replacing the magazine spring.

Some consider the lack of a firing pin block safety mechanism in the striker fired design to be inherently less safe than other designs and, therefore not safe to carry in Condition One. However other firearms are similar in design such as the 1911.

Field stripping a Hi-Point requires the use of a punch to remove a pin, while most modern pistols can be disassembled for cleaning without the use of additional tools. There is an aftermarket screw available to replace the pin, but disassembly would still require the use of a 1/16 hex wrench.

== See also ==
- Hi-Point Firearms
- Hi-Point CF-380
- Hi-Point C-9
- Hi-Point Model JCP
- Hi-Point Model JXP
- Hi-Point carbine
