= Grizzly (.22-caliber rifle) =

G22 Grizzly
- Type: Break-action rifle
- Place of origin: Canada

Production history
- Designer: Various (Matthew, Mussy, zer0fux, Coop)
- Designed: 2013–2023
- Manufacturer: Community-developed (FOSSCAD, GCI, AWCY?)
- No. built: Multiple (primarily 3D-printed)

Specifications
- Mass: Varies by version
- Length: Varies by version
- length: Varies by version

The G22 Grizzly is a series of 3D-printed, single-shot, break-action rifles that fire .22LR cartridges. Initially developed in 2013 by a Canadian designer known by the pseudonym "Matthew", the G22 Grizzly has evolved through multiple iterations, with each version improving design, functionality, and printability. It is known for its high level of 3D-printability, requiring minimal non-printable metal parts. The latest version, G22v4, was released in September 2023.

== Development and Versions ==
=== G22v1 (Grizzly 1.0) ===
The first version, commonly known as the Grizzly 1.0, was developed in Canada by "Matthew" in August 2013 using a Stratasys Dimension 1200es printer, which cost approximately $10,000 at the time. It was inspired by the Liberator (gun), a 3D-printed handgun developed by Cody Wilson and Defense Distributed. Constructed from ABS plastic, the Grizzly 1.0 could fire a single shot before breaking due to strain.

According to "Matthew", the rifle took three days to build and around 27 hours to print, with the receiver taking 13 hours, the barrel 6.5 hours, the stock 5 hours, and internal parts 2 hours. The only metal component in the design was a 1-inch roofing nail used as a firing pin.

=== G22v2 (Grizzly 2.0) ===
Released shortly after the first version, Grizzly 2.0 featured a 50% larger barrel with rifling, a larger receiver, and a new hammer for improved durability. It was capable of firing up to 14 rounds before sustaining damage from the strain. The Grizzly 2.0 maintained the .22LR caliber, used ABS plastic for its construction, and required minimal metal components—similar to the first version.

=== G22v3 (Grizzly v3) ===
The G22 Grizzly v3, released in early 2023 by designers "Mussy" and "zer0fux", offered a more modular design with enhanced customization. It retained the break-action mechanism and primarily 3D-printed construction. It was compatible with the AWCY Protobarrel, and the release included detailed assembly documentation. The only non-printable parts required were a metal firing pin, breech plate, and spring.

=== G22v4 (Grizzly v4) ===
The latest version, G22v4, was developed by "Coop" under the organization GCI and released on September 21, 2023. It incorporates the AWCY? 10/22 Proto-Barrel and focuses on improved printability, durability, and ease of assembly. It remains a .22LR, single-shot, break-action rifle, designed for maximum printability with minimal metal parts.

== Printer ==
The printer used for the initial development of the Grizzly series was the Stratasys Dimension 1200es, which was used to create the original Grizzly 1.0 and 2.0 versions. It utilized ABS plastic as the primary material.

== See also ==
- Liberator (gun)
- Defense Distributed
- List of notable 3D printed weapons and parts
