= Hi-Point Firearms =

American firearms manufacturer

- Type: Private
- Industry: Firearms
- Founded: January 2, 1990; 36 years ago Mansfield, Ohio, U.S.
- Founder: Tom Deeb
- Headquarters: Mansfield, Ohio, U.S.
- Key people: President: Joe Strassell
- Products: Pistols, carbines
- Owner: Employee Owned
- Number of employees: 50+
- Parent: Strassell's Machine, Inc.
- Website: www.hi-pointfirearms.com

Hi-Point Firearms, also known as Strassell's Machine, Inc (distributed by MKS Supply), is an American firearms manufacturer based in Mansfield, Ohio. All of their firearms are manufactured in several locations in Ohio.

== Construction of products ==
=== Pistols ===
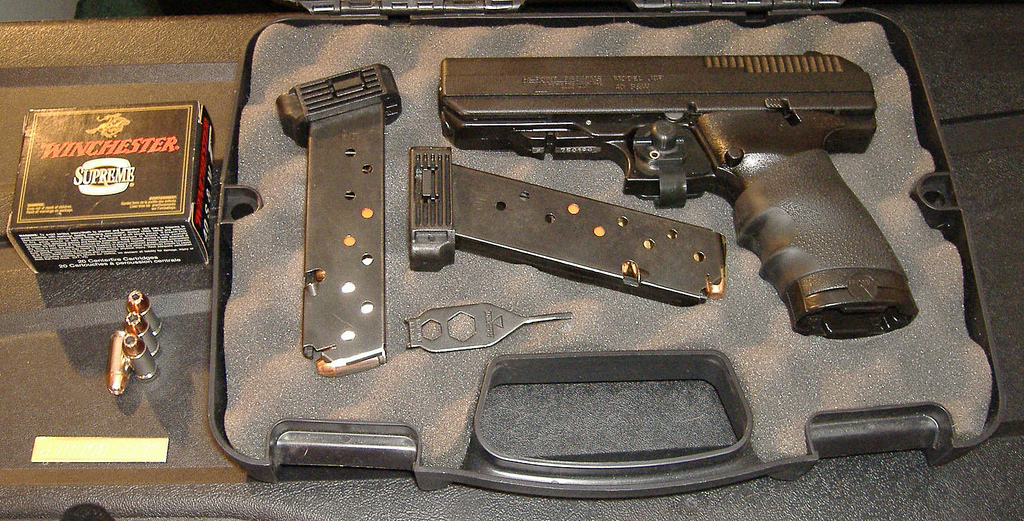
A Hi-Point JCP pistol

Hi-Point semi-automatic pistols are polymer framed handguns based on the blowback design. Different from other blowback design pistols such as the Walther PPK, the P-64, and the Astra 600 which use a heavy slide combined with a stiff recoil spring to hold the breech closed, these pistols use a heavier slide so they can use a softer recoil spring. When compared to breech-locking handguns of the same caliber and dimensions, the Hi-Point is rather top heavy. As with most blowback handguns, this pistol has fewer moving parts to clean and lubricate than its locked breech counterparts.

While most semi-automatic pistols can be field stripped without the use of any tools, Hi-Point pistols require a small punch or a screwdriver and a hammer to remove a pin in the receiver, in order to permit slide removal (and thus enable field-stripping).

Rather than being machined from forged steel, the slide is die cast from Zamak-3. Zamak is a zinc alloy which is often used in low cost firearms; previous manufacturers using this technique included Lorcin Engineering Company and Raven Arms. Die casting is particularly commonplace in Ohio, which influenced the decision to implement it.

Uncommon for this construction, Hi-Point pistols are rated for +P ammunition in calibers up to .45 ACP. Blowback designs are generally simpler in design and easier and cheaper to manufacture than locked-breech recoil-operated firearms. While the fixed barrel of a blowback gun generally will contribute to improved accuracy, blowback guns usually need to be larger and heavier than a locked-breech gun firing the same caliber.

=== Carbines ===
The Hi-Point carbine is a series of pistol-caliber carbines manufactured by Hi-Point Firearms chambered for 9×19mm Parabellum, .40 S&W, 10mm Auto, .45 ACP and .380 ACP. They are very inexpensive, constructed using polymers and alloyed metals as much as possible, resulting in a reduction of production costs and sale price. It functions via a simple direct blowback action. Hi-Point carbines use a polymer stock, stamped sheet metal receiver cover, and a receiver and bolt cast from Zamak-3. The barrel is steel and button rifled using a 1-10" right hand twist.

== Calibers ==
Hi-Point manufactures firearms in the following calibers:

- .380 ACP – Model CF-380 and 380COMP, and the YC380
- 9×19mm Parabellum – C9 and C9 COMP pistols and YC9
- .40 S&W – Model JCP pistol
- .45 ACP – Model JHP pistol
- 10mm Auto – Model JXP pistol
- Hi-Point carbines chambered in .30 Super Carry, .380 ACP, 9mm Luger, .40 S&W, 10mm Auto, and .45 ACP
- Hi-Point HP-15 rifle chambered in 5.56/.223
- Hi-Point HP-15P pistol chambered in 5.56/.223 and .300 Blackout

== Safety ==
Hi-Point firearms have a manual thumb safety and an integral drop safety that prevents firing in the event that the firearm is dropped. Until the 2000s, all Hi-Point products except the 995 (9mm) carbine had a last-round lock open and magazine disconnect safety, preventing firing unless a magazine was in the gun. With the replacement of the original 9mm carbine with the new 995 TS model, all pistols and carbines now have these features.

== Gallery ==
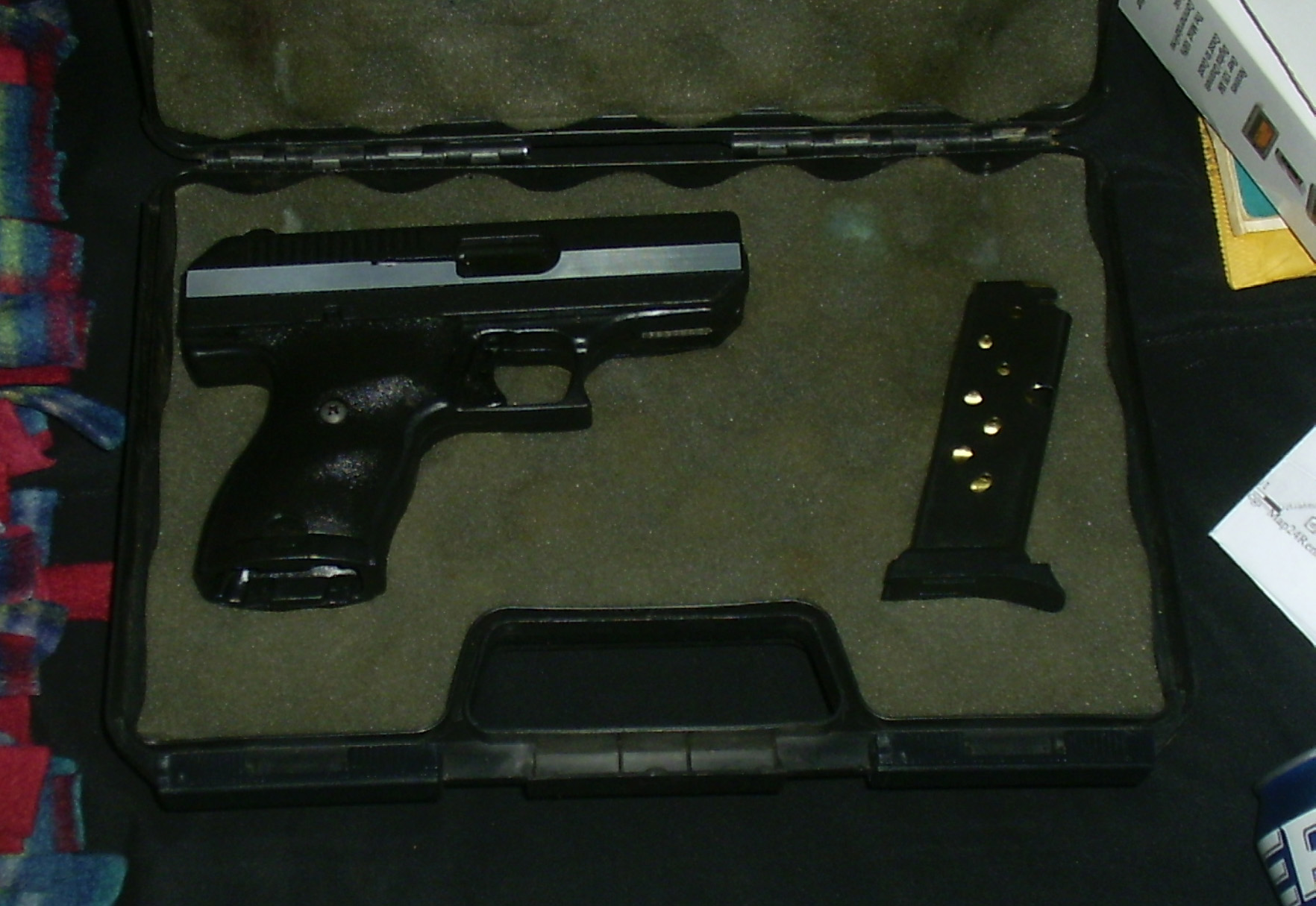
Hi-Point CF380 pistol with two-tone finish; the C-9 is identical except it is simply black, and chambered for 9×19mm Parabellum

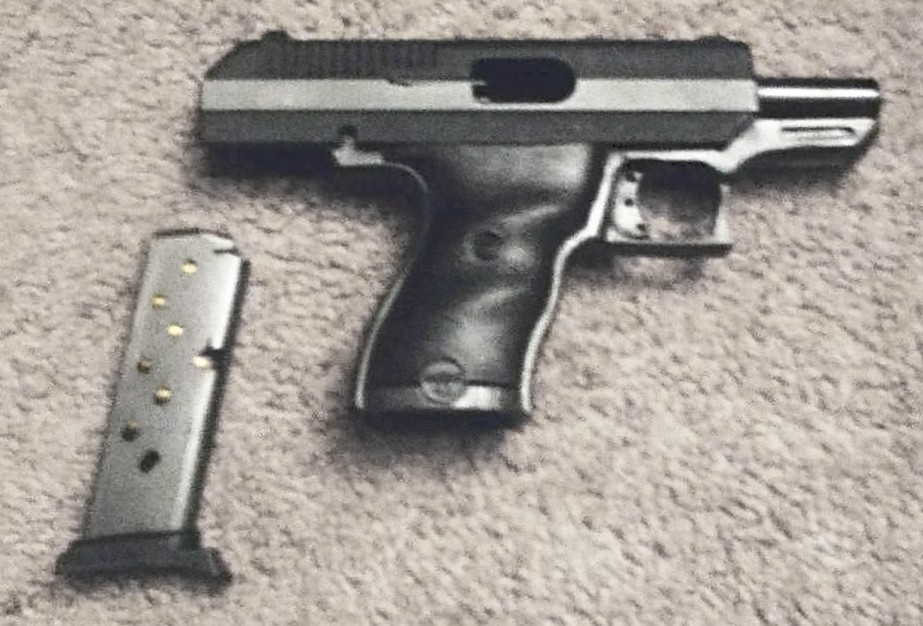
Hi-Point C380 pistol with the slide locked back

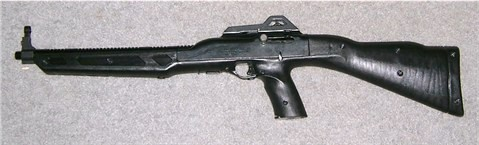
"Generation 1" 995 Hi-Point carbine

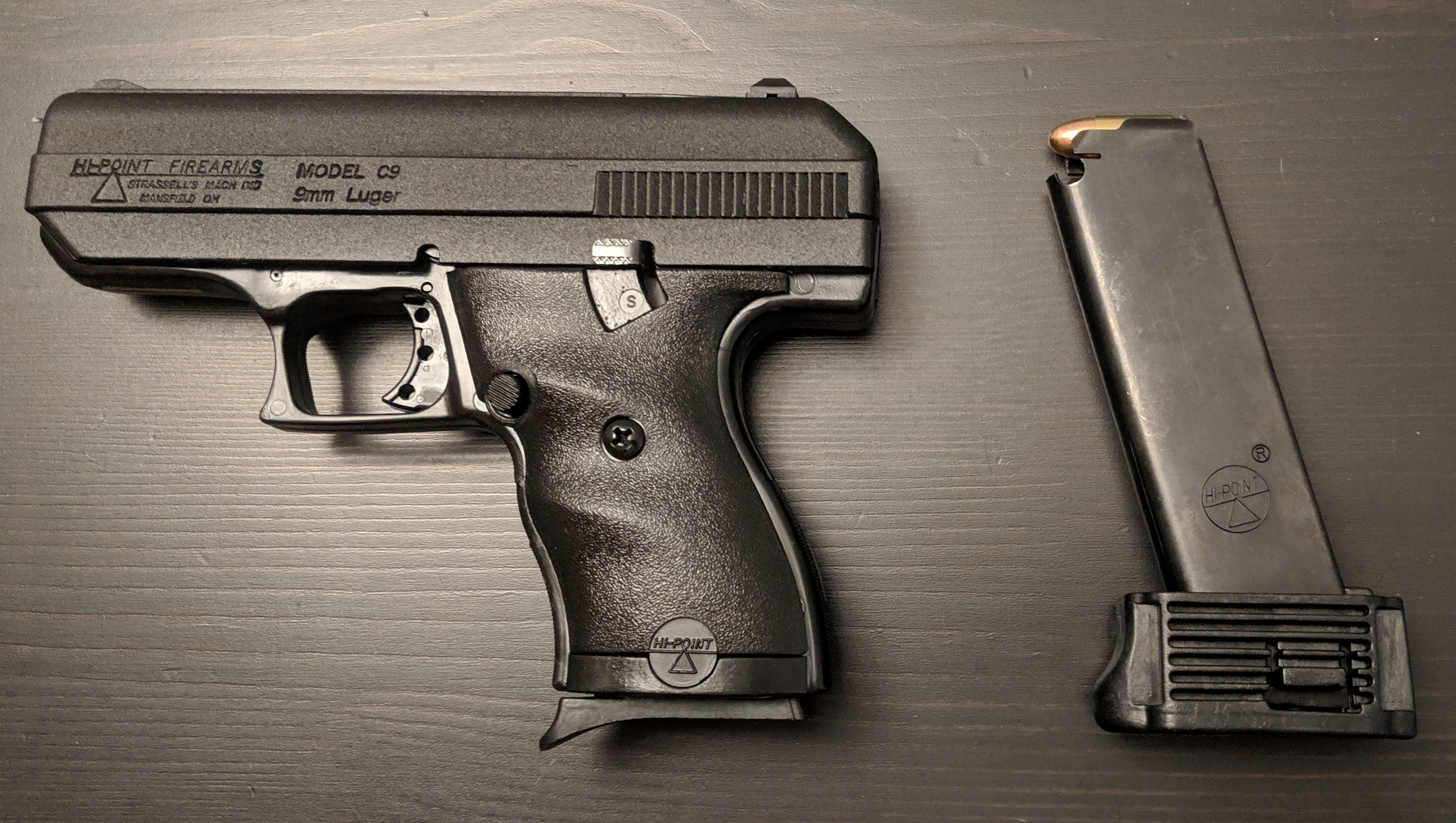
Hi-Point C9
