= Hi-Point Model JCP =

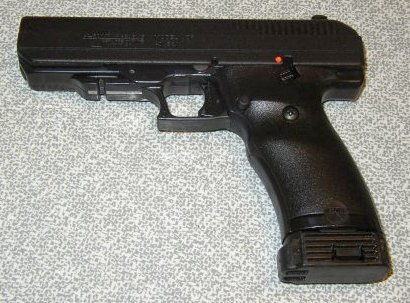
Hi-Point Model JCP .40S&W
- Type: Semi-automatic pistol
- Place of origin: United States

Production history
- Designer: Tom Deeb
- Manufacturer: Hi-Point Firearms
- Produced: 1997-present

Specifications
- Mass: 32 oz (910 g)
- Length: 7.72 in (196 mm)
- Barrel length: 4.5 in (110 mm)
- Caliber: .40 S&W
- Action: Blowback
- Muzzle velocity: ~ 984 ft/s (300 m/s)
- Feed system: 10-round detachable box magazine
- Sights: blade front, notch rear (adjustable), optional ghost ring

The Hi-Point Model JCP is a blowback operated semi-automatic pistol chambered for the .40 S&W round.

== Design ==
The model JCP has a polymer frame like all Hi-Point pistols, a 4.5 inch barrel, and a slide composed of ZAMAK-3 with steel reinforcements.

It features an integral accessory rail for mounting lasers and flashlights on Hi-Point rings. The safety is a combination lever for locking the slide and blocking the sear movement. The immediate drawback of this system is that the weapon cannot be cocked while the safety is on; the safety locks the trigger/sear.

Hi-point's handguns use a blowback design similar to that used in the Walther PPK and Russian Makarov PM. In blowback firearms, the return spring and mass of the slide absorb the rearward force generated by the propulsion of the bullet. As the slide moves back, an extractor hooks the empty casing and pulls it out of the chamber after which the case is ejected from the firearm. When the slide has completed its rearward travel, the recoil spring moves the slide forward, chambering another round. Many modern handguns use a locked-breech design and therefore do not require the amount of mass that the blowback design requires in order to remain safe to fire, comfortable to shoot, and easy to control during the firing process.

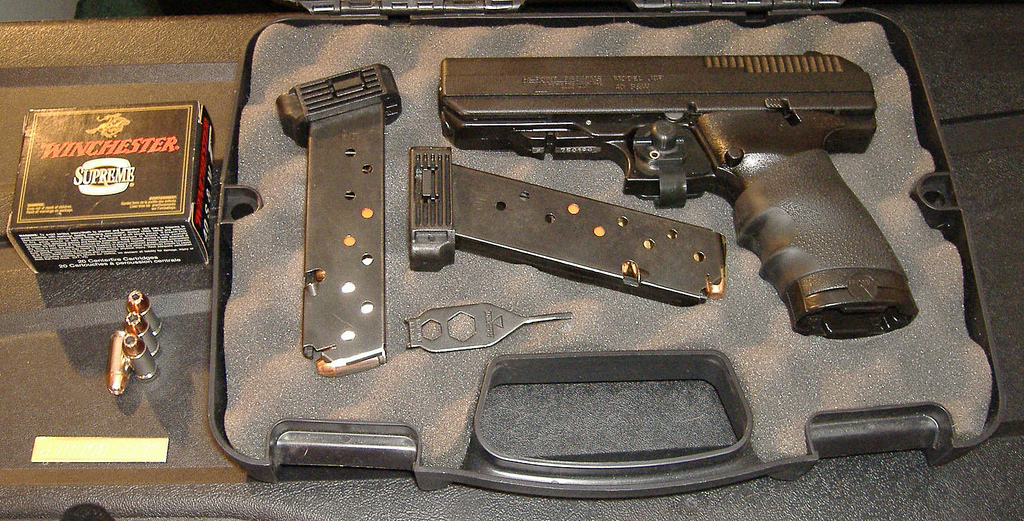
Hi-Point Model JCP

The weapon's larger slide helps to make blowback operation possible.

The firing pin in this design also acts as the ejector.

== Features ==
- +P rating to handle all factory ammunition
- Polymer frame with an integral accessory rail
- Black powder coat finish
- Three-dot sights, fully adjustable rear sight (windage and elevation adjustable); optional ghost ring sight
- Quick on and off thumb safety
- Magazine disconnect safety
- Last round hold open

== See also ==
- Hi-Point CF-380
- Hi-Point C-9 and C-9 Comp
- Hi-Point .45 ACP
- Hi-Point carbine
- Hi-Point Model JHP
- Hi-Point Model JXP
