= Objet Geometries =

3D printer company acquired by Stratasys

- Company type: Private
- Industry: Rapid prototyping
- Genre: 3D printing
- Founded: 1998; 28 years ago
- Headquarters: Rehovot, Israel
- Revenue: $120 million (2011)
- Number of employees: 345 (2011)
- Website: http://www.objet.com/

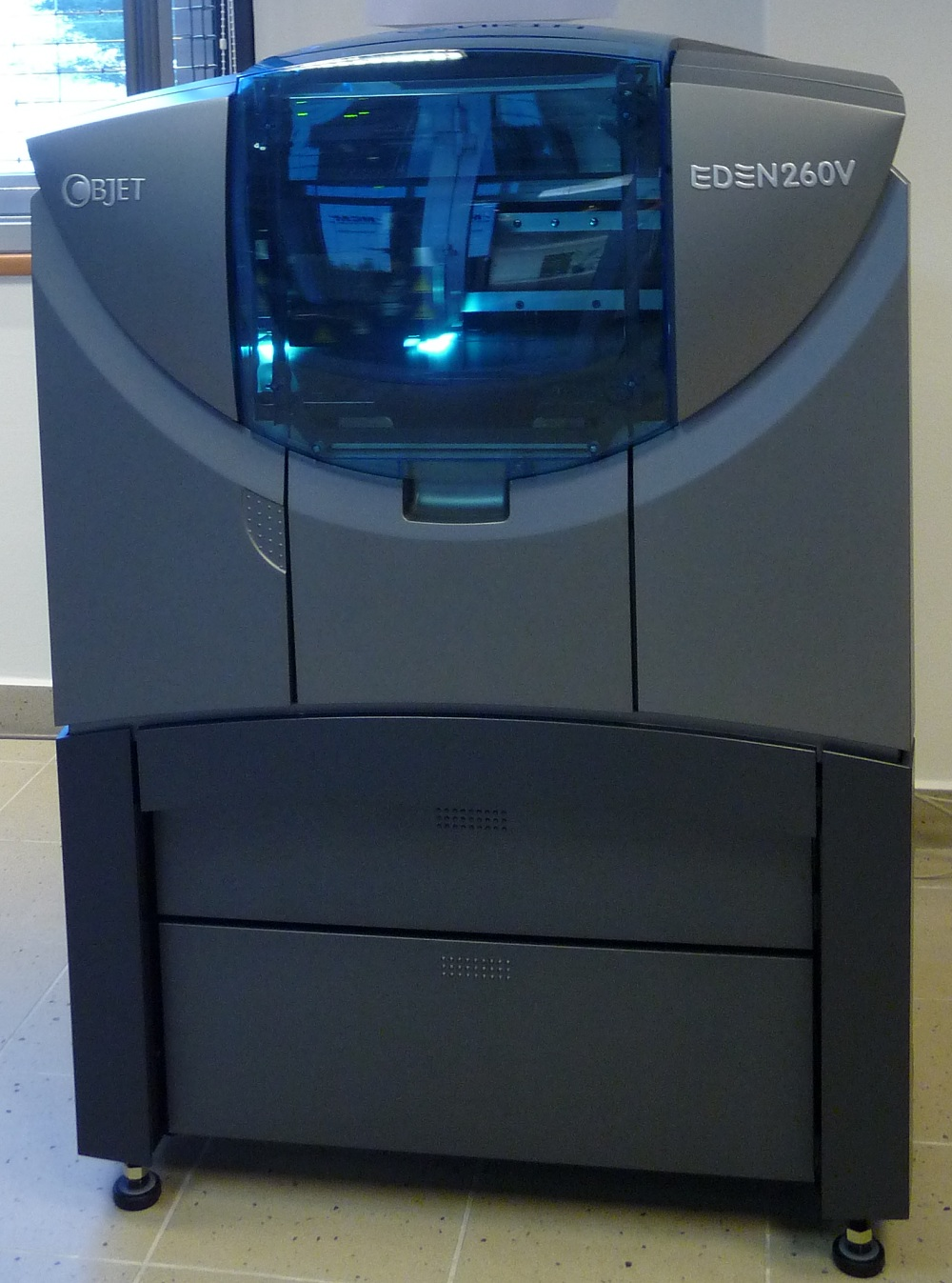
Objet Eden 260V polyjet 3D printer

Objet Geometries is one of the brands of Stratasys, a 3D printer developing company. The brand began with Objet Geometries Ltd, a corporation engaged in the design, development, and manufacture of photopolymer 3D printing systems. The company, incorporated in 1998, was based in Rehovot, Israel. In 2011 the company merged with Stratasys. It held patents on a number of associated printing materials that are used in PolyJet and PolyJet Matrix polymer jetting technologies. It distributed 3D printers worldwide through wholly owned subsidiaries in the United States (Objet Geometries Inc), Europe (Objet Geometries GmbH), and Hong Kong. Objet Geometries owned more than 50 patents and patent-pending inventions.

== History ==
Objet was founded in 1998 by Rami Bonen, Gershon Miller and Hanan Gothait. In September 2000 it announced the completion of a second private placement, securing it $15 million at a post-money company valuation of $36 million. Participants in this round were the Templeton Foreign Fund, private investors from Europe and the United States and Scitex Corporation, which acquired an initial 18.7% stake in the company, which was subsequently increased. In June 2005, Scitex sold all its interest, then standing at 22.9%, to the other shareholders of Objet for $3.0 million in cash.

=== Merger with Stratasys ===
On April 16, 2012, Objet announced that it agreed to merge with Stratasys, a leading manufacturer of 3D printers; in an all-stock transaction. Stratasys shareholders were expected to own 55 percent and Objet shareholders were expected to own 45 percent of the combined company. The merger was completed on December 3, 2012. The market capitalization of the new company was approximately $3.0 billion.

== Technology ==
The Polyjet Matrix 3D printing technology uses simultaneous jetting of multiple types of modeling materials to create a single piece 3D model. PolyJet is used by automotive, electronics, consumer goods, medical development, and clothing manufacturers, as well as for creating 3D models for use in movies such as Coraline.

The Eden line of 3D Printing Systems and the Alaris30 3D desktop printer are based on the PolyJet technology. The Connex family of 3D printers are based on PolyJet Matrix technology, which jets multiple model materials simultaneously and creates composite Digital Materials on the fly. All Objet systems use FullCure polymers.

== Partnerships ==
Objet Geometries has partnered with SolidWorks to interface their computer-aided design software with Objet’s Connex500 system. The co-developed software add-in allows significantly more control over end to end modelling preferences.

== See also ==
- 3D printing
- Rapid prototyping
- Stereolithography
