= Charon (gun) =

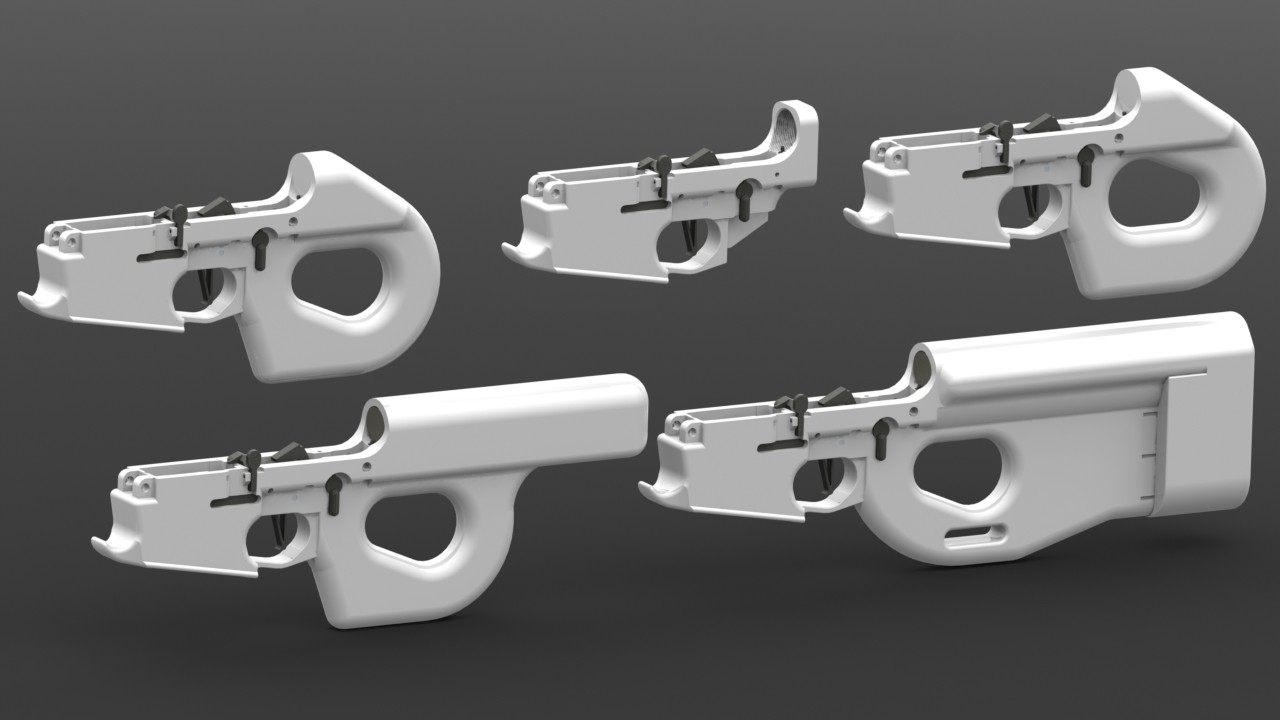
An image of the DEFCAD Charon AR-15 family.

The DEFCAD Charon is an open source 3D-printable AR-15 lower receiver project that was partially inspired by the Fabrique Nationale P90. It began as a design exercise by a DEFCAD user to explore FDM additive manufacturing technology as a means of integrating the P90's ergonomics into a stock for the AR-15, resulting in the WarFairy P-15 stock set.

The additive manufacturing process permits curvilinear designs that are too expensive or impossible to do by subtractive methods. From the P-15, it was integrated with the DefDist V5 lower receiver, resulting in the WarFairy Charon V0.1. Further advantage was taken of the nature of FDM polymer printing to make it possible for printers with small work envelopes to produce large items, i.e., the Charon was designed to be printed in sections and then assembled with solvent cement.

The Charon pistol version was successfully test fired in July 2013 with no sign of damage.
