= Hi-Point C-9 =

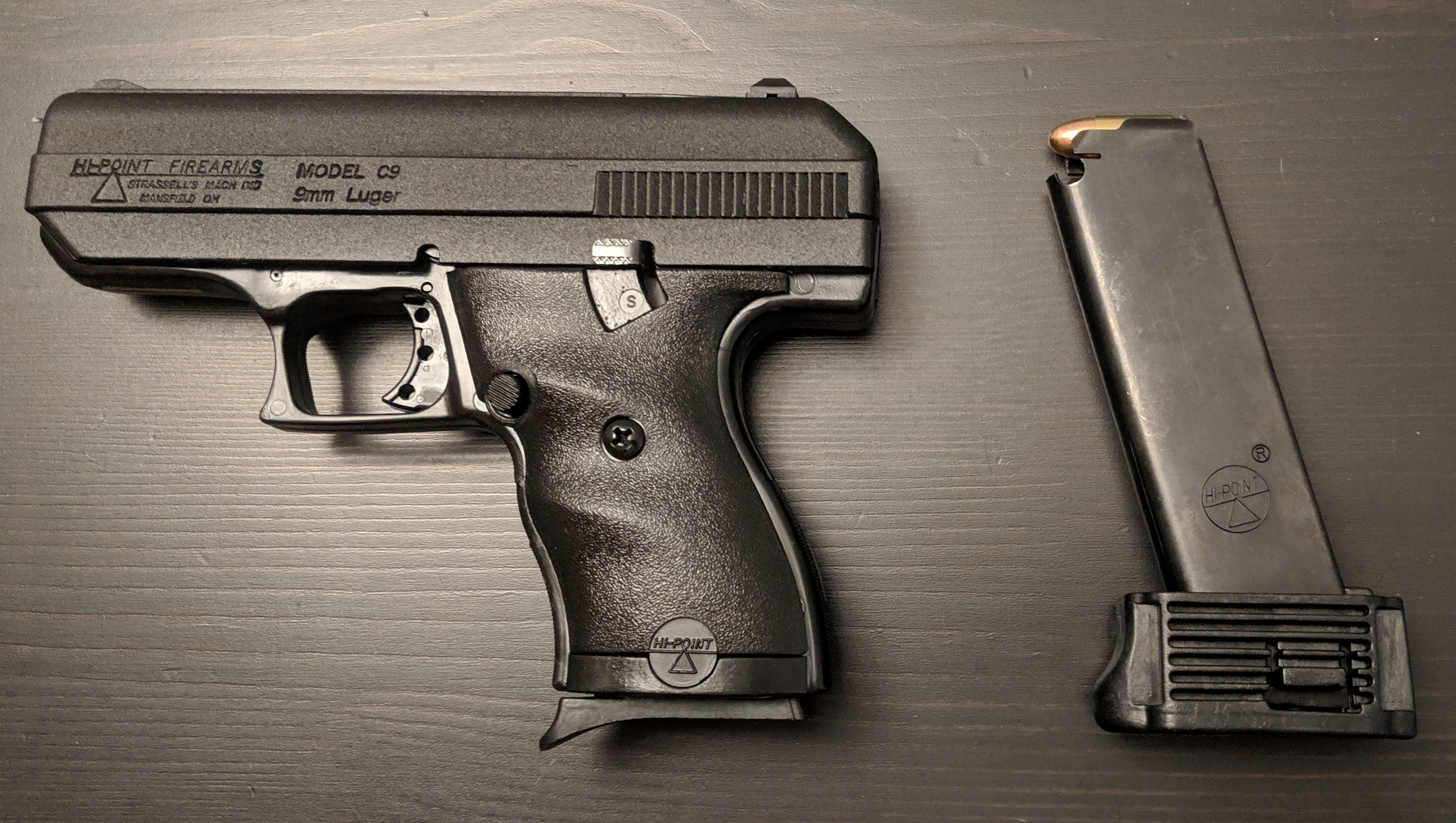
- Hi-Point C-9 with a ten round magazine on right.
- Type: Semi-automatic pistol
- Place of origin: United States

Production history
- Designer: Tom Deeb
- Manufacturer: Hi-Point Firearms

Specifications
- Mass: unloaded 25 oz (709 g); 29 oz (822 g) loaded per spec
- Length: 6.75 in (171 mm)
- Barrel length: 3.5 in (89 mm)
- Cartridge: 9×19mm Parabellum
- Action: Blowback
- Muzzle velocity: 1,279.5 ft/s (390 m/s)
- Feed system: 8-, 10-, or 15-round detachable box magazine
- Sights: blade front, notch rear (adjustable)

The Hi-Point Model C-9 is a polymer-framed, semi-automatic, blowback-operated pistol manufactured by Hi-Point Firearms. It is chambered in 9×19mm Parabellum and is rated to accept +P ammunition. It became well known for its low retail price of under $200. An improved model, the YC9, was originally expected for release by late 2019, but was finally released for sale in August 2023.

== Model C-9 ==
The Model C-9 is a compact, single-stack magazine, model of Hi-Point's 9×19mm handgun. It consists of a polymer frame, zinc-alloy slide and bolt (with steel reinforcing inserts), and a steel breech, chamber and barrel. Its low price and small and compact design prompted many to purchase it for concealed carry.

Hi-Point's handguns use a simple blowback design with no locking parts. In blowback weapons the mass of the slide and bolt absorbs the rearward force generated by the propulsion of the bullet. As the pressure drops to a safe level, the slide moves back (along with the bolt), an extractor hooks the empty casing and pulls it out of the chamber, after which the case is ejected from the weapon by the ejector. When the slide has completed its rearward travel, the recoil spring moves the slide forward, chambering another round.

== Model C-9 Comp. ==
The C-9 Comp. (short for "Compensated") is the larger version of Hi-Point's 9 mm handgun. Its major difference from the C-9 Compact is that it has a specially designed "compensator" attached to the end of the barrel. The compensator works as a muzzle brake, by forcing some of the hot gases escaping behind the bullet to go upward through specially drilled holes in the top of the compensator. The escaping gases push the end of the gun downward; helping to eliminate some of the upward motion caused by the natural recoil of the gun. The underside of the C-9 Comp. has been machined with rails to accept the addition of accessories such as a flashlight or laser sights for better target identification.

Another difference between the C-9 and C-9 Comp. is the barrel length. Its 4 in (102 mm) barrel is 1/2 in (12.7 mm) longer than its sister weapon's providing for better accuracy and balance. The compensator and extra bulk also increase the weight. Weighing in at 35 oz (992 g), it is 6 oz (170 g) heavier than the new model, and 2 oz (57 g) heavier than the older model of the C-9 Compact.

== YC9 ==
The YC9, an improved version of the C-9, was developed in 2019. The pistol's name was decided after an online contest, in which Yeet Cannon received 313,000 votes, over 96% of the total. The weapon's length, weight, and caliber are identical to the C-9, but it features a new safety, new grip texturing, "Glock-style" front sights, and an elongated sight base, allowing for a Picatinny rail. Limited numbers of C-9s with YEET Cannon G1 marked on the slide became available starting on July 17, 2019. YC9s were planned to become available for sale in 2020, and became available summer of 2023

== Criticisms ==
The C-9, C-9 Compensated, and other Hi-Point handguns have been criticized for their weight. In response to this complaint, the empty or unloaded weight of the C-9 has been trimmed from 29 ounces (822 g) to 25 ounces (709 g) by using a polymer frame, making its weight comparable to other pistols with similar magazine capacities.

Like other Hi-Point pistols, field stripping the C-9 requires the use of a small punch or a small screwdriver and a hammer to remove a spring pin in the receiver. The weapon's overall reliability has been questioned because of different kinds of jamming: misfeed and failure to return to battery among others.

== See also ==
- Hi-Point Firearms
- Hi-Point CF-380
- Hi-Point Model 40SW
- Hi-Point .45 ACP
- Hi-Point carbine
