= Hi-Point CF-380 =

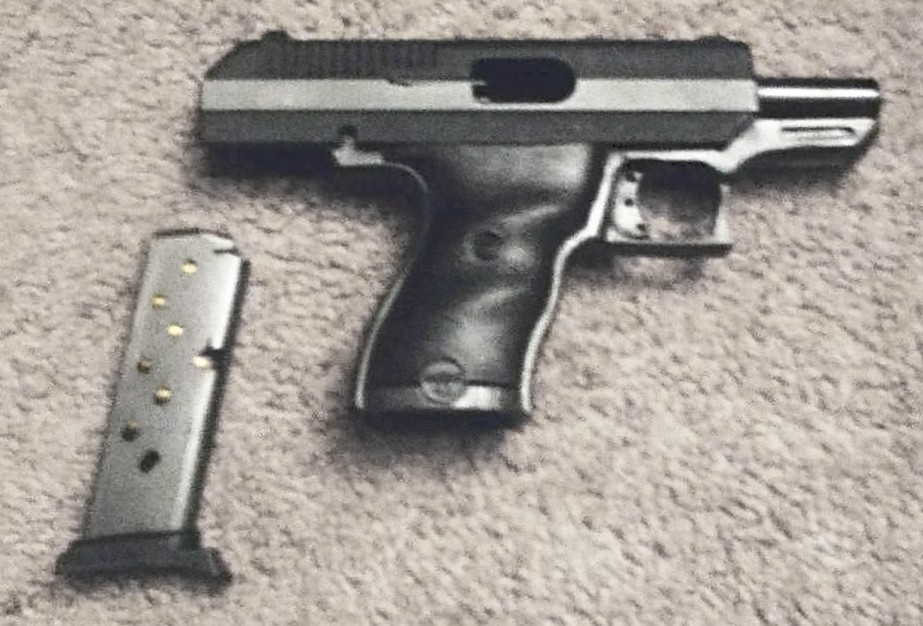
- Two-tone Hi-Point CF-380 in .380 ACP
- Type: Semi-automatic pistol
- Place of origin: United States

Production history
- Designer: Tom Deeb
- Manufacturer: Hi-Point Firearms

Specifications
- Mass: unloaded 25oz (709 g); 29oz (822 g) loaded per spec
- Length: 6.75 in (171 mm)
- Barrel length: 3.5 in (89 mm)
- Cartridge: .380 ACP
- Action: Blowback
- Muzzle velocity: 1,279.5 ft/s (390 m/s)
- Feed system: 8-round or 10-round detachable box magazine
- Sights: blade front, notch rear (adjustable)

The Hi-Point Model CF-380 is a polymer-framed, semi-automatic, blowback-operated pistol manufactured by Hi-Point Firearms. It is chambered in .380 ACP. With a 3.5 inch barrel weighing 29 ounces.

== Design ==
The Model CF-380 is a compact, single stack magazine, derivative of Hi-Point's 9×19mm handgun line. It consists of a polymer frame, zinc-alloy slide and bolt (with steel reinforcing inserts, and a steel breech, chamber and barrel. Its low price and small and compact design prompted many to purchase it for concealed carry.

Hi-point's handguns use a blowback design similar to that used in the Walther PPK and Russian Makarov PM. In blowback firearms the mass of the slide and bolt absorbs the rearward force generated by the propulsion of the bullet. As the pressure drops to a safe level, the slide moves back (along with the bolt), an extractor hooks the empty casing and pulls it out of the chamber, after which the case is ejected from the firearm by the ejector. When the slide has completed its rearward travel, the recoil spring moves the slide forward, chambering another round. Many, if not most, modern handguns use a locked-breech design and therefore do not require the amount of slide mass that the blowback design requires in order to remain comfortable to shoot, safe to fire, and easy to control during the firing process.

== Criticisms ==
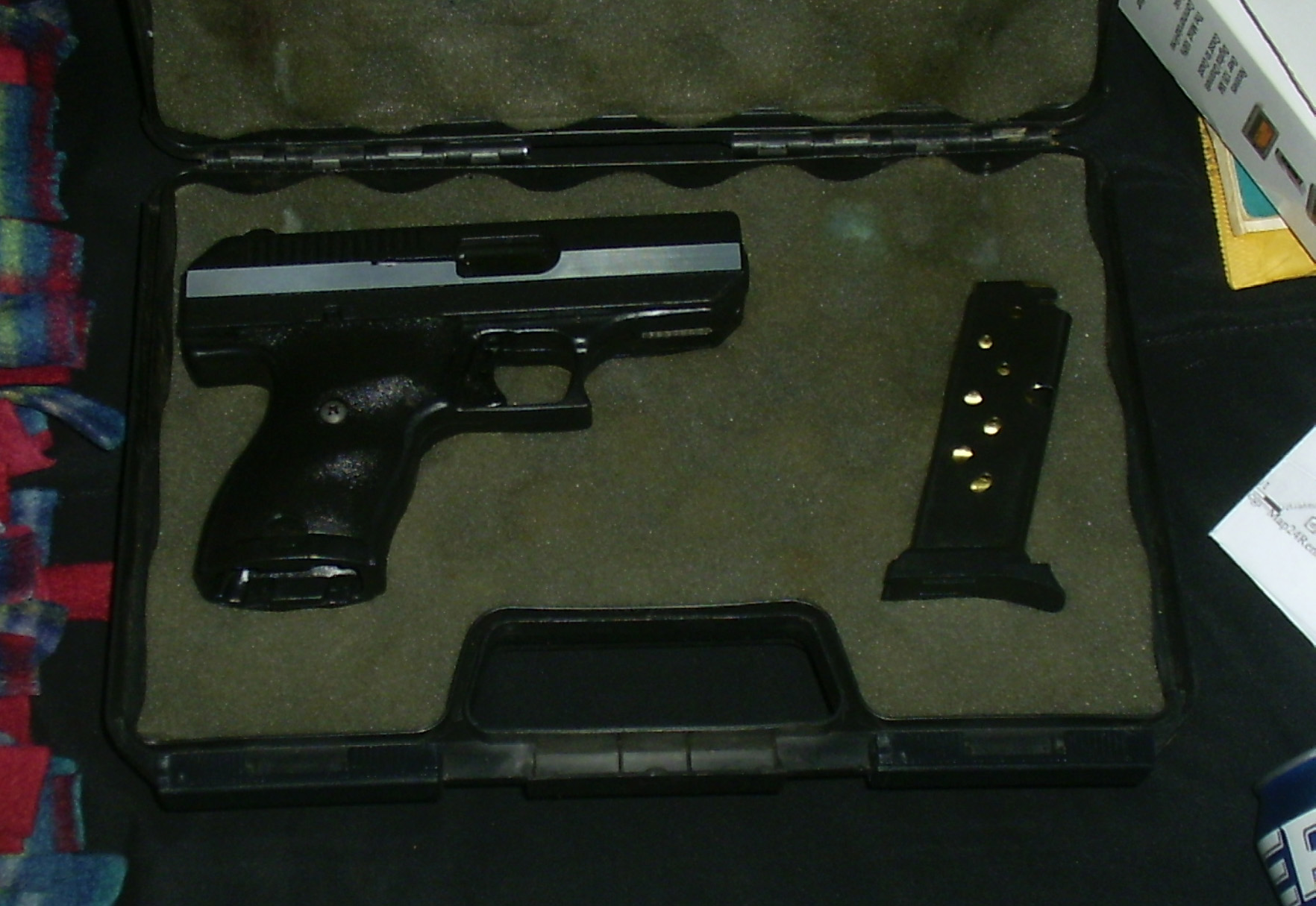
Hi-Point CF-380 in two-tone finish.

The firing pin in this design also acts as the ejector. It is possible to have a 'out of battery detonation' while hand cycling live ammo through the gun due to this. This means that it is not safe to hand cycle live ammo through the gun and great care should be taken while unloading.

== See also ==
- Hi-Point Firearms
- Hi-Point C-9 and C-9 Comp
- Hi-Point Model 40SW
- Hi-Point .45 ACP
- Hi-Point carbine
