= AIO =

AIO, Aio or AiO may refer to:

== Arts, entertainment, and media ==
- Adventures in Odyssey, an Evangelical Christian-themed radio drama/comedy series
- Äio, a 2010 folk-metal album from Estonian folk-metal group Metsatöll
- Aio, a character in the 2005 drama fantasy action TV series Darna (2005 TV series)
- Mio Aio, Takumi Aio, and/or Yūji Aio, characters from the Japanese novel and film Be with You
- Aio, the fictional world of the video game Rise of Nations: Rise of Legends

== Businesses and organizations ==
- Aio Wireless, former subsidiary unit of AT&T Inc. that provided prepaid wireless service
- Anthropological Index Online, international indexing service for anthropology

== Computing ==
- AIO Robotics, an American 3D Printer company
- Asynchronous I/O
- All-in-one (closed-loop), a liquid cooling system for a computer processor
- All-in-one computer
- Artificial intelligence optimization (AIO)

== People ==
- Aio (monk), a fabricated monk of Crowland Abbey in Lincolnshire, England
- Aio of Friuli (9th century), probable Duke of Friuli, northeast Italy
- AiO (Ai Ōtsuka), a J-pop singer
- Aiō, an alternate spelling for Ay-O, the Japanese rainbow painter from Fluxus

== Other uses ==
- Aio, Yamaguchi, a town in Yamaguchi Prefecture, Japan
- AIO variables (Activity, Interest, Opinion), a type of psychographics measure
- Atlantic Municipal Airport (IATA/FAA code AIO)

== See also ==
- All in One (disambiguation), with various specific meanings
