= List of 3D printer manufacturers =

This is a list of notable manufacturers of 3D printers. 3D printers are a type of robots that are able to print 3D models using successive layers of raw materials.

== 0–9 ==
- 3D makeR Technologies – Barranquilla, Colombia
- 3D Systems – Rock Hill, South Carolina, USA

== A-B ==
- AIO Robotics – Los Angeles, California, USA
- Airwolf 3D – Costa Mesa, California, USA
- Aleph Objects – Loveland, Colorado, USA – (Lulzbot printers), (owned by FAME 3D)
- Bambu Lab – Shenzhen, China

== C-F ==
- Carbon – Redwood City, California, USA
- Cellink – Boston, Massachusetts, USA
- CRP Group – Modena, Italy
- Creality – Shenzhen, China
- Desktop Metal – Burlington, Massachusetts, USA
- envisionTEC (ETEC) – Gladbeck, Germany, (owned by Desktop Metal)
- Formlabs – Somerville, Massachusetts, USA
- Fusion3 – Greensboro, North Carolina, USA

== G-L ==
- HP Inc. – Palo Alto, California, USA
- Hyrel 3D – Norcross, Georgia, USA
- Kikai Labs – Buenos Aires, Argentina
- Kudo3d – Dublin, California, USA

== M ==
- M3D – Fulton, Maryland, USA
- Made In Space, Inc. – Mountain View, California, USA
- MakerBot – New York City, New York, USA
- Materialise NV – Leuven, Belgium
- Markforged – Massachusetts, USA
- Mcor Technologies Ltd – Dunleer, Ireland

== N-Q ==
- Printrbot – Lincoln, California, USA
- Prusa Research – Prague, Czech Republic

== R ==
- Renishaw plc - Wotton-under-Edge, Gloucestershire, UK
- Robo3D – San Diego, California, USA

== S-T ==
- Sciaky, Inc. – Chicago, Illinois, USA
- Sindoh – Seoul, South Korea
- SLM Solutions Group AG – Lübeck, Germany
- Solidscape – Wilton, New Hampshire, USA
- Stanley Black & Decker – New Britain, Connecticut, USA (Manufactured by Sindoh – South Korea)
- Stratasys – Minneapolis, Minnesota, USA and Rehovot, Israel

== U-Z ==
- Ultimaker – Geldermalsen, Netherlands
- Velleman – Gavere, Belgium
- Voxeljet – Friedberg, Germany
- Zortrax – Olsztyn, Poland
- ZYYX – Gothenburg, Sweden

== See also ==
- 3D printing processes
- List of 3D printing software
