= All in One =

All in One or All-in-One may refer to:

== Computing ==
- All-in-one computer, a desktop computer with the monitor and computer in the same case
- All-in-one printer or multifunction printer
- ALL-IN-1, an office automation software package from Digital Equipment Corporation
- Power Macintosh G3 All-in-One

== Other uses ==
- All in One (film), a 1938 short film
- All in One (Bebel Gilberto album)
- All in One (Karen Clark Sheard album)
- All in One (Whigfield album)
- "All in One (5 Mics)", a song by Reks from Grey Hairs
- "All in One", a 2021 song by Mirror
- Jumpsuit, a one-piece garment with sleeves and legs, referred to in British English as an all-in-one
- Laid-Back Camp: All-in-One!!, a 2023 Japanese mobile game developed by Enish for the anime series Laid-Back Camp
- Superzoom, a photographic lens with a large zoom ratio, sometimes referred to as an all-in-one lens

== See also ==
- AIO (disambiguation)
- One-piece (disambiguation)
