= Solidoodle =

American 3D printer company, 2011–2016

- Industry: 3D printing
- Founded: 2010
- Founder: Sam Cervantes
- Headquarters: Brooklyn, New York, United States
- Website: www.solidoodle.com

Solidoodle was a 3D printer company headquartered in Brooklyn, New York. Solidoodle was founded in September 2011 by engineer Sam Cervantes. Solidoodle 3D printers use digital files supplied by the user to create physical plastic parts.

Solidoodle suspended operations on March 28, 2016.

== Products ==
In contrast to the traditional RepRap model, which favors do it your self construction, Solidoodles have always been pre-assembled. The general distinguishing factors for the machines have included sturdy metal construction, factory assembly, and low price. All four of the existing Solidoodles have a protective steel shell, are assembled, and are priced under $1000.

Like most consumer FFF 3D printers, the Solidoodle is compatible with both acrylonitrile butadiene styrene (ABS), and polylactic acid (PLA).

=== Solidoodle 1 ===
The Solidoodle 1 was launched at Maker Faire 2011. The machine was 4 × 4 × 4 inch, and featured a steel enclosure. Unlike contemporary Solidoodles, the Solidoodle 1 features a geared drive mechanism.

The Solidoodle 1 was discontinued from the Solidoodle online store as of the release of the Solidoodle 2 in 2012. Because of an early program to provide inexpensive upgrades from the Solidoodle 1 to the Solidoodle 2 for early adopters, few Solidoodle 1's remain in the field, and the printer has become a bit of a rarity in 3D printing collections.

=== Solidoodle 2 ===
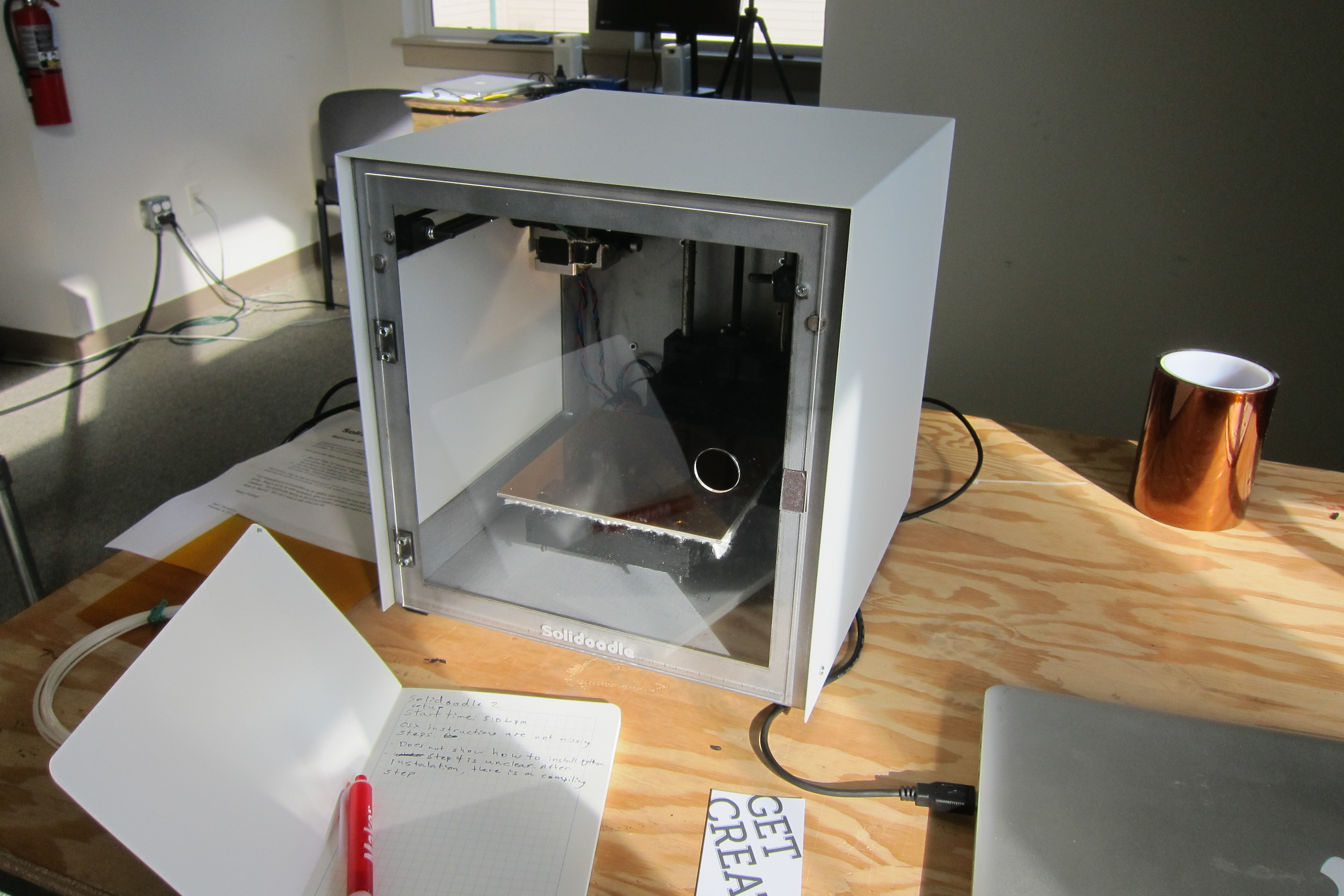
Solidoodle 2

The Solidoodle 2 was launched at New York Tech day, winning first prize. The printer was an incremental improvement over the Solidoodle 1, with a larger build area (6x6x6 inch), and a variety of optional upgrades including a heated bed (pro model) and a case (expert model.)

=== Solidoodle 3 ===
The Solidoodle 3 was launched on November 16, 2012, to be sold for Black Friday. The Solidoodle 3 featured a larger build area (8 × 8 x 8 inch) and improvements to the heating system for the bed.

==== Updates ====
Responding to customer feedback, Solidoodle released incremental updates to the Solidoodle 3 over the first year of its operation. Solidoodle released updates to the carriage system, build plate, power supply, build platform, and mother board.

=== Solidoodle 4 ===
The Solidoodle 4 was launched on November 22, 2013. The Solidoodle 4 improved on the Solidoodle 3 by adding a protective outer shell. Promotional photographs seem to indicate a suite of cooling fans as well.

=== Solidoodle Workbench ===
The Solidoodle Workbench was announced for pre-order on August 5, 2014, to be sold for $799. It featured a dual extruder, auto-levelling and a 12 × 12 × 12 inch build area.

=== Solidoodle Workbench Apprentice ===
The Solidoodle Apprentice was announced for pre-order on August 5, 2014, to be sold for $1,299. It featured a dual extruder, auto-leveling and a 6x6x8 build area.

=== Solidoodle Press ===
The Solidoodle Press was announced for pre-order on August 5, 2014, for $399. It featured an 8x8x8 build area inside a full enclosure. The Press is the first printer by Solidodle to be manufactured in China and not in their Brooklyn factory.

=== Accessories ===
In addition to the 3D printer, Solidoodle offers a suite of repair parts and accessories for the printers. While most of the parts of the Solidoodle 2, and 3 printers can be found in the online store, Solidoodle does not offer kits.

=== Modding community ===
Due to the machine's relatively low price, and subsequent popularity, all of the Solidoodle printers to date have enjoyed an active modding community, with blogs like Solidoodle Tips leading the way. Solidoodle modifications typically strive to enhance the functionality of the printer in order to achieve the performance of more expensive printers, taking advantage of the machine's relatively sturdy steel gantry system. Common modifications include hot-end and extruder replacements, improved carriage systems, bowden style extrusion systems, build plate replacements, and thread ball screws. Installing a cooling fan at the point of extrusion is a popular modification. This drastically improves the accuracy of prints by allowing the contours to cool rapidly and evenly. This minimises any distortion created by forms that cool unevenly and may buckle during printing. This buckling is persistent in forms like bowls, where the cantilever edge of each layer cools faster than the inside edge of the layer which is kept warmer by its contact with the previous layer. The uneven cooling sees the outside edges shrink inwards and up. As more layers of the print proceed, the extruder can be seen to be pushing the print around with each new layer as the problem of contours leaning inwards and upwards multiplies the distortion. The use of a fan however reduces the binding of the layers with less merging of the surfaces.

=== Service ===
Solidoodle offers free tech support to all of their users, and maintains learning materials on their website for those interested in learning 3D printing.

=== Shutdown ===
On March 28, 2016, Solidoodle shutdown operations, laying off all 70 employees.

== See also ==
- List of notable 3D printed weapons and parts
- List of 3D printer manufacturers
- Instant manufacturing
- Rapid Prototyping
