= ZYX =

ZYX or Zyx may refer to:

- Zyx, a region in the North Caucasus inhabited by the Zygii
- Zyx (cartoonist) (1950–2015), French-Canadian cartoonist
- ZyX (company), a Japanese company that makes erotic video games
- ZYX (gene), a gene that encodes the protein Zyxin
- ZYX (magazine), an American literary newsletter
- ZYX (pop group), a Japanese pop group
- ZYX Music, a German record label
- "ZYX", a song by Gomez on their 2006 album Five Men in a Hut: A's, B's and Rarities 1998–2004
- Zyx, a villain in the American TV series Legion of Super Heroes
- ZYX, a reverse version of the Alphabet Song.

== See also ==
- ZYYX, a Swedish desktop 3D printer
