= Hyrel 3D =

American manufacturer of 3D printers

Hyrel 3D is a company based in Atlanta, Georgia which manufactures 3D printers for home, office and industrial settings. Hyrel 3D makes modular manufacturing machines that are capable of additive and subtractive processes, including fused deposition modeling. These systems use interchangeable heads that are used to create three-dimensional solid or hollow objects from a digital model, which can be designed or produced from a scan.

== History ==
Hyrel 3D was conceived when a team of engineers bought a 3D printer to prototype parts, and decided they had the expertise to do better.

The company sought initial backing through a Kickstarter campaign, launched on September 6, 2012, which received over 300% of the $50,000.00 funding goal.

== Products ==
Hyrel 3D offers four machines:

- The Engine, with an open build space
- The System 30M, with an enclosed build area and filtration system
- 16A - Hydra, floor unit with 5 print head slots (larger build area)
- The Engine HR, a high resolution machine with enhanced precision

== Materials ==
The Hyrel 3D Printers can print with the following materials as of October, 2013:

=== Filament Based ===
- ABS
- PLA
- PET
- Nylon
- Peek

=== Extrudable ===
- Standard:
  - Rubber (Sugru)
  - RTV silicone (Room Temperature Vulcanizing)
  - Ceramic Modelling clay
- Reusable:
  - Oil-Based Modelling clay (Plasticine)
  - Polymer Clay
  - Play-Doh
- Firable:
  - Porcelain
  - Metal clay, including Precious Metal Clay

== See also ==
- 3D printing or Rapid manufacturing
- Additive manufacturing
- Desktop manufacturing
- Digital fabricator
- Instant manufacturing, also known as "direct manufacturing" or "on-demand manufacturing"
- List of 3D printer manufacturers
- Stereolithography
