= Sciaky =

Sciaky may refer to:

- Ed Sciaky (1948–2004), American disc jockey
- Sciaky, Inc., an American manufacturer of metal printing and welding systems
