= Titan 2 (disambiguation) =

Titan 2 or Titan II may refer to:

== Military and space ==
- LGM-25C Titan II, a U.S. intercontinental ballistic missile
  - Titan II (rocket), a U.S. space launch rocket series developed from the ICBM
- MG-332 Titan-2, a sonar system equipped on Soviet Kanin-class destroyer

== Technology ==
- HTC Titan II, a smartphone
- Titan 2, a desktop 3D printer by Kudo3d

== Other uses ==
- Titan 2, a recovery crane ship; see List of vessels built at Crichton-Vulcan and Wärtsilä Turku shipyards

== See also ==
- HTC TyTN II, a smartphone
- Titan (disambiguation)
