= Sindoh =

Korean printer and fax manufacturer

Sindoh 신도
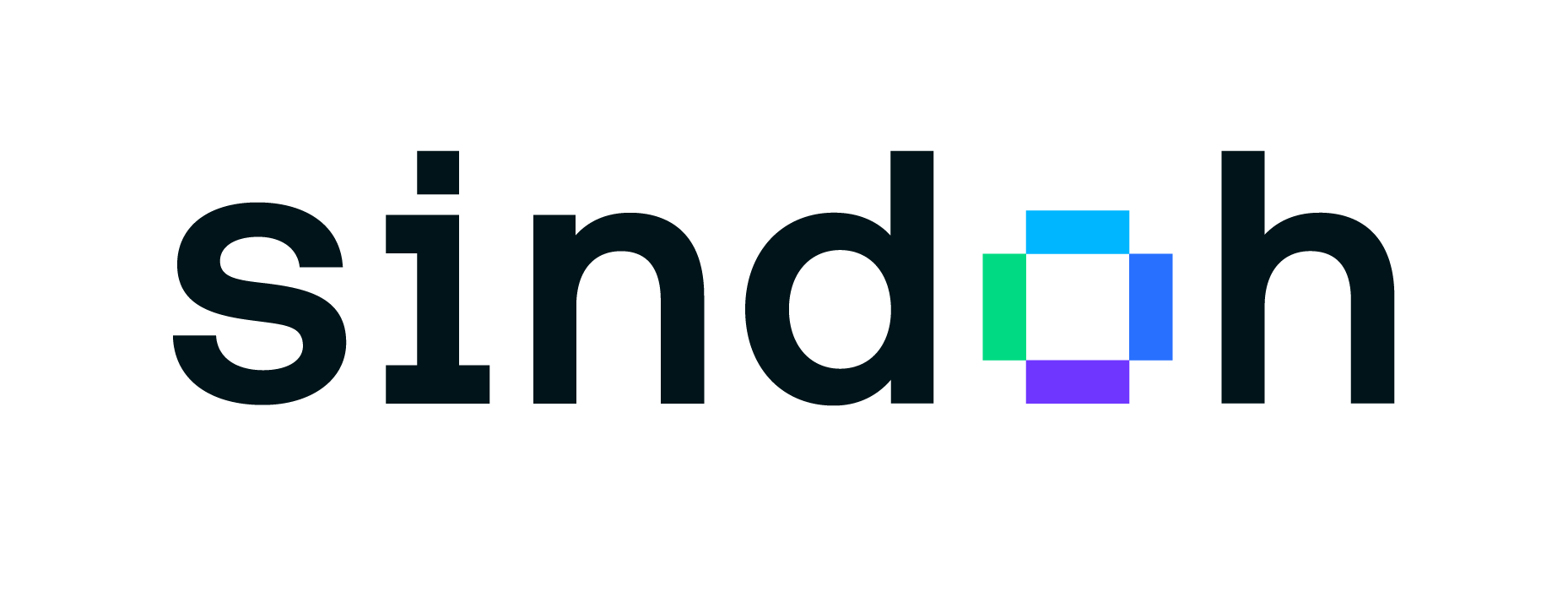
- Type: Public
- Traded as: South Korean Stock Exchange (KRX: 029530)
- Industry: Electronics
- Founded: July 7, 1960; 66 years ago
- Headquarters: Seoul, South Korea
- Key people: Seo Tong-Kyu
- Products: Multi-function printers, printers, 3D printers, facsimile
- Website: www.sindoh.com

- Sindoh
- Hangul: 신도리코
- RR: Sindoriko
- MR: Sindorik'o

Sindoh (Korean: 신도리코), formerly Sindoricoh (신도리코), is a South Korean company that makes multi-function printers, fax machines, Thermal paper and 3D printers. Headquartered in Seoul, South Korea, Sindoh's main market for 2D printers is Korea, the United States, and Europe for its 3D printers.

The company was founded in 1960 under the title of Sindoh Trading Co., Ltd. The name was changed to Sindoh Co., Ltd. in 1969 after the company entered into a partnership with Japanese corporation Ricoh.

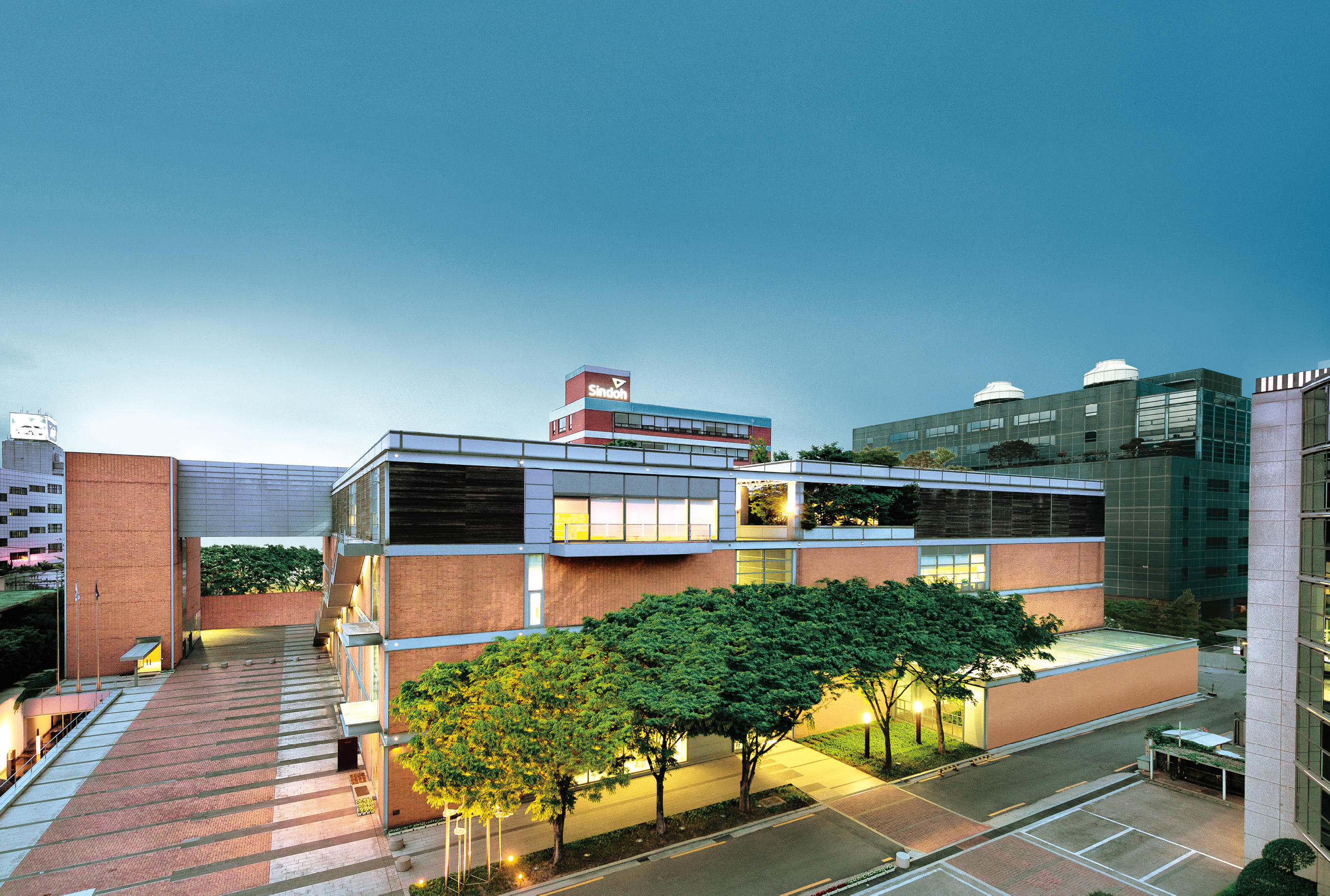
Sindoh Headquarter

== History ==
- 1960: Founded on July 7.
- 1964: Production of RICOPY555, Korea's first copier
- 1969: Signed a partnership with Ricoh, Japan. Produced BS-1, the first electronic copying machine in Korea.
- 1971: Head office construction was completed in Seongsu-dong, Seoul.
- 1975: Produced DT1200, the first plain-paper copier in Korea
- 1981: Produced FAX3300H, Korea's first facsimile
- 1982: Produced Thermal paper for fax
- 1983: Completed the construction of Asan factory
- 1986: Inauguration of CEO and Chairman Woo Sang-gi and CEO and President Woo Suk-hyung
- 1990: Production of High Sensitive Thermal Paper for fax
- 1991: Launched copier FT-1000 with its own technology
- 2003: Launched the operation of Qingdao 1st factory in China
- 2006: Launched the operation of Qingdao 2nd factory in China
- 2014: Launched Sindoh VINA Headquarters (SVH) operation for the Southeast Asian production base
- 2015: Launched Sindoh VINA Marketing (SVM) operation for the Southeast Asian sales base
- 2016: Launched 3DWOX DP200, its first 3D printer.
- 2017: Launched 3DWOX 2X, its first prosumer 3D printer.
- 2017: Launched the operation of Sindoh VINA 2nd factory in Vietnam
- 2017: Launched the official international Sindoh YouTube Channel
- 2018: Launched 3DWOX 1, with better solution
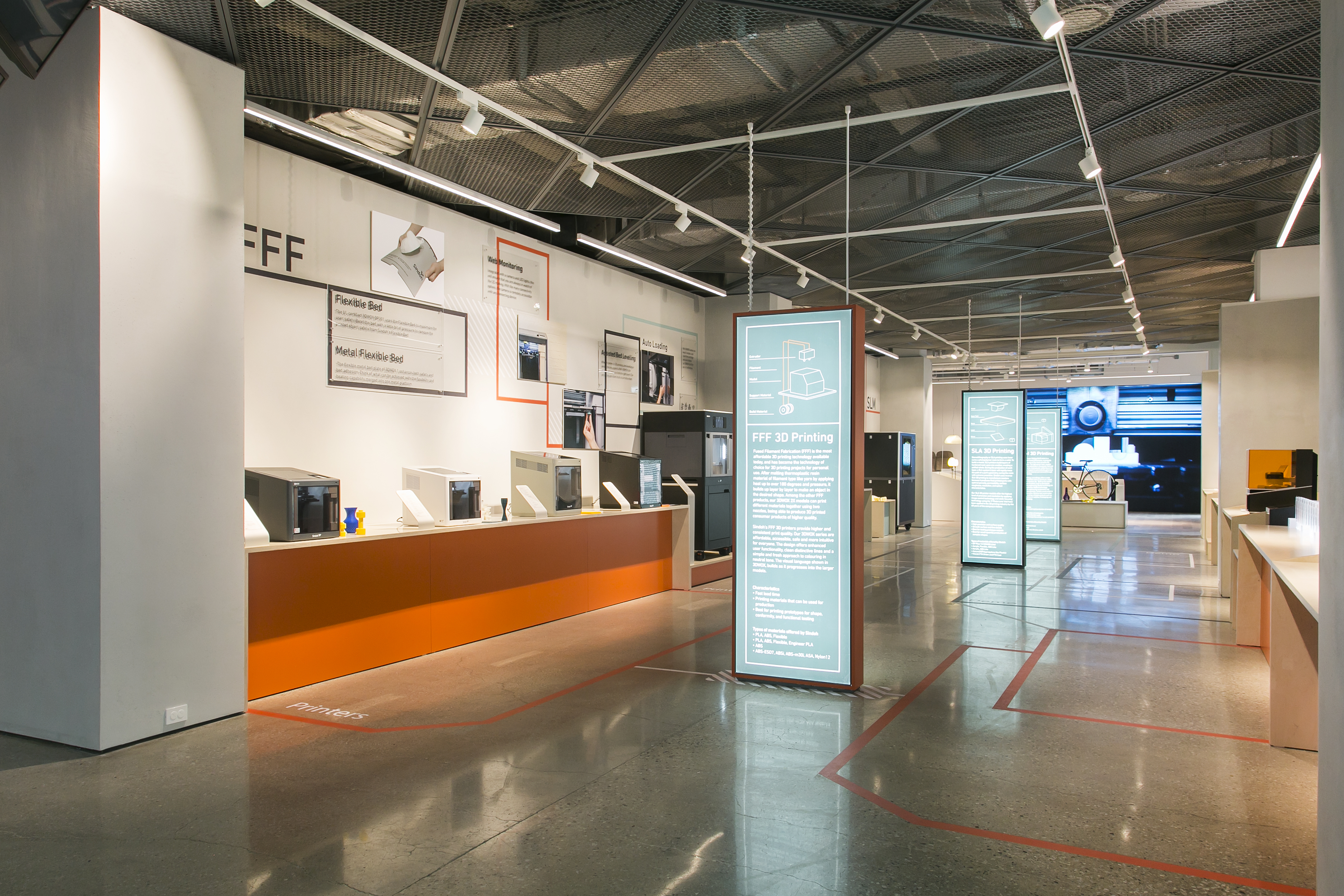
  Sindoh 3D Exhibition(Sindoh Additive Laboratory)
- 2018: Launched 3DWOX 1, with better solution
- 2019: Launched 3DWOX 1X, its substance 3D printer
- 2019: Launched Sindoh A1/A1+, its first and only SLA 3D Printer.
- 2019: Launched 3DWOX 7X, This 3D printer supports large output.
- 2020: Launched Sindoh S100, its first and only SLS 3D Printer.
- 2021: Launched Sindoh A1SD, its first and only MSLA(Masked Stereolithography) & LCD 3D Printer.
- 2022: Launched Sindoh fabWeaver type A530, its new FFF 3D Printer

== Logo ==
Sindoh renewed its corporate identity in 2013, as part of efforts to strengthen its brand.

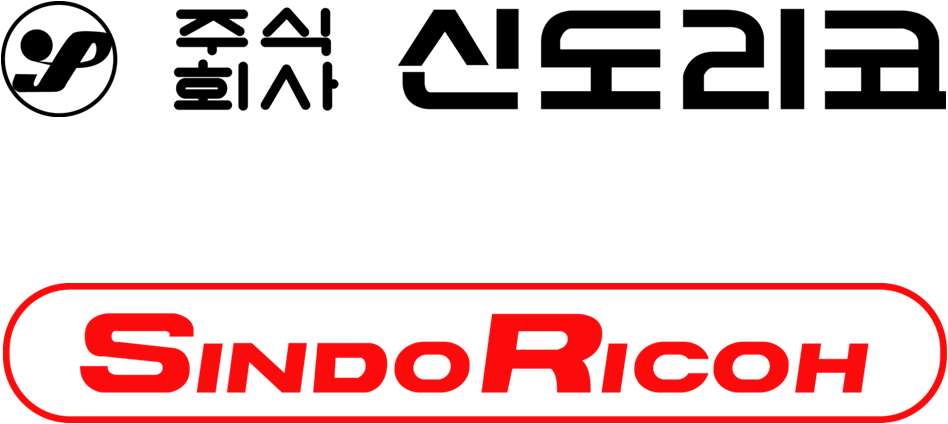
Corporate identity of Sindoh in 1970s

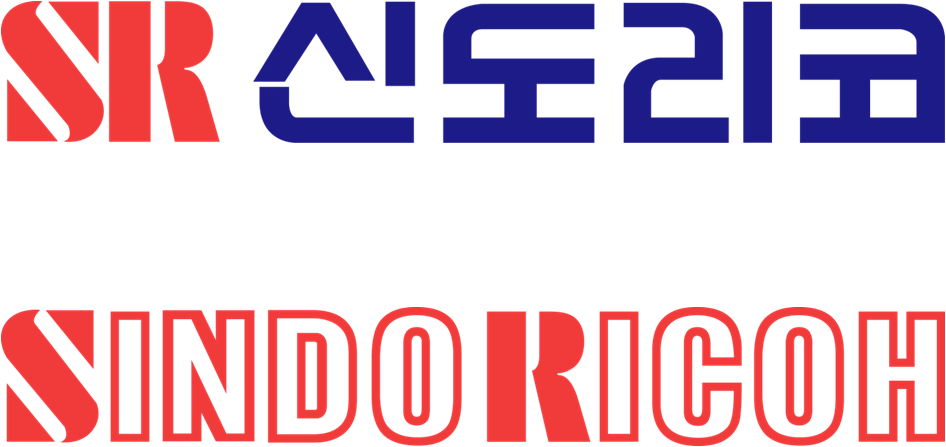
Corporate identity of Sindoh from 1987 to 2002

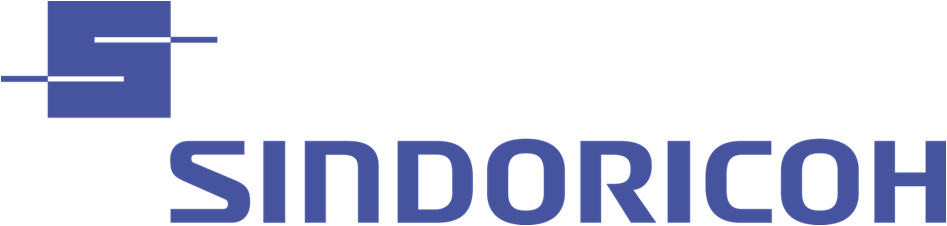
Corporate identity of Sindoh from 2002 to 2008

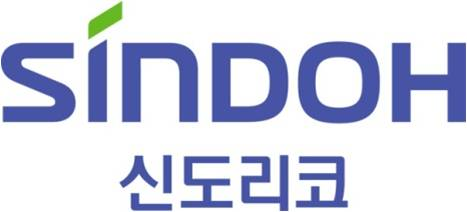
Corporate identity of Sindoh from 2008 to 2013

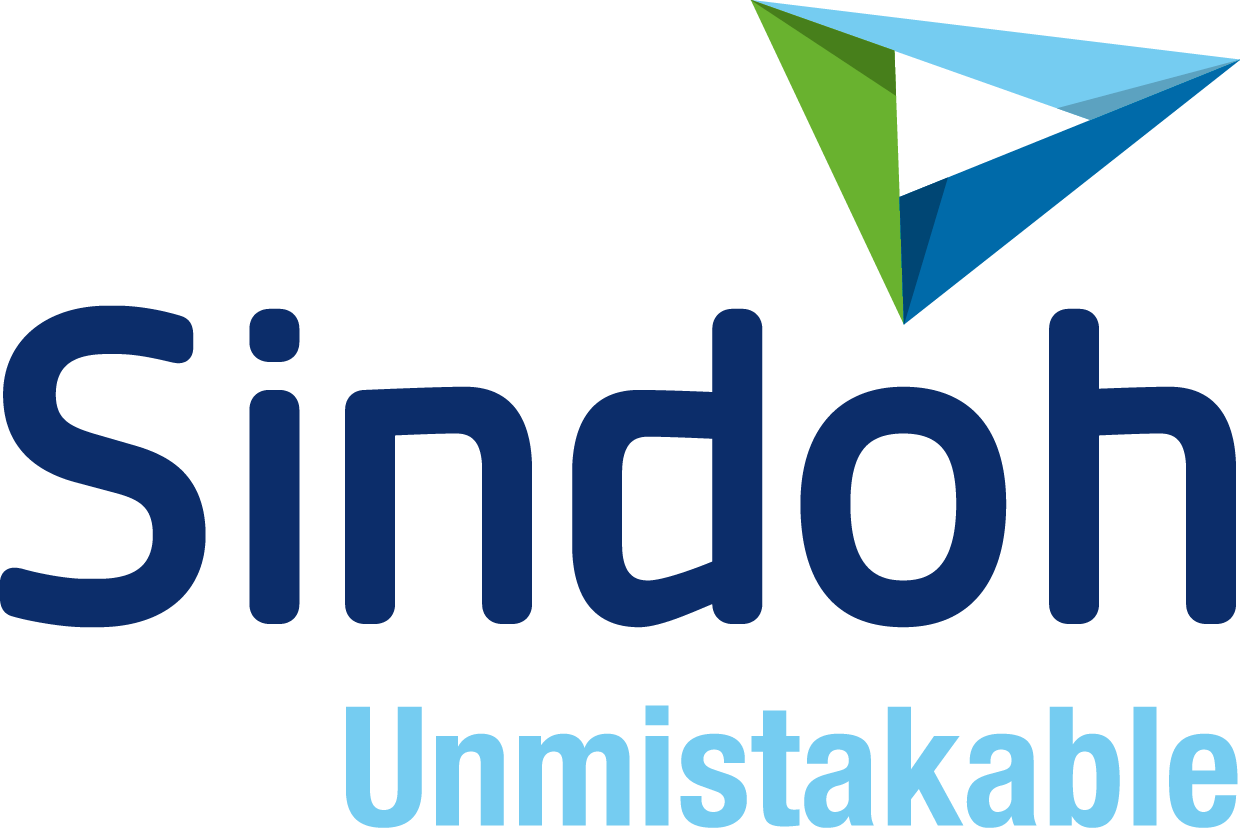
Corporate identity of Sindoh from 2013 to 2025

Corporate identity of Sindoh in 2026

== Printer / Multi-function printer ==
Sindoh produces and sales Mono/Color Multi-function Printer from various A3/A4 lineup.

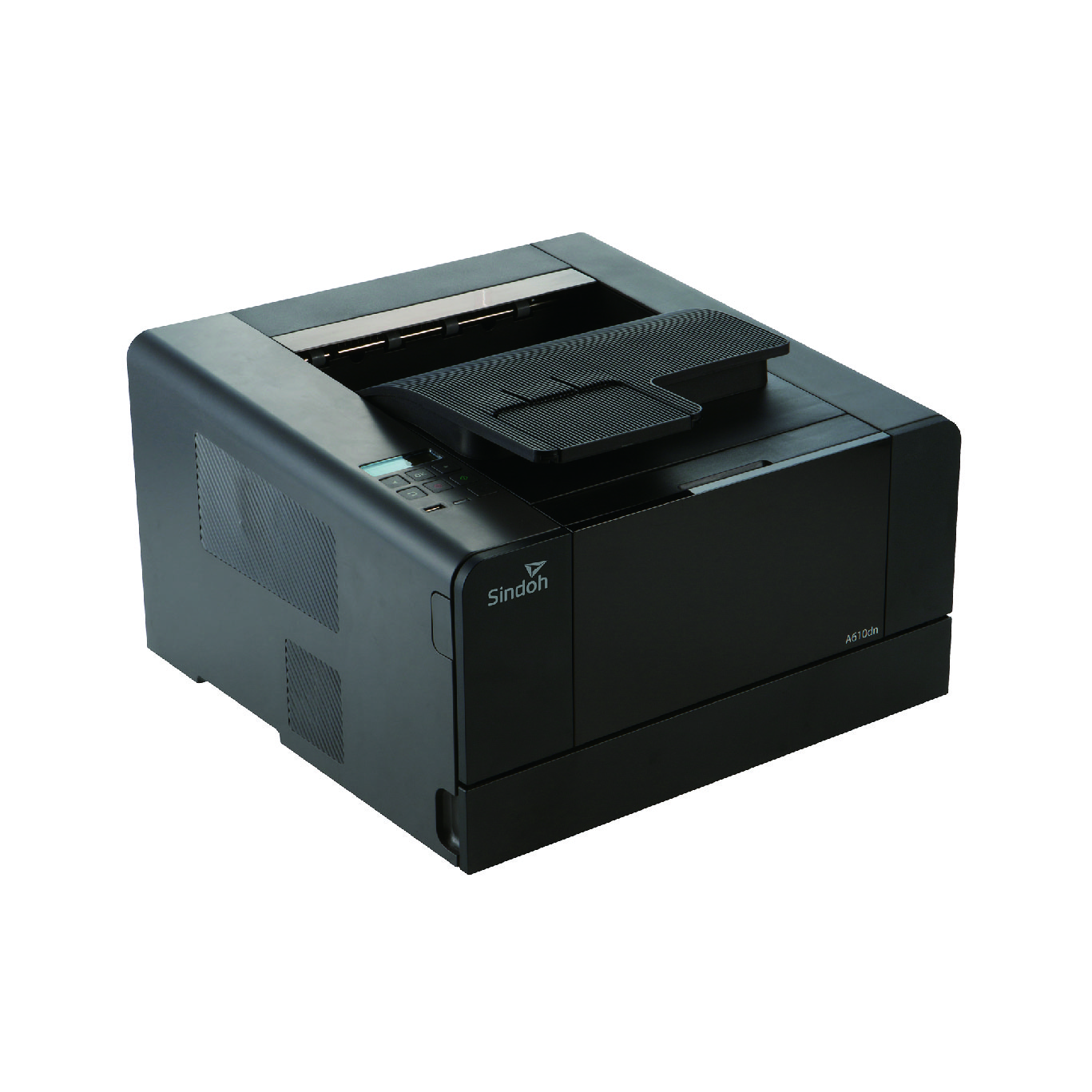
A4 LBP A610dn Series

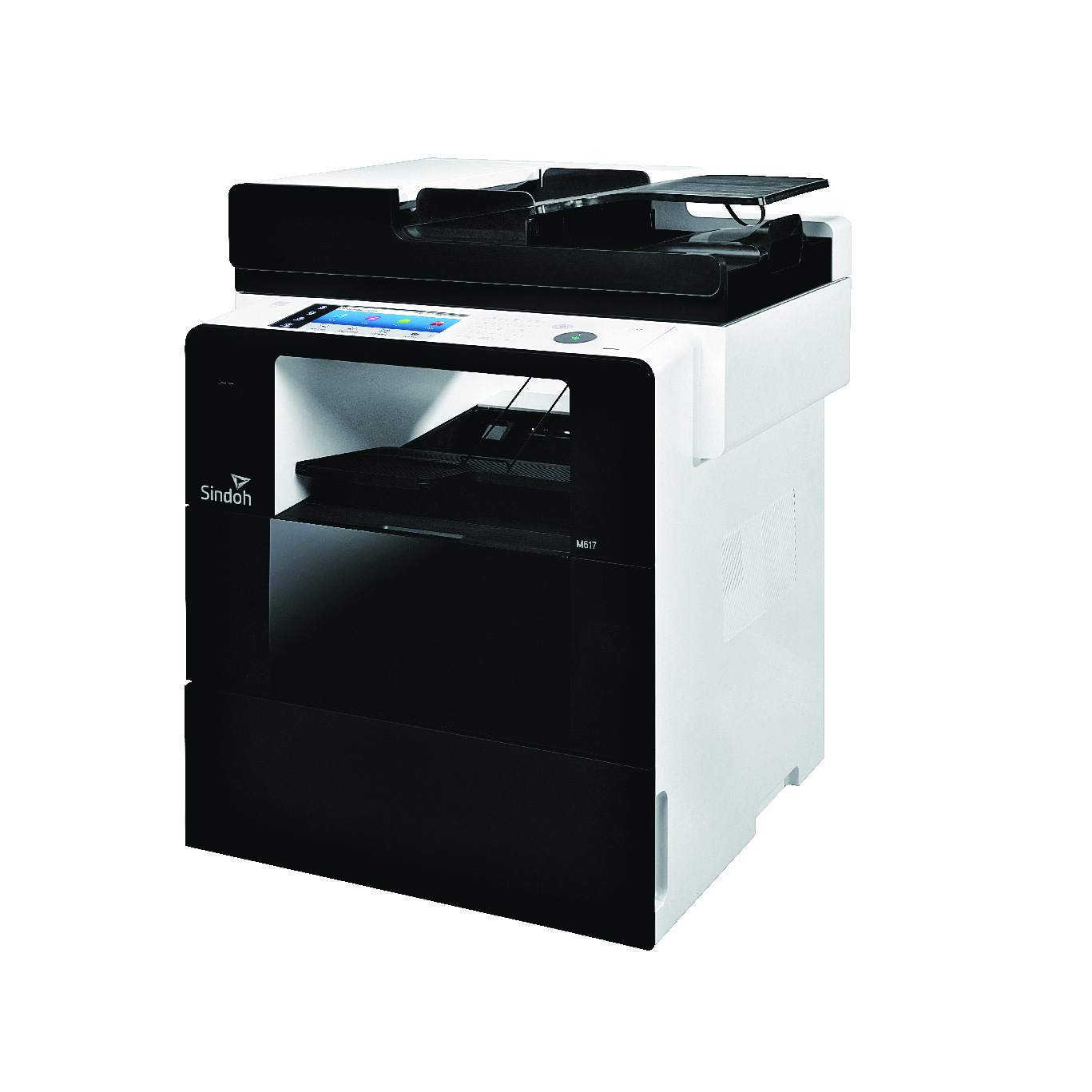
A4 MPF M610 Series

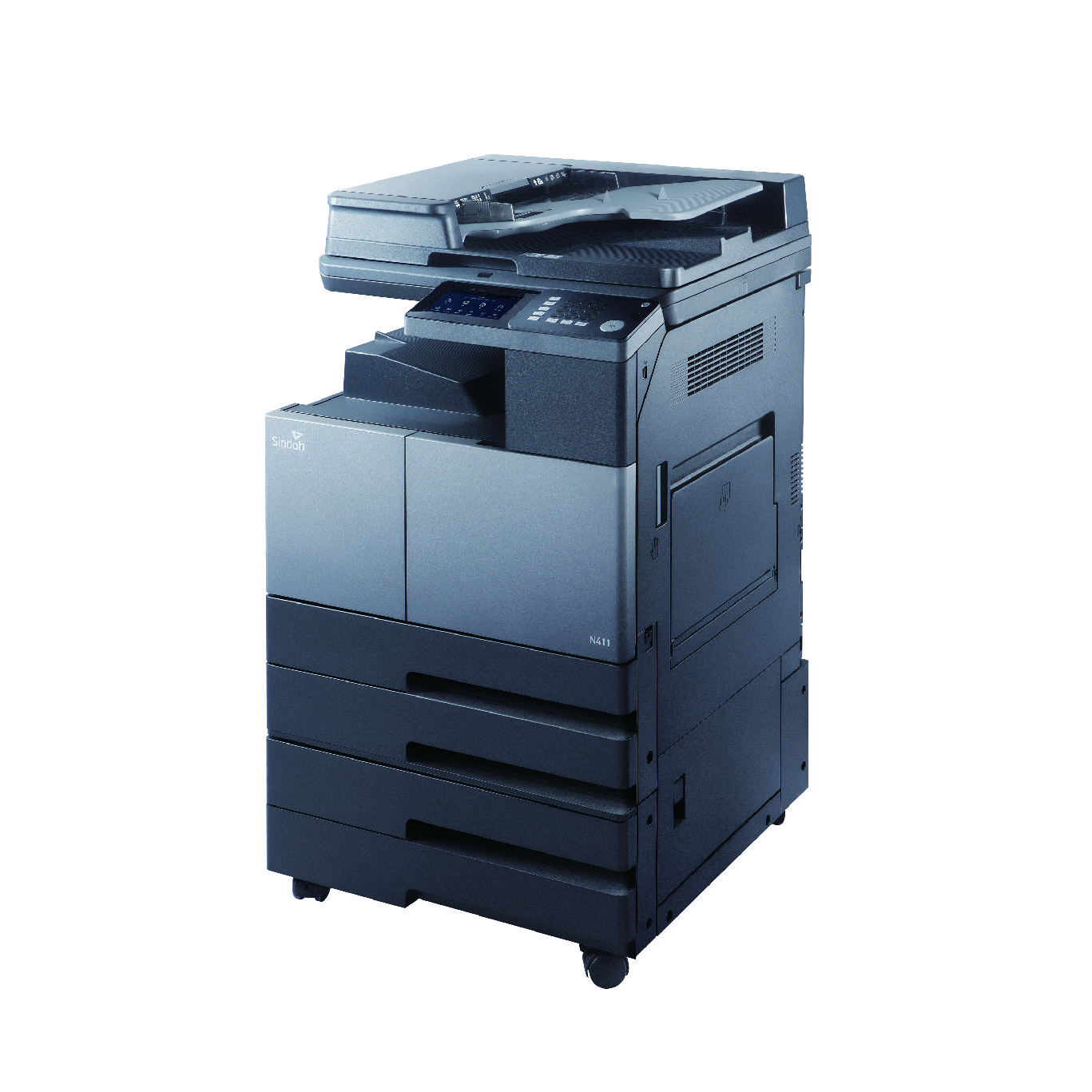
A3 MPF N410 Series

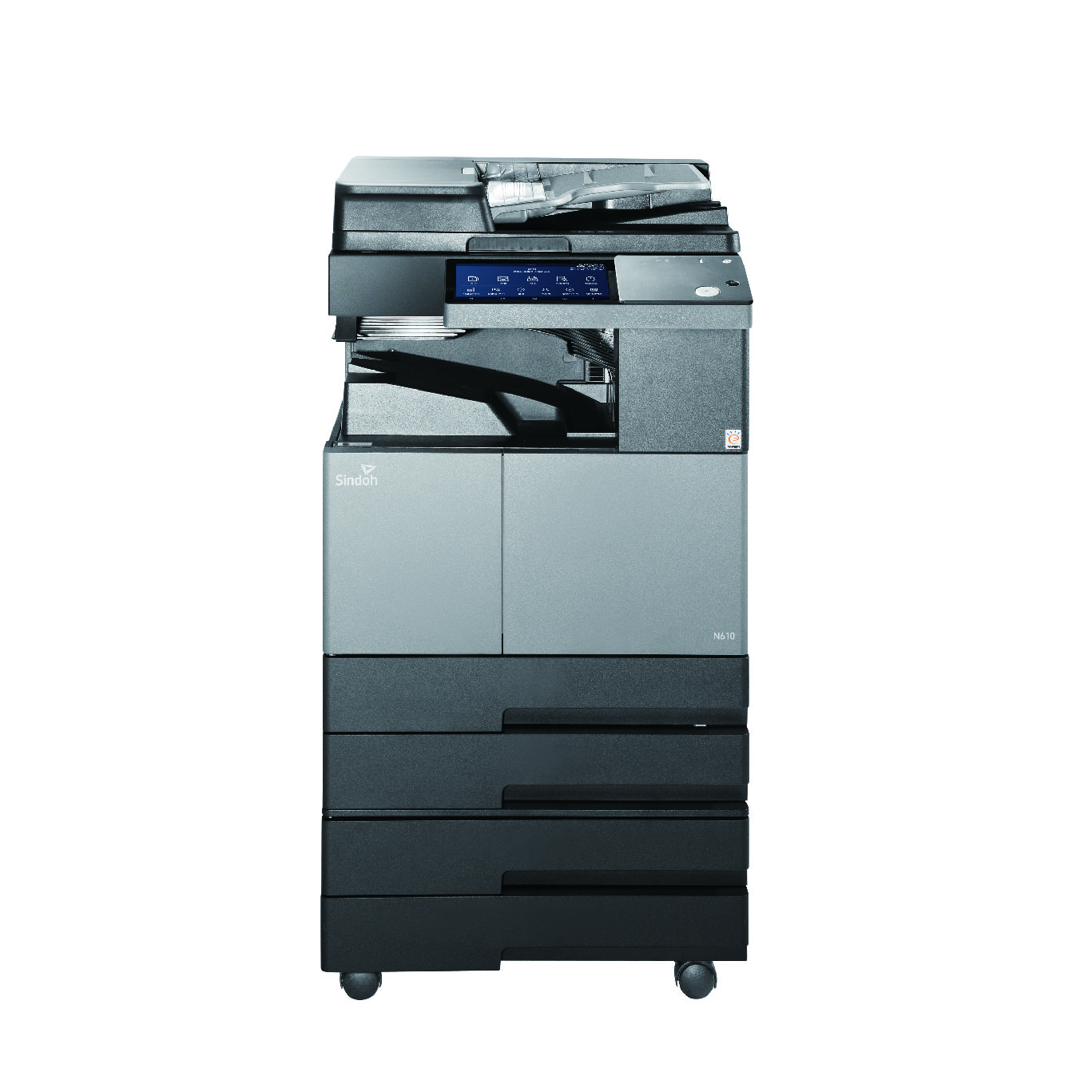
A3 MPF N610 Series

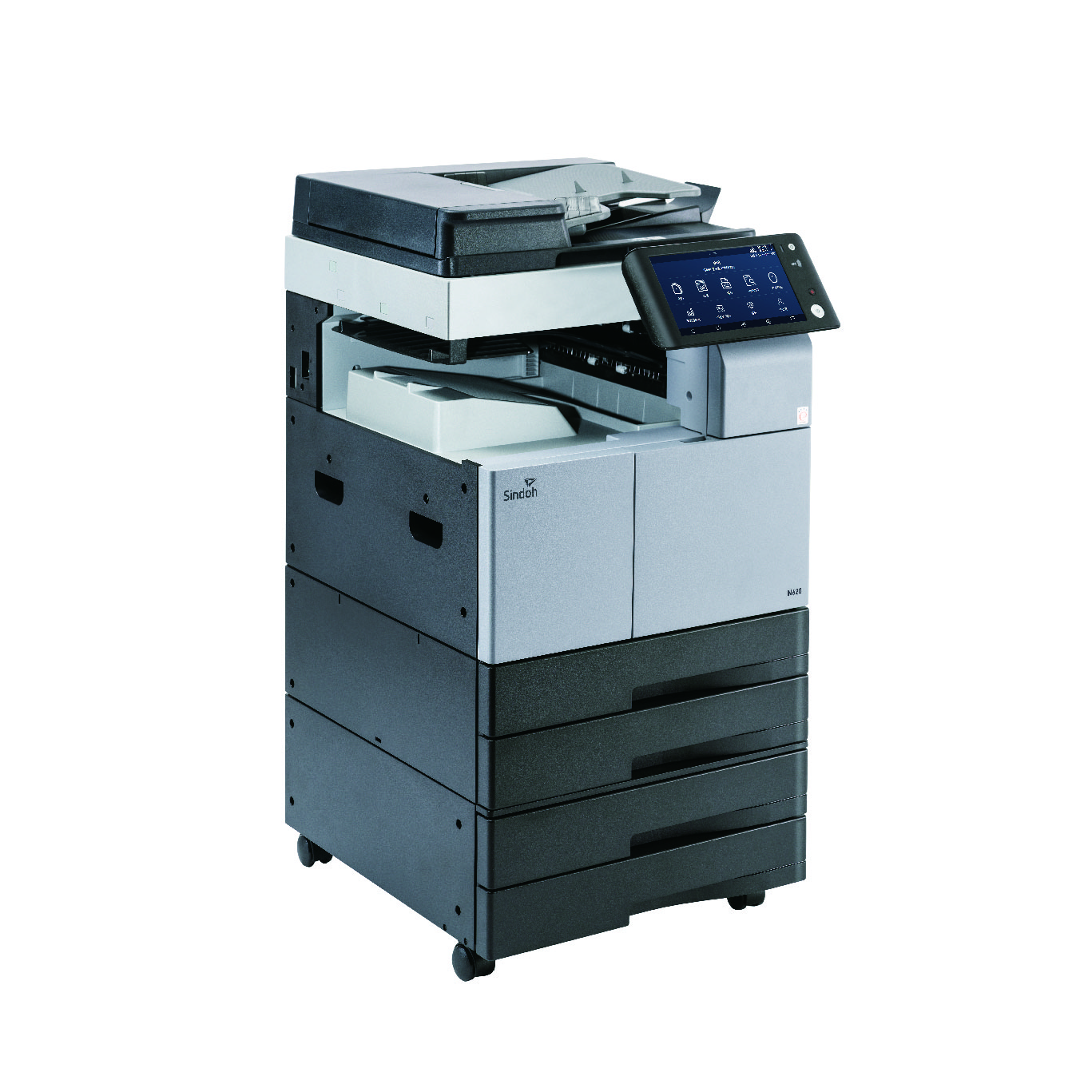
A3 MFP N620 Series

== 3D printers ==
Sindoh entered the 3D printer market with its own brand, 3DWOX. In 2016 the company launched DP200 and DP201, two models under the 3DWOX brand name. The DP200 printer was designed to introduce inexperienced users to 3D printing technology.

In 2016 Sindoh, in conjunction with SolidWorks, introduced 3D-printing software which enables users to 3D print using a CAD program without slicer software. The company entered into a partnership with SolidWorks, developing an "Apps for Kids" program in 2017 which allows children to 3D print easily and from the cloud. And, Sindoh launched 3DWOX 2X. The 3D printer market can be distinguished from the personal consumer market and professional market. 3DWOX 2X was developed in the middle of the market, Prosumer.

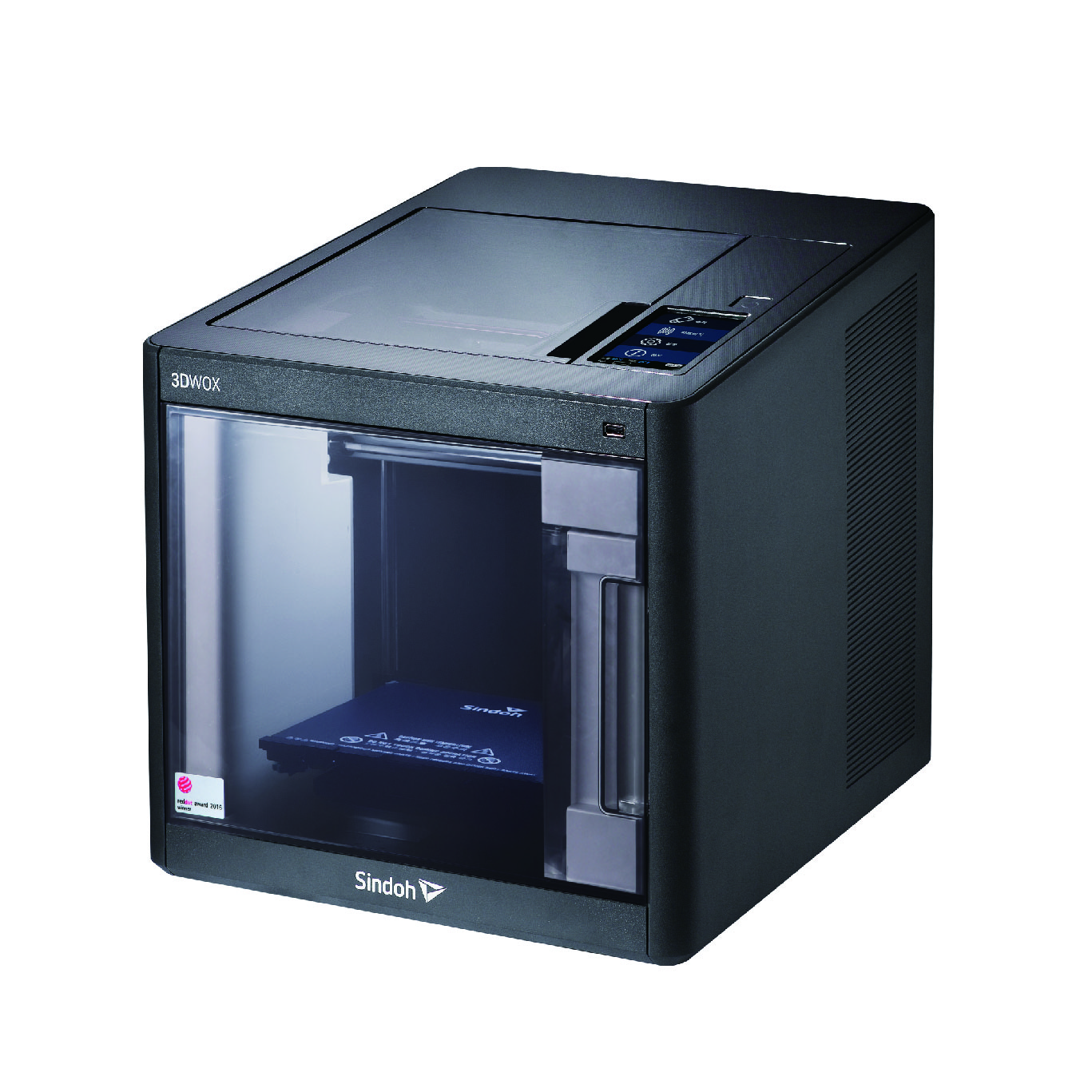
3DWOX DP200

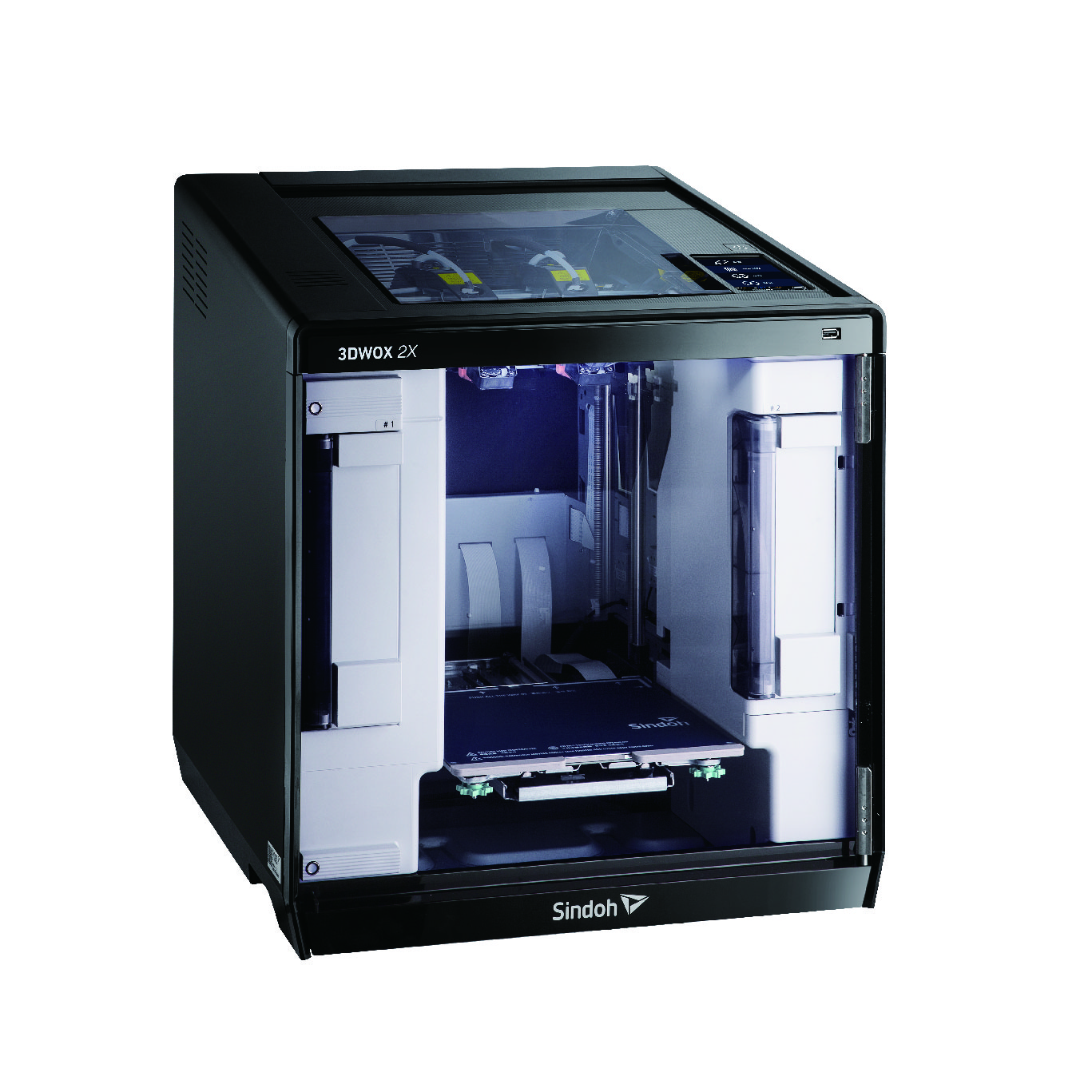
3DWOX 2X

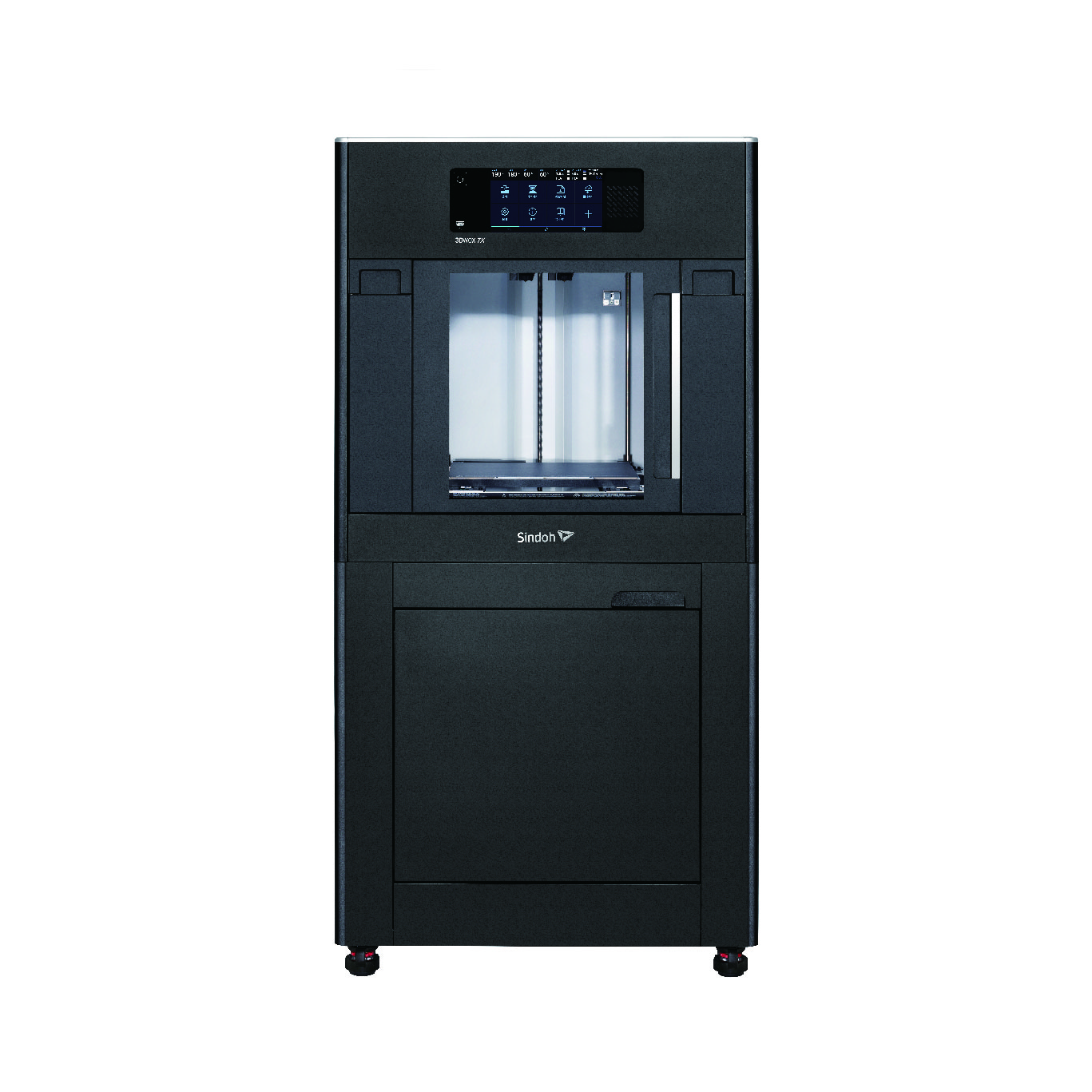
3DWOX 7X

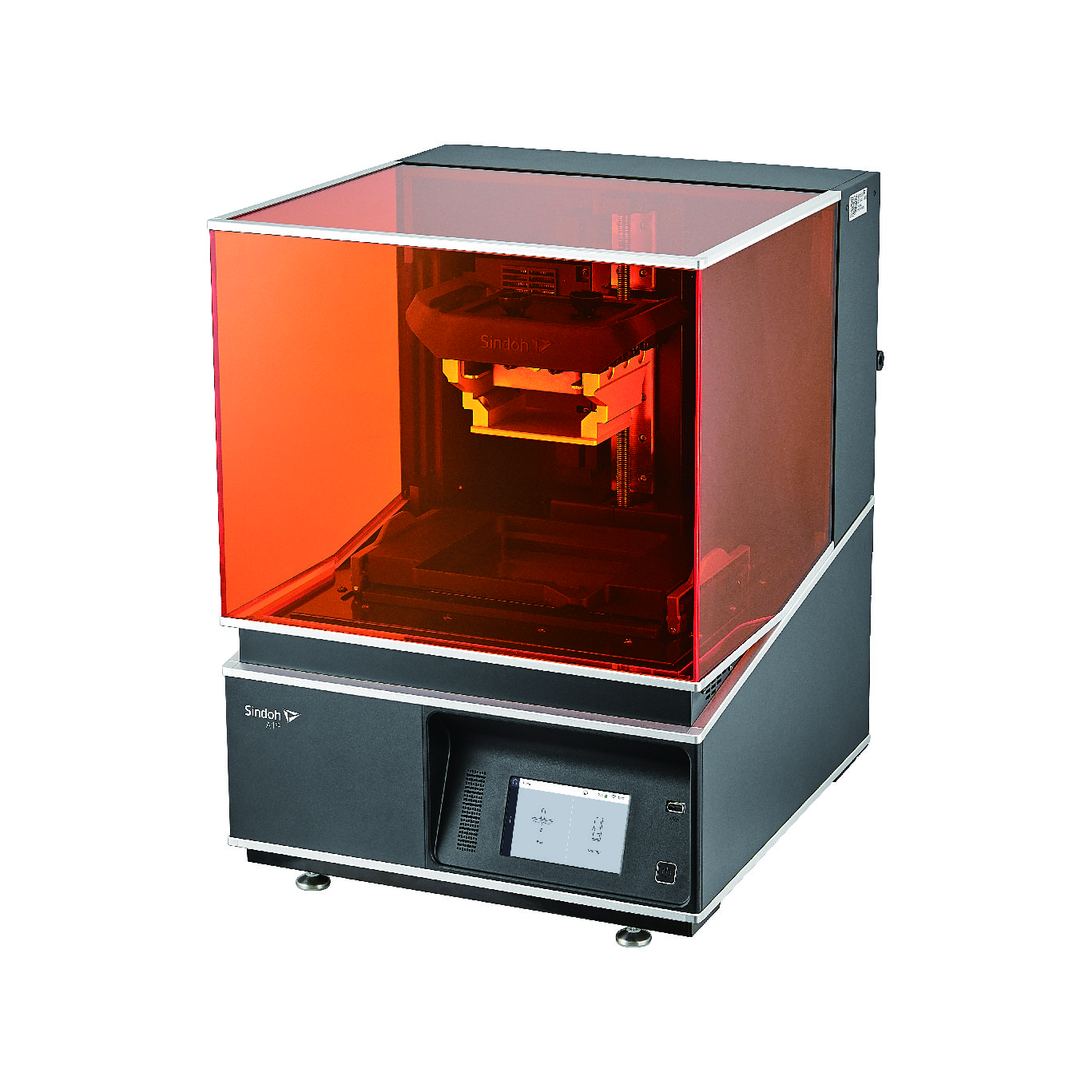
Sindoh A1SD

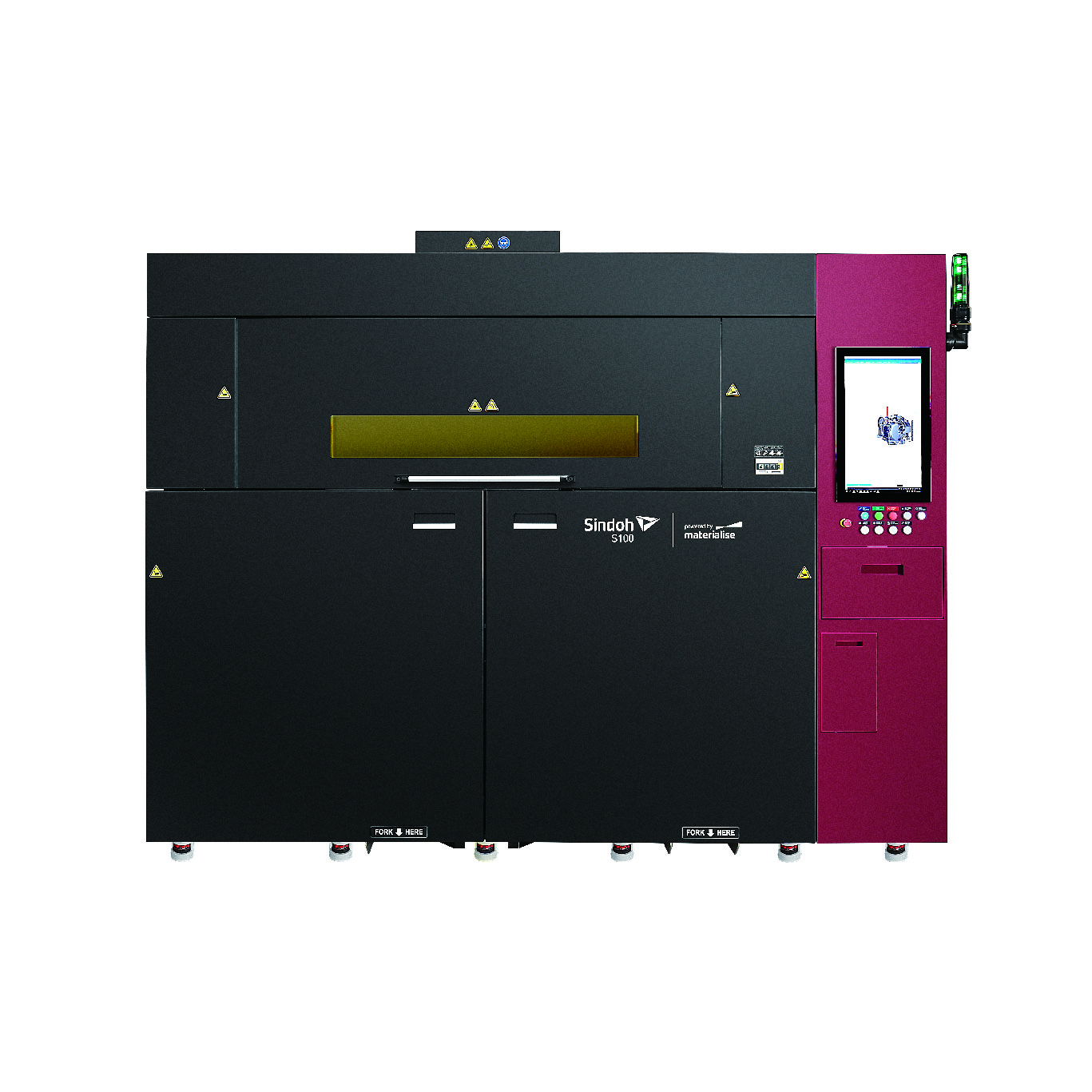
Sindoh S100

== Printing solutions ==
Sindoh offers solutions to optimize corporate printing environments. In 2008, Sindoh introduced their managed printing service (MPS), which reduces maintenance costs of document management.

== See also ==
- Multi-function printer
- List of 3D printer manufacturers
