= Fusion3 =

American 3D printer company

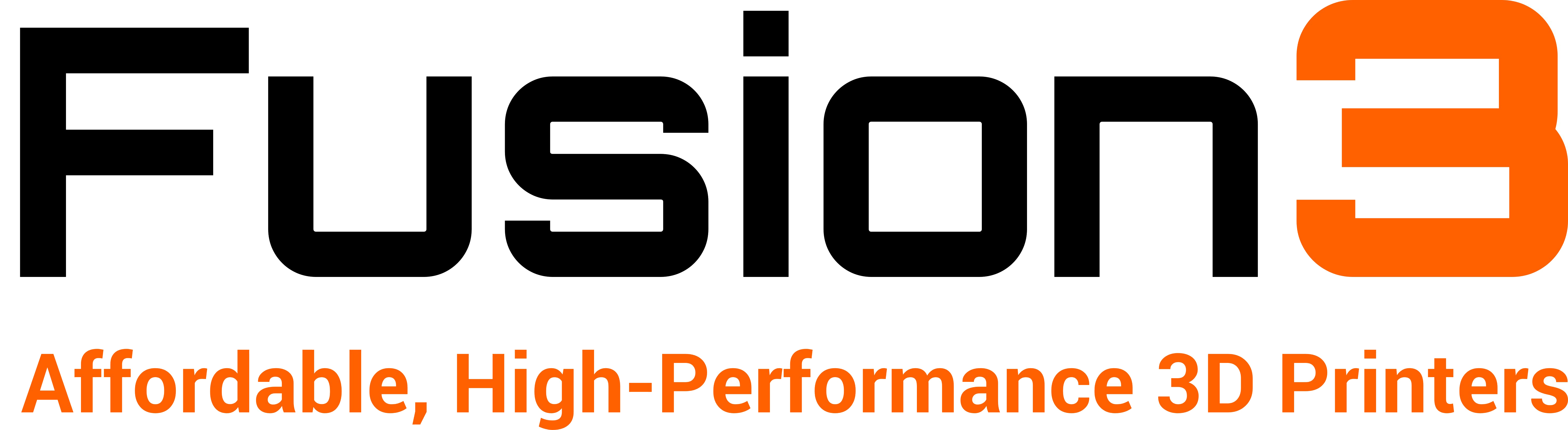
- Industry: 3D printing
- Founded: 2013
- Founder: Katelyn Padgett
- Defunct: 2026
- Headquarters: Greensboro, North Carolina, U.S.
- Key people: Katelyn Padgett (CEO)
- Products: 3D Printers (EDGE, F410, F400-S, F400-HFR, F306 Single Extruder, F306 Dual Extruder)
- Website: www.fusion3design.com

Fusion3 was a Greensboro, North Carolina company which manufactured 3D printers for commercial and education use. Fusion3 3D Printers use fused deposition modeling to create three-dimensional solid or hollow objects from a digital model, which can be designed or produced from a scan.

== History ==
Fusion3 was started by North Carolina State University Alumna Katelyn Padgett who after building several kit 3D printers, developed a proprietary linear motion process to improve upon the existing, open source 3D printer designs. The company began production in 2014 without any external investment. The company received a $25,000 grant from the Innovation Fund of North Carolina in 2014 to invest into patent activities and for marketing purposes.

In June 2026, Fusion3 paused sales of parts and accessories through their online store. In August 2026, an auction was held at Fusion3's Greensboro, North Carolina headquarters to liquidate the company's assets.

== Hardware products ==
=== EDGE ===
Fusion3 released EDGE, a next-generation 3D printer based on the company's patented 'F-Series' motion control system with a continued focus on fast 3D printing of large or many parts with higher temperature/high strength materials, but adding a focus on making their systems even more robust and durable, as well as a focus on ease of use by newer users. EDGE featured both the company's new ANVIL tube print head system, a new bed leveling system, and precision linear rails maintaining the company's fast speeds, but also improving print quality.

=== F410 ===
Fusion3 debuted the F410, an update to the F400, in April 2018. The F410 maintained all the capabilities of the F400 with a number of new features including swappable print heads of different sizes (.4, .6, and .8MM), filament detection that pauses the F410 if you run out of material or encounter a print jam during a print, and a new conductive, automatic bed leveling system.

=== F400 ===
In April 2016, Fusion3 introduced the F400. Available as either a single extruder (F400-S) or what it calls the 'high flow rate' (F400-HFR), the F400 is based the same Core XY framework (F-Series Platform) as its predecessor, the F306. The F400 includes a number of additional features, including an enclosed design, 32-bit controller that enables remote management, and automated bed leveling. The F400 build area can accommodate prints up to 14"x14"x12.6" (1.4 cubic feet).

=== F306 ===
In 2013, Fusion3 introduced the F306 that came in two variants. Available as either a single extruder or dual extruder, the F306 is based on a Core XY framework with an open design, heated bed and E3Dv6 hotend. The F306 build area can accommodate prints up to 12"x12"x12" (1 cubic foot). The F306 line of printers was discontinued in December 2016.

== Software product(s) ==
Fusion3 originally distributed the Simplify3D Creator software slicer software with its 3D printers. In October, 2020, it launched its REACTOR 3D printing software which it bundled as default with all its 3D printers. In 2023 Fusion3 released F3Slic3r, a fork of the open source Prusa Slicer, and announced it would be ending support for the REACTOR 3D software.

== Materials ==
Fusion3 printers can print with the following materials as of March, 2022:

=== Filament based ===
- ABS
- PLA including carbon fiber, ceramic and wood infused compounds
- PET & PETG
- Nylon
- Carbon Fiber filled
- Fiberglass filled
- PCTPE
- ASA
- PC-ABS
- Polycarbonate
- Flexible (TPU / TPE)
- Polyesters
- Polypropylene
- PVDF
- Metal (316L SS)
- Acrylic / PMMA
- Soluble (PVA & HIPS)

== Specifications ==
Variant	F306 (Single)	F306 (Dual)	F400-S	F400-HFR	F410	EDGE
Release date	June 2013	April 2015	April 2016	April 2016	April 2018	February 2022
Build volume	30.5 cm x 30.5 cm x 30.5 cm	29 cm x 29 cm x 29 cm	35.5 cm x 35.5 cm x 32 cm	35.5 cm x 35.5 cm x 31.5 cm	35.5 cm x 35.5 cm x 31.5 cm	35.5 cm x 35.5 cm x 36.5 cm
Layer resolution (min)	50 microns	50 microns	20 microns	20 microns	20 microns	20 microns
Print speed	250 mm/sec					
Filament diameter	1.75mm					
Print head nozzle diameter	.4MM	.4MM	Interchangeable Print Heads, .4MM or .6MM	.8MM	Interchangeable Print Heads, .4MM, .6MM, .8MM	Interchangeable Print Tubes, .4MM, .6MM, .8MM
Print head melt temperature (max)	300*C					320*C
Heated bed temperature (max)	140*C					145*C
Max enclosure temperature (max)	n/a	45*C				70*C
Printer technology	Fused Filament Fabrication (FFF)					
Software	Simplify3D (one license included)				REACTOR (one license included)	
Warranty	6 Months		2 Years			
Technical support (free)	Life of the product					

== See also ==
- 3D printing or Rapid manufacturing
- Additive manufacturing
- Desktop manufacturing
- Digital fabricator
- Instant manufacturing, also known as "direct manufacturing" or "on-demand manufacturing"
- List of 3D printer manufacturers
