= One Piece (disambiguation) =

One Piece is a Japanese manga franchise.

One Piece, OnePiece, or one-piece may also refer to:

- One Piece (1999 TV series), an animated series based on the manga
- One Piece (2000 film), the first film in the franchise
- One Piece (2023 TV series), an American live-action series based on the manga
- One Piece! (1999), a compilation of Japanese short films unrelated to the manga
- ONEPIECE (single volume), a hardcopy of 102 volumes of the One Piece manga series
- OnePiece (music production team), a South Korean music production team
- One-piece swimsuit
- One piece, a modern carbon fibre ice hockey stick

== See also ==
- All in One (disambiguation)
- Onesie (disambiguation)
- Two-piece (disambiguation)
- Three-piece (disambiguation)
