= Two-piece =

Two-piece or Two piece or Two pieces may refer to:

- Bikini, a two-piece swimsuit
- Double act, a comedy duo
- Two-piece band, a musical ensemble with two members, a duo
- Two-piece gel encapsulation, a method of preparing a Capsule (pharmacy) containing a dose of medicine, invented in 1847
- Two piece implant, a form of Abutment (dentistry), a connecting element
- Two-piece lapping, a version of the machining process Lapping
- Two-piece sobralia (Sobralia dichotoma), an orchid found in South America
- Two-piece suit, a set of garments made from the same cloth; see Suit (clothing)
- Two-piece tmRNAs, a type of Transfer-messenger RNA

Music

- "Two Pieces", a song on the record Demi (album) of 2013 by Demi Lovato (born 1992)
- Two Pieces for Piano (1921), a composition by John Ireland (1879–1962)
- Two Pieces for Piano (1925), a composition by John Ireland (1879–1962)
- Two Pieces for Piano (1929-30), a composition by John Ireland (1879–1962)
- Two Pieces for Wind Quintet (Ropartz), a composition of 1924 by Guy Ropartz (1864–1955)

Sculpture

- Knife Edge Two Piece 1962–65, a bronze sculpture by Henry Moore (1898–1986)
- Two-Piece Reclining Figure No. 9, a bronze sculpture of 1967 by Henry Moore
- Two-Piece Reclining Figure: Points, a bronze sculpture of 1969–70 by Henry Moore

== See also ==
- Duo (disambiguation)
- Duet (disambiguation)
- One-piece (disambiguation)
- Three-piece (disambiguation)
