= Three-piece =

Three-piece may refer to:

- Three-piece suit
- Three-piece suite
- Trio, three-piece band or act, a musical ensemble of three performers, for example as:
  - Jazz trio
  - Organ trio
  - Piano trio
  - Power trio
  - String trio
- Ronnie Lane or "Three-Piece", a member of Faces

== See also ==
- Trio (disambiguation)
- Troika (disambiguation)
- Four-piece band
- Quartet
- Two-piece (disambiguation)
- One-piece (disambiguation)
