= M3D, LLC =

American manufacturer of 3D printers

- Type: Private
- Industry: Digital printing
- Founded: April 2014 in Bethesda, Maryland
- Founders: Dr. Michael Armani; David Jones
- Headquarters: Fulton, Maryland, United States
- Key people: David Jones (President) Dr. Michael Armani (CEO)
- Number of employees: 25 (Oct 2014)
- Website: printm3d.com

M3D, LLC is an American manufacturer of 3D printers in Fulton, Maryland. The company's flagship product is the "Micro 3D" or "Micro".

The company was founded by David Jones and Michael Armani, natives of Maryland and both graduates of the University of Maryland, College Park. Armani has a Ph.D. in bioengineering and Jones has a computer science degree.

== Business model ==
=== Startup ===
Financing leading up to launch of M3D was obtained by the founders through personal finances amounting to US$150,000. Subsequent funding for M3D was obtained through a Kickstarter campaign aimed at pre-sales of Micro units. The price point for the Micro was US$299 (Note: The price point for the earliest investors was $199.) and the initial fundraising goal was US$50,000, which was reached 11 minutes after the campaign's launch; the campaign went on to raise a total of US$3,400,000 through pre-sale of 11,000 units.

In August 2016, M3D released a new 3D printer aimed at more experienced users named the M3D Pro. It ran on Kickstarter for 45 days until its conclusion on October 1, 2016 after raising over US$50,000.

As of May 2017, the M3D Pro had raised over US$960,000. It was announced as publicly available for purchase with a 2-week delivery time. The announcement also revealed the option of "Using a 750-micron nozzle to fuse plastic layers together with a stronger bond, M3D believe the structural printing mode to be unique." At the same time as the M3D Pro announcement, M3D also announced a 2017 version of the original Micro 3D Printer, the Micro+, which differs by having an ARM-core processor, enabling double the print speed, and better third party software integration, according to one article.

In late 2017 and early 2018, the M3D Pro began shipping out to Kickstarter backers. Unfortunately, the Pro was very short lived. With quality control issues, glitches in the proprietary software, and difficulties filling Kickstarter backers with actual working units, the printer was in a constant state of delay. Shortly after its availability to the general public in 2018, the M3D Pro was pulled from the official M3D store and no longer available for purchase.

As of early 2022, the company website appears to only show printer documentation and software drivers, with no ability to purchase new printers. This leads most to believe that the company is either winding down and closing up shop or has already done so.

=== Consumer market ===
The company's business model is to address the consumer market with a low cost, small form, simple to program unit. The Micro was described in October 2014 as "one of the lowest-priced personal 3-D printers that you don't have to build yourself." The form of the unit is a 7-inch cube weighing 2 pounds. The initial Kickstarter price point of $299 has not been maintained, but increased to $349 by October 2014. This low cost was achieved through reduction of "power consumption by a factor of 10 compared to professional 3D printers", and the use of locally sourced, standardized electronics.

=== Consumables Market ===
The company also produces 3D Ink (Filament) used in 3D printing, including color changing 3D Ink which responds to temperature.

In 2016 the company announced Tough 3D Ink, which "bonds seamlessly at full strength and can be as rigid or flexible as you want," and ABS-R 3D Ink, an alternative to ABS with less odor that "bonds "better, warps less, and doesn’t require a heated print bed." It is, however, not ABS, but regular PETG.

=== Industrial 3D Printing ===
In June, 2017 the company announced the Promega, its first large-format 3D printer. The printer has a 20" cubed outer dimension and offers a 15.3" cubed print volume, which its stated to be one of the most space efficient printers made. It also uses a newly released "Compound" print head, which takes an input of two filaments and combines the flows into a single extrusion, allowing printing of individual materials or mixing of materials as long as they have similar printing temperatures.

=== Color 3D Printing ===
In April 2018, the company launched the Quad, a 4-color mixing extruder on Kickstarter. In June, 2018 the company announced the Crane Quad Color 3D Printer which also leverages the Duet3D.

== Operations ==
The company was founded in Bethesda, Maryland, but moved into new offices in Fulton, Maryland in late 2014.

As of October 2014, M3D employed 25 people, with plans to multiply that number within a year. As of April 2016, M3D employed 70 people, citing local hires to fill positions in customer/technical support teams, marketing/design, engineering, software development, and management teams. Manufacture of the Micro units takes place in a plant in Howard County, Maryland which opened in October 2014.

== Corporate governance ==
As of its founding in 2013, Dr. Michael Armani held the post of CEO and David Jones held the post of president of M3D.

== See also ==
- List of 3D printer manufacturers
