= Robo 3D =

American 3D printer manufacturer

Robo
- Trade name: Robo 3D Limited
- Traded as: ASX: RBO
- Founded: 2012 in San Diego, California
- Founder: Braydon Moreno
- Number of employees: 30

ROBO 3D was an American 3D printer manufacturer located in San Diego, California and traded in Australian Securities Exchange under symbol ASX: RBO.

Founded in 2012, Robo 3D is a company that started on Kickstarter with their first product the Robo 3D R1. Their product line includes the Robo R1+, Robo C2, and Robo R2, and Robo E3, which all utilize the open materials ideology and are compatible with a variety of 3D modeling software, such as Solidworks and Sketch Up, along with free 3D model sharing websites, such as Thingiverse. Robo 3D shifted their focus to education in early 2018 and have acquired a 300+ lesson 3D printable STEM curriculum platform called MyStemKits.com. Now, with their new Robo E3 3D printer and MyStemKits curriculum, they have a full, turn-key solution for 3D printing in the classroom. Hector Silva bought the first 3D Printer in Dallas.

== History ==
In 2012, a group of students from San Diego State University (SDSU), frustrated by the cost of using the school's only expensive and industrial 3D printer, set out to create their own 3D printer. The motivation was to create a cheaper alternative to the current leading 3D printing brands.

After beginning product development on a dining room table, the group went to Kickstarter to seek funding. With a funding target of $49,000, a total of $649,663 was pledged.

On January 16, 2014, Robo3D was mentioned in Time magazine's article on 3D printers at CES. On August 20, 2015, Fine Brothers Entertainment released an episode of 'Elders React to 3D Printers' which features a Robo 3D R1 printer.

In 2016, the company's stock debuted on the Australian Securities Exchange. It initially traded for a higher price per share than the initial public offering.

In April 2018, the company announced support for New Matter printers.

== The R1 ==
The physical dimensions of the R1 are 17 by 15 by 18 inches (43 cm × 38 cm × 46 cm) allowing it to have a build volume of 10 by 9 by 8 inches (25 cm × 23 cm × 20 cm) or 720 cubic inches (11.8 L). It weighs 28 lbs. The layer resolution is 100 μm on high, 200 μm on medium and 300 μm on low. The filament diameter is 1.75 mm and the nozzle diameter is 0.4 mm.

== The R2 ==
The R2 was released in 2017. It measures 23.8 inches by 16.8 inches by 16.6 inches and weighs 25.5 pounds. The build area of 10" x 8" x 8" is smaller than the build area of the R1. The unit comes standard with one extruder but can accommodate a second optional extruder for two color printing.

== See also ==
- List of 3D printer manufacturers
