= Zortrax =

Polish manufacturer of 3D printers

Zortrax S.A.
- Company type: joint-stock company
- Industry: 3D printing
- Founded: 2013
- Founder: Rafał Tomasiak, Marcin Olchanowski
- Headquarters: Olsztyn, Poland
- Key people: Mariusz Babula (CEO)
- Products: Zortrax Endureal, Zortrax M300 Dual, Zortrax M200 Plus, Zortrax Inventure, Zortrax M300, Zortrax M200, Z-SUITE software
- Website: zortrax.com

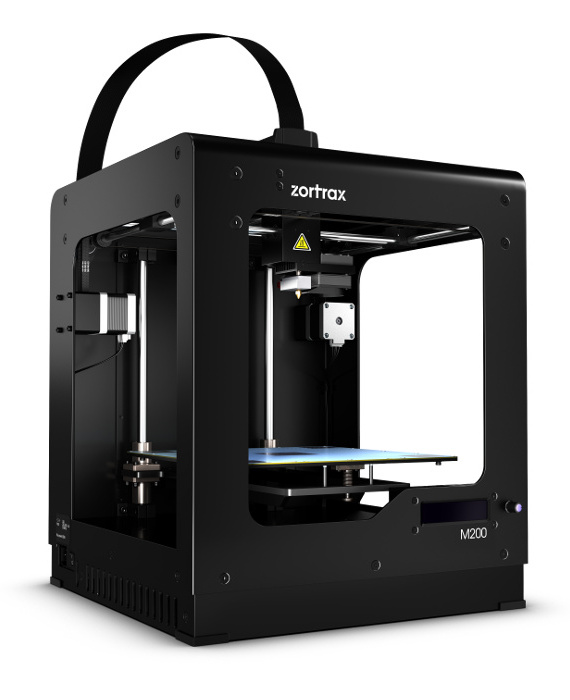
Zortrax M200 3D printer

Zortrax is a Polish manufacturer of 3D printers and filaments for SMB market and rapid prototyping for industries, including robotics and automation, architecture, industrial design, engineering, aviation, industrial automation. Zortrax machines work with dedicated software, firmware and filaments.

== History ==
Zortrax was founded by Rafal Tomasiak and Marcin Olchanowski.

Work on M200 started in 2011 and completed in 2013. On December 3, 2015 Zortrax opened its showroom in Warsaw, Poland – the Zortrax Store.

In 2016, the company launched Zortrax M300.

In 2018, Zortrax launched Inkspire, a desktop resin 3D printer. It is an upgrade to traditional stereolithography printers.

In 2020, Zortrax collaborated with the European Space Agency to develop a technology that enables the production of 3D printing composite parts using two blends of PEEK filament.

== Technology ==
Zortrax manufactures Layer Plastic Deposition (LPD) technology. The technology is using three-dimensional data to create three-dimensional model in layer after layer process.

Layer Plastic Deposition is a technology in which printer is melting thermoplastic material (filament) in the extruder and apply it precisely on heated platform layer after layer.

Zortrax Z-SUITE software is created specifically for Zortrax machines. Z-SUITE allows to open a .stl, .obj or .dxf file and set printing preferences. It is dedicated for both Windows and Mac users. Zortrax developed an application for storing and downloading 3D models - the Zortrax Library.

== See also ==
- List of 3D printer manufacturers
