= Onesie =

Onesie or onesies may refer to:

- Onesie (jumpsuit), adult jumpsuit for relaxing or sleeping
- Onesie (infant bodysuit), a garment worn by babies
- Knucklebones, a children's game, is also called onesies
- Onesies (Bluey), an episode of the Australian animated television series Bluey

== See also ==
- Onesie Wednesday, a day to show support for anyone on the autistic spectrum
- Onesi Constituency, Namibia
- oneSIS, open-source software tool
- One Size Fits All (disambiguation)
- One-piece (disambiguation)
