= 3D makeR Technologies =

Colombian manufacturer of 3D printers

- Industry: 3D printing
- Founded: 2014; 12 years ago
- Founder: Carlos Camargo (CEO)
- Headquarters: Barranquilla, Colombia
- Products: PEGASUS
- Website: www.somosmaker.com

3D makeR Technologies (makeR) is a 3D printer manufacturer. The company started out as an open-source printer company. It was founded between Barcelona and Santa Marta by Carlos Camargo, who currently acts as the CEO of the company.

Following the traditional RepRap project model, the makeR's first products were as do it yourself kits with an alternative version based on open-source FDM 3D printer Prusa i3, called Prusa Tairona. Current makeR 3D printers are designed with a closed frame and selected build sizes.

== Products ==
Their product line includes the 3D printer series PEGASUS. The makeR 3D printers are compatible with polylactic acid (PLA), acrylonitrile butadiene styrene (ABS), thermoplastic polyurethane (TPU), high-impact polystyrene (HIPS), polyvinyl alcohol (PVA) and some specials materials for industrial needs, such as PLA filament mixed with particles of metals which through sanding 3D printed parts provide appearance similar to metals (steel, copper, and aluminium). Also, makeR printers print with nylon and carbon fiber.

== See also ==
- Airwolf 3D
