= All in One (film) =

1938 short film

- All in One (film) 1938
- Release date: 1938
- Running time: 11 minutes
- Country: United States
- Language: English

All in One is an 11-minute 1938 sponsored film which compares dogs to the latest cars. It starts off with a sheep dog, then talks about how dogs are man's best friend. It then has a group of kids building a go-kart with some dogs pulling it and then talks about the features of latest cars. It's actually an advertisement for Chevrolet and was produced by the Jam Handy Organization.
