= Mcor Technologies Ltd =

Irish 3D printing system manufacturer

Mcor Technologies Ltd was engaged in the design, development and manufacture of paper-based 3D printing systems. The company was founded in 2005 and was based in Dunleer, County Louth, Ireland. The company is in liquidation since 2019 and has ceased trading. The assets and IP of Mcor were purchased by CleanGreen3d Limited in October 2019.

== History and technology ==
In 2003, Mcor founders Dr. Conor MacCormack and Fintan MacCormack developed paper 3D technology. This is unlike Laminated object manufacturing (LOM) technology, developed by Helisys Inc. (now Cubic Technologies). Whereas LOM technology uses rolls of adhesive-coated paper and a knife or laser to cut a shape, paper 3D printing uses sheets of standard business A4 and letter paper, an adhesive dispensing system and a tungsten-tip blade to cut the shape. As in many other rapid prototyping processes, the part to be printed is built up from multiple thin cross sections of the 3D model created via computer aided design (CAD) software.

After going a few years without official funding, in 2014, Mcor Technologies secured 2 rounds of venture funding which totaled $32 million, making it the largest amount raised by any 3D printing company that year.

Mcor Technologies Limited entered into receivership 21 March 2019. CleanGreen3D Limited purchased the assets of Mcor Technologies on 29 November 2019.

== Colour 3D printing ==
Some Mcor 3D printers can print parts in colour. This is achieved by depositing coloured ink on each sheet of paper – using a modified two-dimensional inkjet paper printer – and then loading those sheets of paper into the section of the printer where the cutting and gluing occurs. Colour 3D printing can be used to replicate the appearance of buildings, maps, products, anatomy, and molecular structures. It can also add annotations to prototypes, display the results of structural analyses (i.e., finite element analysis) and used to produce consumer products.

== See also ==
- 3D printing
- Rapid prototyping
