= Metal clay =

Craft material of metal particles and a plastic binder

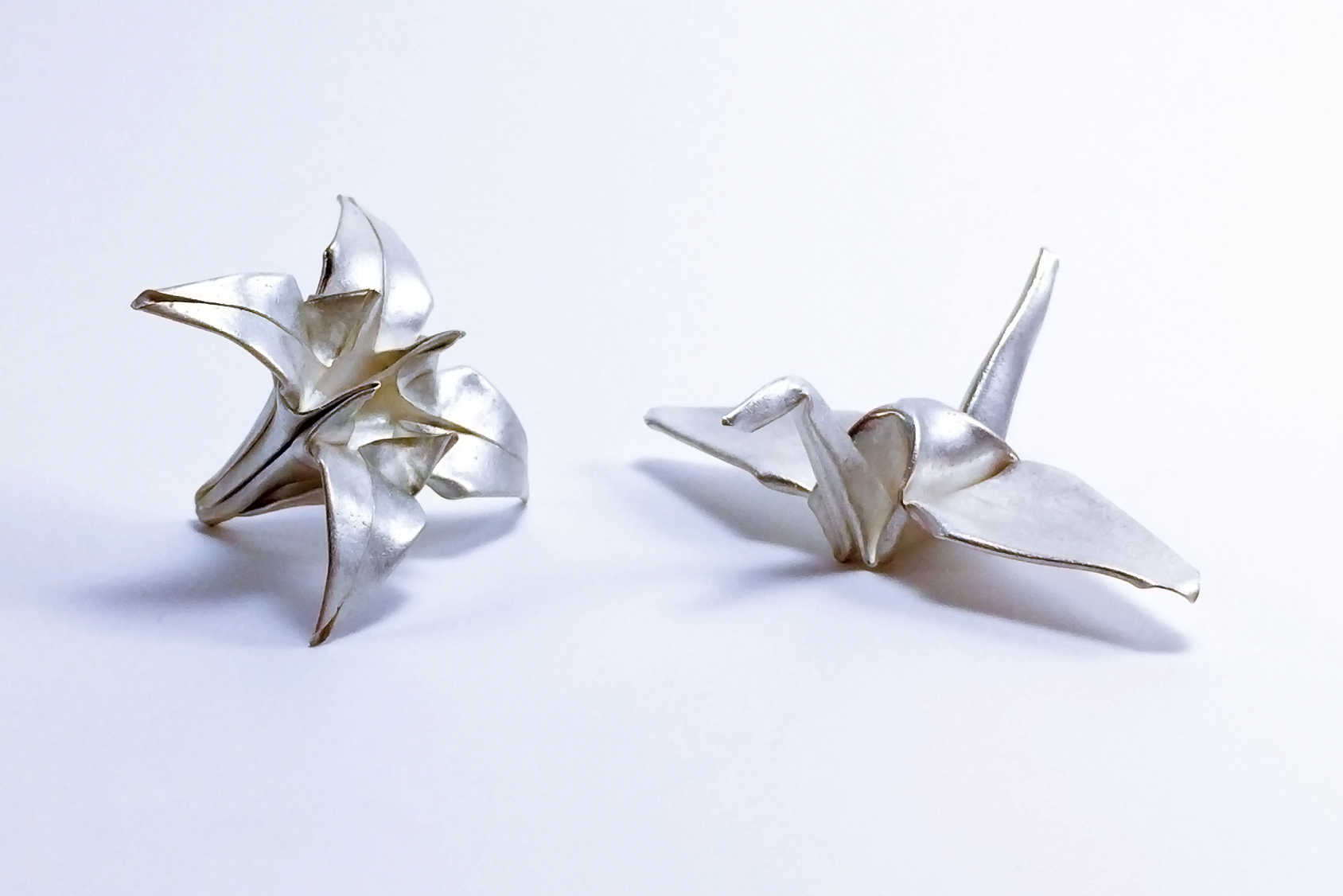
Origami-like silver objects made from metal clay with silver powder

Metal clay is a medium consisting of microscopic particles of metal such as silver, gold, bronze, or copper mixed with an organic binder and water which creates a clay-like material for use in making jewelry, and other small metal objects. Originating in Japan in 1990, metal clay can be shaped like any soft clay, by hand or using molds. After drying, the clay can be carved, sculpted and finished before being fired in a variety of ways such as in a kiln, with a handheld butane torch, or on a gas stove - depending on the metal type contained in the clay. As the dry metal clay fires, binders burn away, and water content evaporates, resulting in sintered metal. Shrinkage of between 8% and 30% occurs (depending on the product used). Alloys such as bronze, sterling silver and steel, as well as pure copper are also available.

== History ==
Metal clay was developed in Japan in 1990 to allow craft jewelry makers in Japan to make sophisticated looking jewelry without the years of study needed to make fine jewelry. It made its way to the United States in the mid-90's, and was introduced by well-known metalsmith, Tim McCreight. In the ensuing years, metal clay has also become a popular addition to the traditional jewelry makers' tool box, thereby making its way into the mainstream.

== Silver metal clay ==
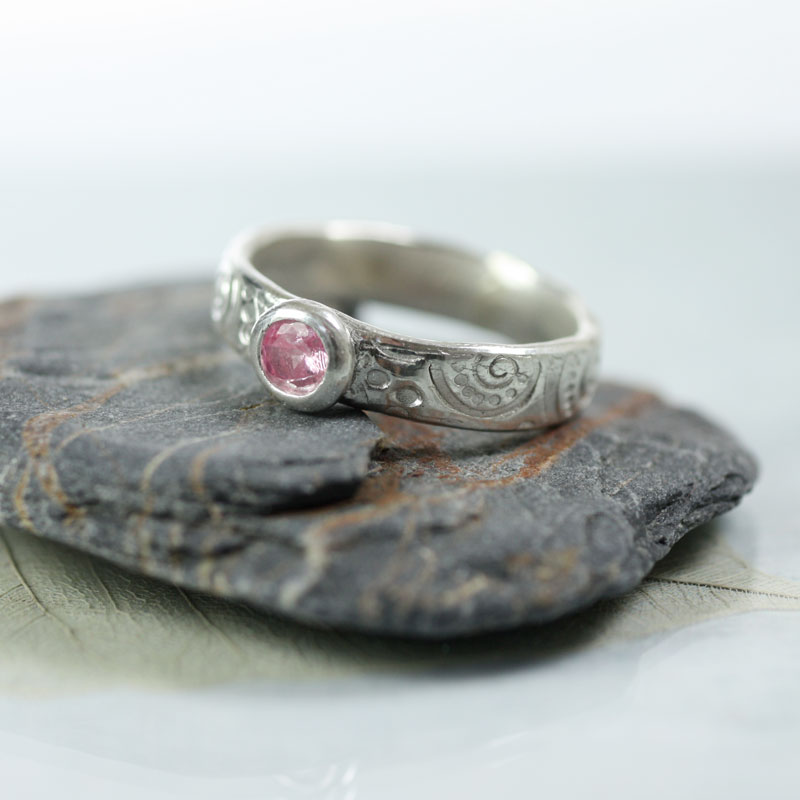
Silver ring made from metal clay with a pink cubic zirconia.

Lump metal clay is sold in sealed packets to keep it moist and workable. Fine silver metal clay results in objects containing 99.9% pure silver, making it suitable for enameling. It is also available in fine gold, 'enriched' sterling (.950 and .960), traditional .925 sterling, copper, bronze, steel, and additional variations. The silver versions are also available as a softer paste in a pre-filled syringe which can be used to produce extruded forms, in small jars of slip and as paper-like sheets, from which most of the moisture has been removed. Gold metal clay is also available in paste form. The oldest brand of silver metal clay currently available is Art Clay Silver (ACS). The newest is Project X by ClayRevolution.com (CR).

An easily fireable sterling alloy, EZ960 Sterling Silver Metal Clay was invented by Bill Struve from Metal Adventures, the inventor of BRONZclay™ and COPPRclay™. Because this clay body (type) is an 'enriched' sterling silver alloy, among its best attributes are its ability to be fired in an 'open' kiln (no carbon needed), and in its post firing strength, in comparison to fine silver. Enriched sterling is fired open shelf on a raised kiln shelf up to 913 °C (1,675 °F) for up to 2 hours, full ramp. Its shrinkage rate can be smaller than other clays, at 10–11%. Note: Each brand and clay type has its own firing schedule and requirements. Differences in firing and shrinkage rates are due to the origin of the metal particles' shape and size, and potentially the binder used. Shrinkage is affected by how the microscopic particles fit together after sintering.

=== Precious Metal Clay (aka PMC) ===
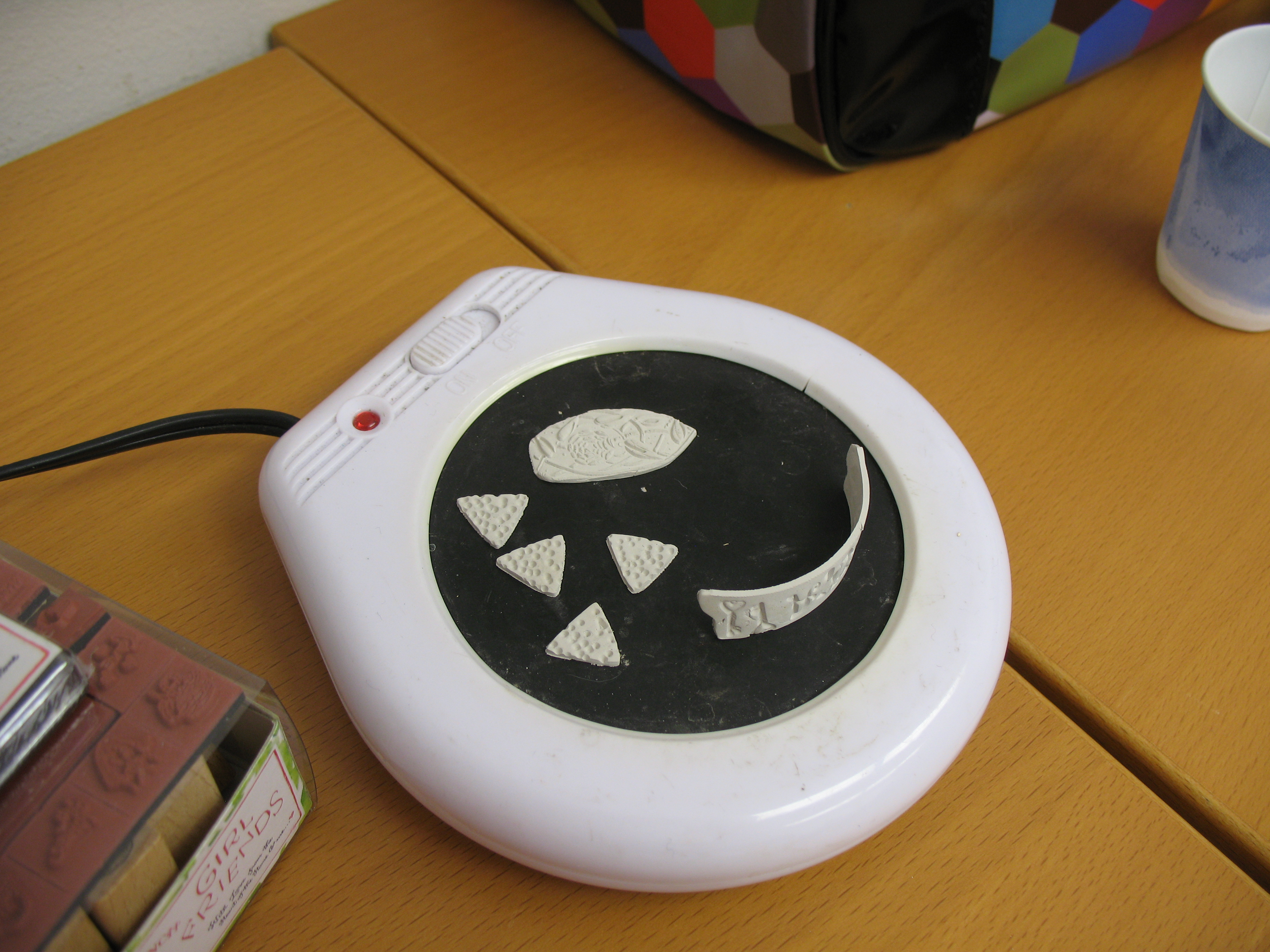
PMC works drying on a mug warmer.

PMC was the brand name of the first metal clay developed in the early 1990s in Japan by metallurgist Masaki Morikawa working for Mitsubishi Materials. As a solid-phase sintered product of a precious metal powder used to form a precious metal article, the material consisted of microscopic particles of pure silver, and a water-soluble, non-toxic, organic binder that burns off during firing. Success was first achieved with 24k gold and later duplicated with .999 silver. The PMC brand included the following products:

- The original formula of PMC, now called "standard": fired at 900 °C (1,650 °F) for 2 hours, shrinks by 30% during firing.
- PMC+ & PMCflex: fired at 900 °C (1,650 °F) for 10 minutes or 800 °C (1,470 °F) for 30 minutes; shrinks 15%, due to a particle size reduction. PMC+ is also available in sheet form which can be worked like paper; for example, for origami.
- PMC3: fired at 599 °C (1,110 °F) for 45 minutes or 699 °C (1,290 °F) for 10 minutes; shrinks by 10%. It can also be fired using a butane torch by heating it to orange heat for at least 2 minutes. It has a longer working life than the older formulations. It is also available in slip and paste forms which can be painted onto the surface of an object to be used as a mold.
- Aura 22: a 22-carat gilding material, a gold paste intended to be painted onto the surface of silver PMC pieces, or ready-made silver objects.
- PMC Pro: a harder product which is only 0.900 fineness silver, hence it cannot be hallmarked as sterling silver. It also requires kiln firing in a tub of activated carbon for 1 hour at 760 °C (1,400 °F).
- PMC Sterling: is fired at 815 °C (1,499 °F) and shrinks by 10–20%. Because of the copper content in this formula, firing is a two-step process; step one is an open-shelf firing and step two requires a firing pan with activated carbon media.

Mitsubishi discontinued all PMC production in 2023.

=== Art Clay Silver (aka ACS) ===
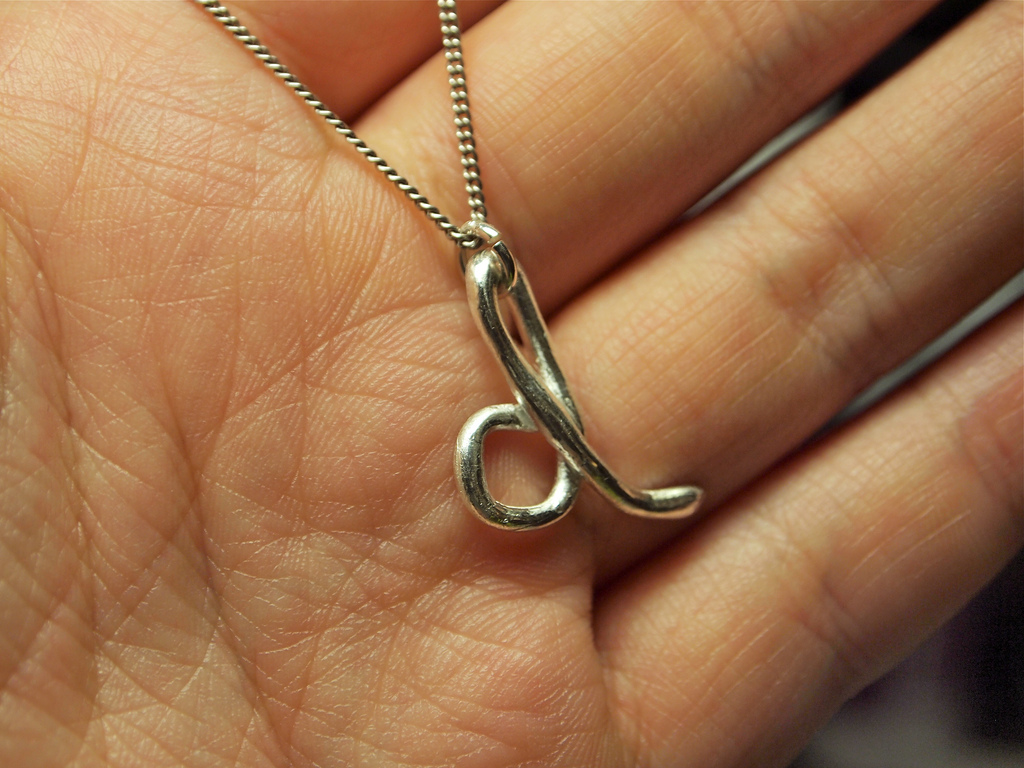
Pendant made from metal clay with gold powder

ACS was developed by AIDA Chemical Industries, also a Japanese company. ACS followed PMC Standard with their Art Clay Original clay which also allows the user to fire with a handheld torch or on a gas hob. Owing to subtle differences in the binder and suggested firing times, this clay shrinks less than the PMC versions, approximately 8–10%.

Further developments introduced the Art Clay Slow Dry, a clay with a longer working time. Art Clay 650 and Art Clay 650 Slow Dry soon followed; both clays can be fired at 650 °C (1,202 °F), allowing the user to combine the clay with glass and sterling silver, which are affected negatively by the higher temperatures needed to fire the first generation clays. AIDA also manufacturers Oil Paste, a product used only on fired metal clay or milled fine silver, and Overlay Paste, which is designed for drawing designs on glass and porcelain.

In 2006 AIDA introduced the Art Clay Gold Paste, a more economical way to work with gold. The paste is painted onto the fired silver clay, then refired in a kiln, or with a torch or gas stove. When fired, it bonds with the silver, giving a 22-carat gold accent. The same year also saw Art Clay Slow Tarnish introduced, a clay that tarnishes less rapidly than the other metal clays.

== Base metal clays ==
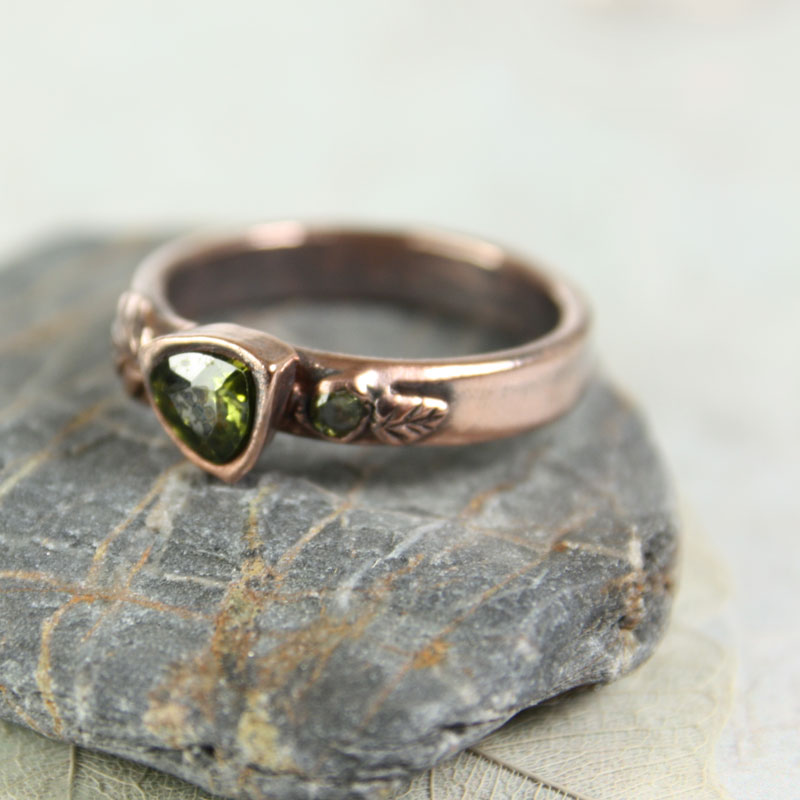
Ring made from copper art clay and set with green cubic zirconias, one a trilliant cut.

Lump metal clay in bronze was first developed by Bill Struve of Metal Adventures Inc. (MA) and introduced in 2008, followed soon after with a lump copper clay version. Due to the lower retail cost of base metal clays, bronze and copper may be used more often than gold and silver metal clay options by artists in the American market place. However, due to the specialized firing requirements of base metal clays, actual creation time is more labor intensive than that of their silver and gold counterparts. Base metal clays, such as bronze, copper, and steel are best fired in the absence of oxygen to eliminate the oxidation of the metal by atmospheric oxygen. A means to accomplish this by submerging the work in activated carbon, placed inside a suitable fire-proof container was discovered and developed by Bill Struve in conjunction with Hadar Jacobson.

== Powders ==
Metal clay powders pre mixed with an organic binder are also available to the retail market to which the end use adds water and blends together create a mass with a clay-like consistency. One advantage to the powders is their unlimited shelf life. The first silver clay in powder form was released in 2006 as Silver Smiths' Metal Clay Powder. In the following years base metal clays by Hadar Jacobson and Goldie World released several variations containing copper, brass, and even steel.

== Firing methods ==
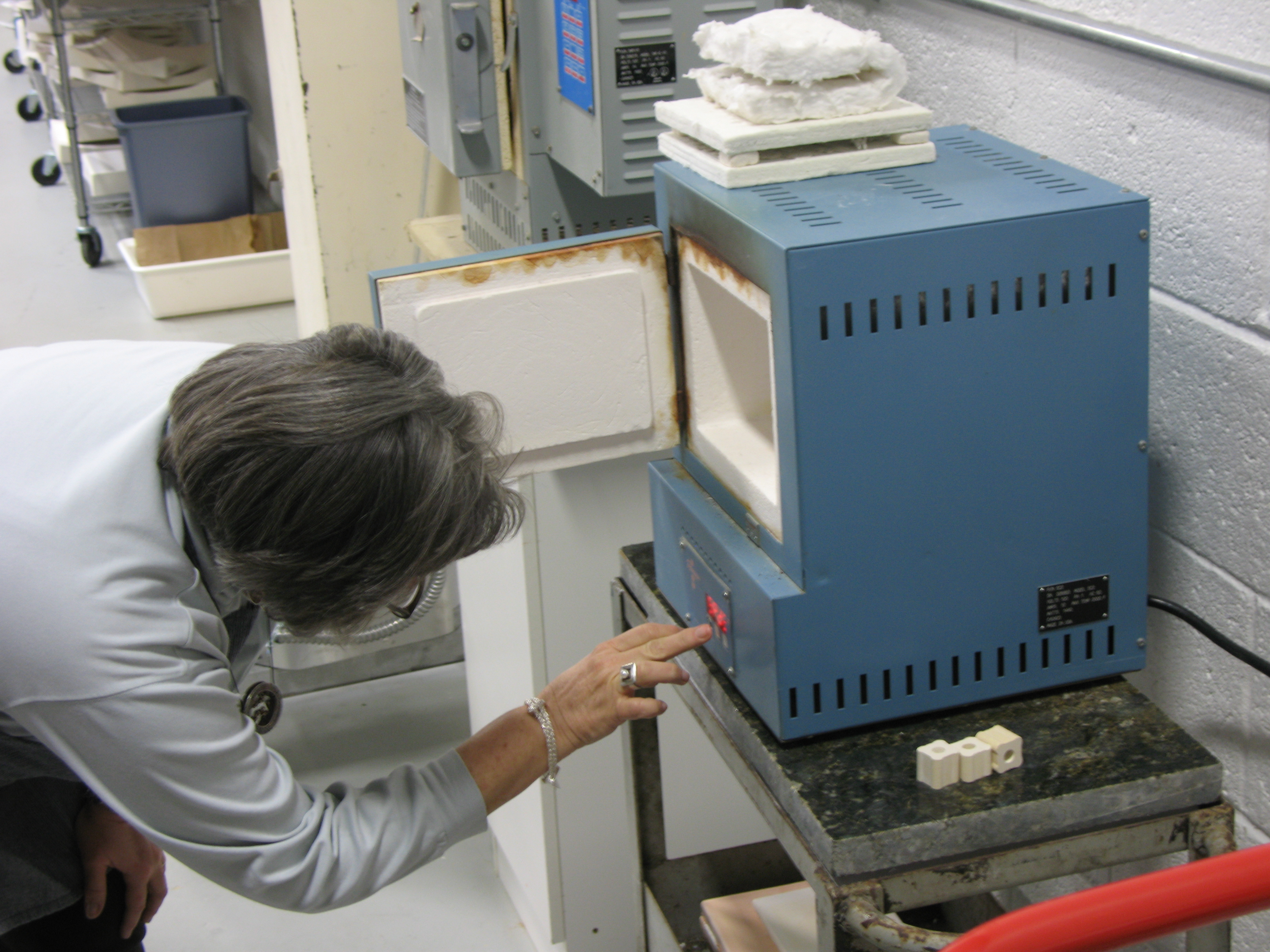
A woman getting an electric kiln ready for PMC firing.

Metal clay can be fired by a variety of methods. The two most common are:

- Electric kiln - Kilns designed for metal clay are programmable and easy to use. All clay types can be fired by this method. This is the only way paper type and base metal clays can be fired.
- Torch - Any type of hand-held torch will work as long as it is hot enough to sinter the metal, but butane is the most common type of gas used for this purpose. The color determines firing time.

Many users also prefer to use a gas stove top/hob. Either natural or bottled gas can be used, provided it reaches the temperature necessary to sinter. The color of the piece determines the firing time.

== See also ==
- Kintsugi – Japanese pottery repair method with gold lacquer
- Sintering - the process of compacting and forming a solid mass of material by pressure or heat without melting it to the point of liquefaction
- Powder metallurgy - The process of sintering metal powders
