= ZYYX =

Swedish desktop 3D printer

ZYYX+ 3D Printer
- Developer: ZYYX Labs AB, Gothenburg, Sweden
- Product family: 3D printer
- Type: Fused filament fabrication
- Generation: second
- Released: 2014
- Introductory price: SEK 17,595
- Media: Simplify3D
- Operating system: Custom Sailfish Open Source FW
- Connectivity: USB, SD card
- Dimensions: 43x54x45.5 cm
- Weight: 19 kg
- Predecessor: ZYYX 3D Printer
- Successor: ZYYX Agile
- Website: Official website

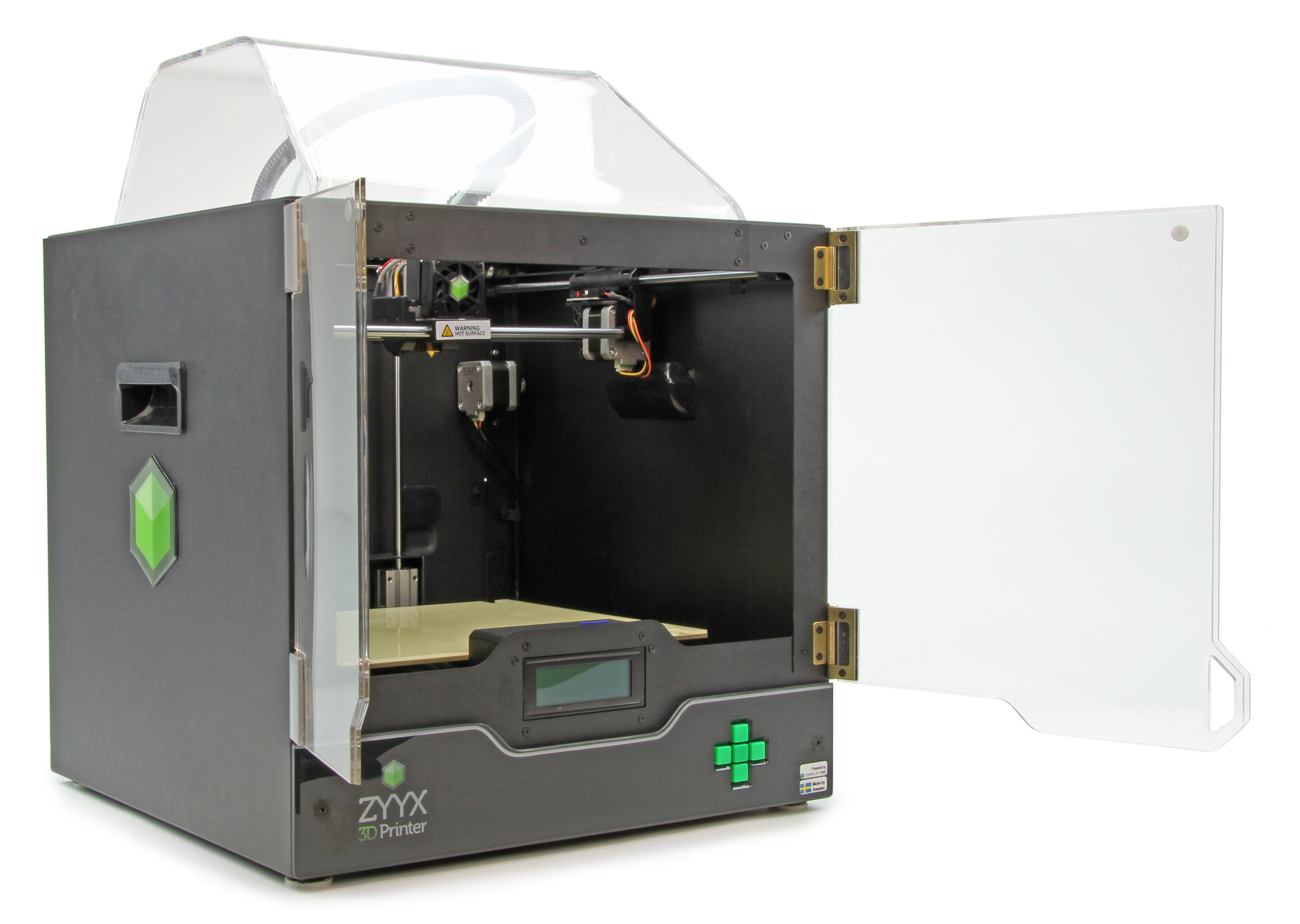
ZYYX 3D printer

ZYYX is a Swedish desktop 3D printer, designed primarily for office and educational applications. Originally launched in 2014 by Magicfirm Europe AB, based at Chalmers Innovation in Gothenburg, the ZYYX 3D Printer is based on FFF technology and features include an automated levelling function, smell-free operation (most 3D printers tend to smell heavily of hot plastic) and an extruder head which is less prone to jamming.

== Models ==
The first model was released in 2014. The ZYYX 3D Printer was designed to provide an enclosed print environment with a fan and carbon filter to scrub fumes produced by the melted filament before exhausting them into the environment. The XYYZ+ Printer was released in 2016 to introduce improvements, that provided a more stable printing environment.

== See also ==
- Digital modeling and fabrication
- List of 3D printer manufacturers
