= Aio (monk) =

English monk

Aio (supposedly died 974) was a fabricated English monk of Crowland Abbey in Lincolnshire and historian. The Oxford Dictionary of National Biography strongly suggests he never existed.
