= Sciaky, Inc. =

American maker of 3D printing systems

Sciaky, Inc. is an American manufacturer of metal 3D printing systems and industrial welding systems, founded in 1939 and headquartered in Chicago, Illinois. It specializes in electron beam welding systems and services for aerospace manufacturers.

In 2009, Sciaky entered the 3D Printing field with its electron beam additive manufacturing (EBAM) process for large metal parts and applications. In 2011, this technology was selected to produce titanium components for the F-35 Fighter Jet and, later, satellite propellant tanks. Sciaky's EBAM systems became available for commercial purchase in September 2014. Sciaky is a subsidiary of manufacturing and repair company Phillips Service Industries, Inc.

== History ==
=== 1930s ===
Sciaky Brothers, Inc. was founded in 1939.

=== 1940s ===
Sciaky was a key supplier of resistance welding systems which were used to make aircraft for the U.S. military during World War II.

=== 1950s ===
Sciaky produced its first Electron Beam (EB) welding system in 1957.

=== 1960s ===
Sciaky was a major supplier of the Electron Beam welding systems used to make Grumman F-14 Tomcat jets in 1969.

=== 1970s ===
DEC PDP and Data General Nova mini-computer based weld control systems introduced.

=== 1980s ===
Data General Eclipse mini-computer based Mark VII weld control system introduced.

Acquired by Allegheny International in 1982.

Dual VME M68000 based W2000 weld control system introduced.

Acquired by Ferranti in 1988.

=== 1990s ===
Phillips Service Industries, Inc. acquired Sciaky in 1994.

=== 2000s ===
Sciaky began research on a new manufacturing process called Electron Beam Free Form Fabrication (EBFFF) in 2000.

Single VME x86 board W20x0 weld control system.

In 2007, Sciaky earns a contract with the National Aeronautics and Space Administration's (NASA) Langley Research Center to create a new EB gun system in the U.S. incorporating the EBFFF system and tested on a microgravity research aircraft and in space. Engineers from NASA assisted in providing supporting hardware to the gun.

In 2009, Sciaky launches its Electron Beam Additive Manufacturing process as a service-only option.

=== 2010s ===
In 2011, Sciaky was selected by the United States Department of Defense (DOD), for the Mentor-Protege Program by Lockheed Martin with the focus of this agreement being the additive manufacturing of titanium structural components for Lockheed Martin's F-35 aircraft program.

In 2012, Sciaky entered a partnership with Penn State University, via DARPA (Defense Advanced Research Projects Agency) funding, to advance Direct Digital Manufacturing technology (DDM) with the goal of advancing and deploying DDM technology for highly engineered and critical metallic systems to the Department of Defense (DOD) and U.S. industry.

In 2014, Sciaky begins selling its EBAM systems on the open market.

As of 2019, the company had four EBAM systems: EBAM 300, 300, 150, and 110.

=== 2020s ===
In 2020, Sciaky announced that it had deposited more than 12,000 lb (5,400 kg) of titanium with its EBAM systems.

== Metal 3D printing system ==
The company’s EBAM process relies on a wire-based directed energy deposition (DED) process. The systems can print parts from 8 inches to 19 feet long and can deposit up to 25 lbs. of metal per hour. The system can be used with titanium, tantalum, tungsten, Inconel, niobium, copper-nickel, aluminum, molybdenum, zirconium alloy, and stainless steel. Sciaky’s EBAM system uses closed-loop real-time adaptive controls that self-adjusts the metal deposition.

== See also ==
- List of 3D printer manufacturers
