= Kikai Labs =

Argentinian manufacturer of 3D printers

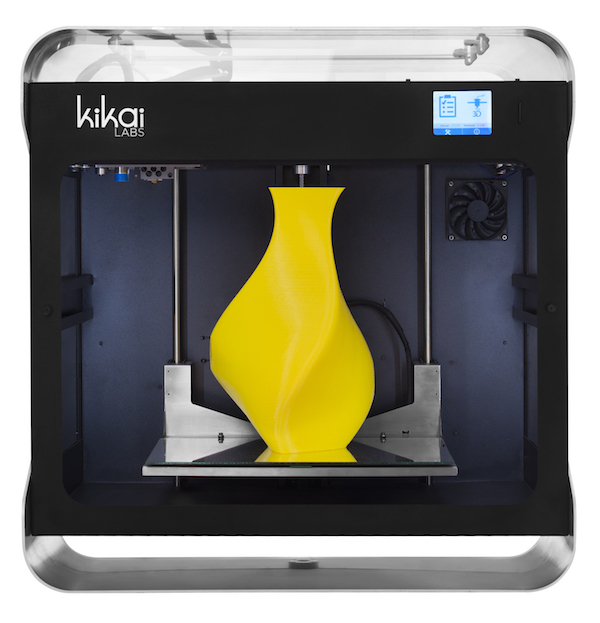
Kikai Labs' Fabber M11 FFF 3D printer

Kikai Labs was an Argentinian Buenos Aires-based company founded by Marcelo Ruiz Camauer that designed and produced several lines and models of 3D printers until late 2016, when it went bankrupt due to lack of available financing for producing its products and government imposed restrictions in imports of essential components.

== Awards ==
The company has received the following awards:

- RioInfo 2012 (Argentina) - Award given as the local winner in the Argentine chapter. The award was a paid trip to compete in the national RioInfo conference in Brazil.
- Semi-finalist in Innovar 2013, 2014, 2015 - This competition, hosted by the Argentine government, showcases inventions and grants monetary prizes. Selected competitors, such as Kikai Labs, are invited to the exhibition.
