= Kudo3d =

American manufacturer of 3D printers

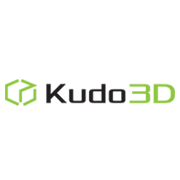
- Industry: 3D printing
- Founded: August 2012
- Founders: Tedd Syao and Jonathan Cheung
- Headquarters: Dublin, California, United States
- Products: Desktop SLA Printer
- Website: www.kudo3d.com

Kudo3D, based in Dublin, California, manufactures professional desktop 3D printers. Its Titan 1 and Titan 2 3D printer use a proprietary passive self-peeling technology, making it one of the leading professional high-resolution stereolithography printers. This technology allows both the Titan 1 and Titan 2 to be used in printing for various applications.

== History ==
In 2012, founder Tedd Syao started creating the Titan 1 and developed the passive self-peeling technology from his garage. Shortly after, Tedd Syao and Jonathan Cheung, both UC Berkeley's Haas School of Business alumni, co-founded Kudo3D.

Kudo3D launched its Kickstarter in May 2014 that was funded within 2 minutes. After its successful campaign and delivery, Kudo3D continued to grow. The company has now expanded to two locations: Pleasanton, California, and Hsinchu, Taiwan.

== Titan 1 ==
The Titan 1 was constructed using modular design, utilizing industrial and consumer-grade components. The printer uses Texas Instrument's DLP technology as its light source and printing time is further reduced as entire layers of resin can be cured at one time. Other components include an industrial grade linear stage module, an open-source controlling circuit, a stepping motor, a fast leveling build platform, and Kudo3D's patented flexible PSP (Passive self-peeling) resin container lined with Teflon to extend container lifetime.

=== Third Party Resin ===
The Titan 1 prints using third party resin. Titan 1 is most compatible with: MakerJuice G+, Spot A's Hard & Tough for High Resolution, Spot A's Flexible Resin, 3D Materials’ Castable and ABS resins.

=== Application ===
The Titan 1's ability to print a wide range of sizes makes it versatile and usable for different applications. The Titan 1 grows extremely high resolutions prints, which is ideal for printing jewelry, miniatures, and research models. The Titan 1 has printed tissue scaffold for the biomedical research department at CCNY that is only 1mm by 2mm. However, it also possesses the ability to print larger items, making the Titan 1 perfect for art, architectural, engineering, and prototyping applications.

== Titan 2 ==
2 years after the successful Kickstarter campaign, Kudo3D released their second generation 3D printer, the Titan 2. The Titan 2 promises a more reliable 3D printer with advanced controls, making it more user-friendly than its predecessor. With a built-in Raspberry Pi and web-based controls, the Titan 2 is compatible with any computer, tablet, or smartphone device.

The Titan 2 incorporates all of the technology from the Titan 1, including the patented PSP resin container. In addition, the Titan 2 comes in 2 different cover colors, the Ruby Red and Green Emerald.

=== Titan 2 HR ===
In November 2016, Kudo3D released a "spin-off" of the Titan 2 3D printer. Named Titan 2 HR, this printer is capable of printing objects at 23 microns XY resolution. This capability makes it especially appealing to people who would like to print high-resolution, fine prints, such as jewelers.

== Bean ==
Marking the third anniversary of the initial Kickstarter launch, Kudo3D launched their new printer once again on Kickstarter. Dubbed the Bean, this compact 3D printer was created to solve the consumer's desire for a high resolution, low cost 3D printer. The Bean was able to reach their goal of $50,000 within 2 minutes and $100,000 in 3 minutes. The Bean 3D printer is a LCD SLA 3D printer, meaning it uses a LCD to project images slices onto the resin container.

Kudo3d offers seven proprietary resins (not compatible with Titan 1 or Titan 2) for the Bean; It can also use third party resins.

== See also ==
- List of 3D printer manufacturers
- 3D Printing
- Stereolithography
