= Vacuum dry box =

Material handling equipment

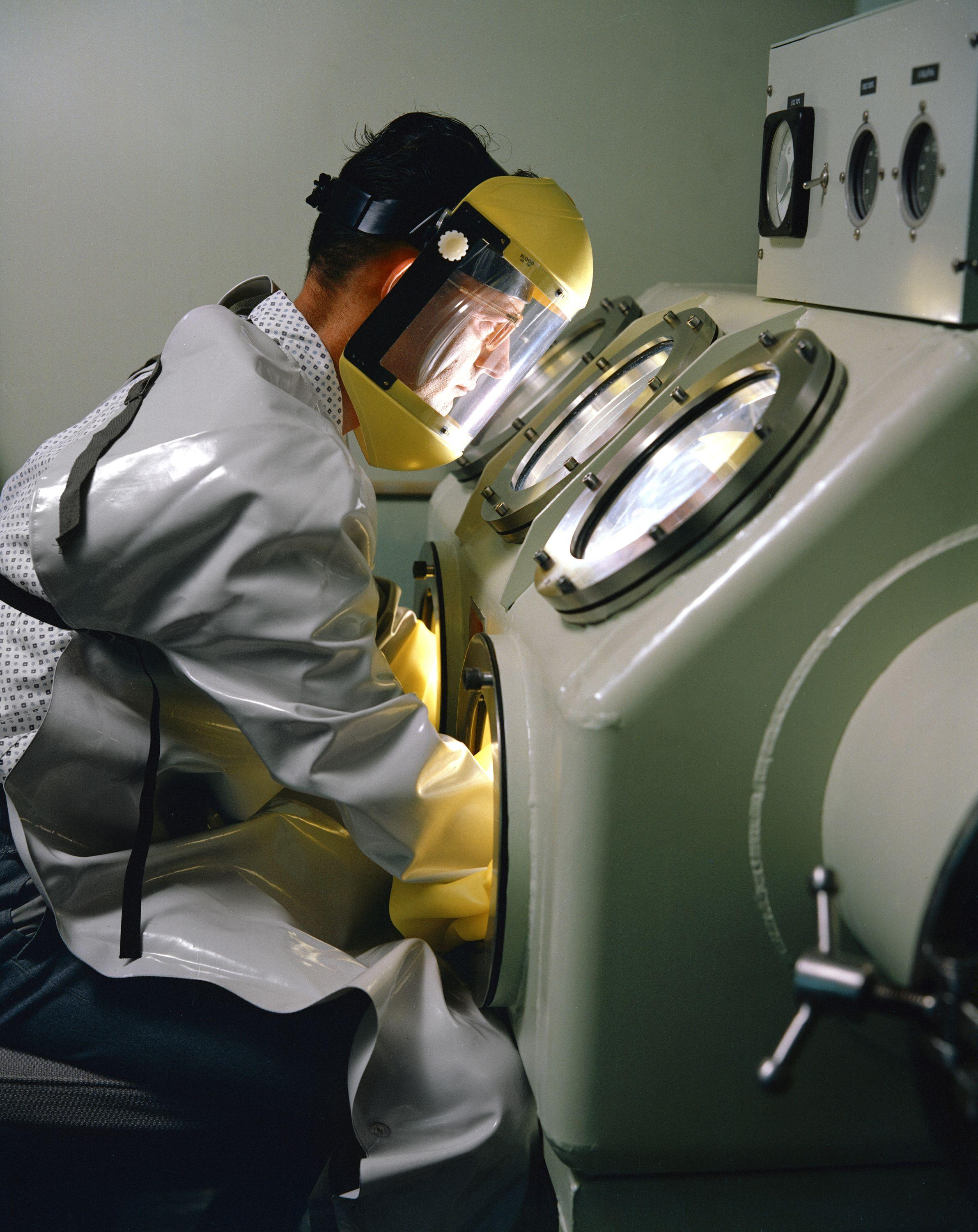
A vacuum dry box and safety equipment.

A vacuum dry box is a piece of safety equipment which can provide an inert, or controlled atmosphere for handling sensitive materials. These devices can commonly be found in the fume hoods of chemistry labs, in facilities handling deadly pathogens, in NASA Moon rock handling facilities and in industrial applications. Inert atmosphere glove boxes are also used for painting and sandblasting.

== See also ==
- Laboratory equipment
- Glovebox
- Dry box
