= Airwolf (disambiguation) =

Airwolf is a 1984 television series that features a high-tech helicopter of the same name.

Airwolf or Air Wolf may also refer to:

- Airwolf (helicopter), the titular helicopter of the TV series
- Airwolf (video game), a video game
- Airwolf 3D, a 3D printer company
