= Marlin (firmware) =

Open source firmware for 3D printers

- Developer: Marlin core team + Marlin community
- Release: December 2011; 14 years ago
- Stable release: 2.1.2.5 / November 19, 2024
- Written in: C++ core
- Operating system: Arduino platform
- Platform: 8-bit AVR and 32-bit ARM based microcontroller units
- Type: 3D printing
- License: GPLv3
- Website: marlinfw.org
- Repository: github.com/MarlinFirmware/Marlin

Marlin is open source firmware originally designed for RepRap project FDM (fused deposition modeling) 3D printers using the Arduino platform.

Marlin supports many different types of 3D printing robot platforms, including basic Cartesian, Core XY, Delta, and SCARA printers, as well as some other less conventional designs like Hangprinter and Beltprinter. In addition to 3D printers, Marlin is generally adaptable to any machine requiring control and interaction. It has been used to drive SLA and SLS 3D printers, custom CNC mills, laser engravers (or laser beam machining), laser cutters, vinyl cutters, pick-and-place machines, foam cutters, and egg painting robots.

== History ==
Marlin was first created in 2011 for the RepRap and Ultimaker printers by combining elements from the open source Grbl and Sprinter projects. Development continued at a slow pace while gaining in popularity and acceptance as a superior alternative to the other available firmware. By 2015, companies were beginning to introduce commercial 3D printers with Marlin pre-installed and contributing their improvements to the project. Early machines included the Ultimaker 1, the TAZ series by Aleph Objects and the Prusa i3 by Prusa Research.

By 2018 manufacturers had begun to favor boards with more powerful and efficient ARM processors, often at a lower cost than the AVR boards they supplant. After extensive refactoring Marlin 2.0 was officially released in late 2019 with full support for 32-bit ARM-based controller boards through a lightweight extensible hardware access layer. While Marlin 1.x had only supported 8-bit AVR (e.g., ATMega) and ATSAM3X8E (Due) platforms, the HAL added ATSAMD51 (Grand Central), Espressif ESP32, NXP LPC176x, and STMicro STM32. Marlin also acquired HAL code to run natively on Linux, Mac, and Windows, but only within a simulation for debugging purposes.

As of October 2022, Marlin was still under active development and continues to be very popular, claiming to be "the most widely used 3D printing firmware in the world." Some of the most successful companies using Marlin today are Ultimaker, LulzBot, Prusa Research, and Creality.

Marlin firmware is not alone in the field of open source 3D printer firmware. Other popular open source firmware offerings include RepRap Firmware by Duet3D, Buddy Firmware by Prusa Research, and Klipper by the Klipper Foundation. These alternatives take advantage of extra processing power to offer advanced features like input shaping, which has only recently been added to Marlin (only limited version; Marlin does not support hardware accelerometers which is the best way to fully take advantage of input shaping).

== Technical ==
Marlin firmware is hosted on GitHub, where it is developed and maintained by a community of contributors. Marlin's lead developer is Scott Lahteine (aka Thinkyhead), an independent shareware and former Amiga game developer who joined the project in 2014. His work is entirely supported by crowdfunding.

Marlin is written in optimized C++ for the Arduino API in a mostly embedded-C++ style, which avoids the use of dynamic memory allocation. The firmware can be built with Arduino IDE, PlatformIO, or Auto Build Marlin extension for Visual Studio Code. The latter method is recommended because it is very easy but it only being a Visual Studio Code extension requires Visual Studio Code to be installed on the building system first.

Once the firmware has been compiled from C++ source code; it is installed and runs on a mainboard with onboard components and general-purpose I/O pins to control and communicate with other components. For control the firmware receives input from a USB port or attached media in the form of G-code commands instructing the machine what to do. For example, the command "G1 X10" tells the machine to perform a smooth linear move of the X axis to position 10. The main loop manages all of the machine's real-time activities like commanding the stepper motors through stepper drivers, controlling heaters, sensors, and lights, managing the display and user interface, etc.

== License ==
Marlin is distributed under the GPL license which requires that organizations and individuals share their source code if they distribute the firmware in binary form, including firmware that comes pre-installed on the mainboard. Vendors have occasionally failed to comply with the license, leading to some distributors dropping their products.

In 2018 the US distributor Printed Solid ended its relationship with Creality due to GPL violations and quality issues.

As of 2022, some vendors are still spotty in their compliance, deflecting customer requests for the source code for an extended period or in perpetuity after a product release.

== Usage and license compliance ==
Marlin firmware is used by several 3D printer manufacturers, most of which are fully compliant with the license. Compliance is tracked by Tim Hoogland of TH3D Studio, et al.. The following table may be out of date by the time you read this.

Company	GPL compliance
Aleph Objects' Lulzbot printers	Yes
Anet	
Artillery 3D	Yes
AnyCubic	Yes
Alphawise	Yes
Bibo	
BQ	
BCN3D	Yes
BCN3D	Yes
BIQU/BTT	Yes
Creality	No: CR-X Yes: CR-10S and Ender3
FLSun	Yes
FolgerTech	
Geeetech	Yes
JGAurora	No: A8, A7, Z-603S Yes: A1, A5S, A3S, A5
Ideaformer	No
LMYSTAR	No
Makerbase	Yes
Mingda	No
Printrbot	Yes
Prusa Research	Yes, and they base their custom firmware on Marlin
Sunlu	No
Tevo	No
TronXY	No
Ultimaker	Yes
Wanhao	Yes
Zonestar	Yes

== See also ==
- RepRap Project
- G-code
- RAMPS
- 3D printing
- Applications of 3D printing
- List of 3D printer manufacturers
- List of 3D printing software
- 3D printing processes
- 3D Manufacturing Format
- 3D printing speed
- Fused filament fabrication
- Construction 3D printing
