= Dry box =

A dry box is a storage container in which the interior is kept at a low level of humidity. It may be as simple as an airtight and watertight enclosure, or it may use active means to remove water vapor from the air trapped inside.

Dry boxes are used to safely store items that would otherwise be damaged or adversely affected by excessive humidity, such as cameras and lenses (to prevent fungal growth), 3D printing filament (to prevent moisture-caused damage such as popping and sizzling when passing through the hotend and turning into steam; moisture-soaked filament also becomes brittle or soft), and musical instruments (to prevent humidity-induced swelling or shrinkage of wooden instrument parts). They are also used in the storage of surface mount electronic components prior to circuit board assembly, to prevent water absorption that could flash into steam during reflow soldering, destroying the part.

== Types ==
=== Desiccant boxes ===
A simple dry box can consist of nothing more than a sealed, airtight box containing a desiccant, such as silica gel or anhydrous calcium chloride. These can be easily built at relatively low cost. However, the humidity level in such boxes cannot be controlled or regulated, owing to the difficulty of gauging the quantity of desiccant required to achieve a certain humidity level. Repeated opening of such boxes, allowing humid ambient air to enter, can saturate the desiccant, and some desiccants can have corrosive or other harmful effects on the contents of the box if they collect enough water to dissolve.

=== Electronic dry boxes ===
Electronic dry boxes contain a small Peltier cooler, which removes moisture from the air by condensing it out. A control dial is usually provided that permits the user rough adjustment of the humidity level. More sophisticated designs link the cooler to a settable digital hygrometer, allowing very precise humidity level control.

Another form of electronic dry box technology utilizes multi-porous molecular sieve desiccants to absorb moisture. This moisture and humidity control technology is renewable without having to replace desiccant and is capable of reaching low humidity (20%RH or less) to ultra low humidity (5%RH or less) levels. Generally dry boxes with 5%RH or less is utilized in surface mount technology in order to comply with IPC/JEDEC J-STD-033. Desiccants have advantages over Peltier coolers in lower ambient temperatures.

=== Nitrogen Dry Cabinets ===
A nitrogen dry cabinet (also known as a nitrogen dry box or nitrogen storage cabinet) is a sealed storage enclosure that maintains a low-humidity internal environment by purging the interior with nitrogen gas. These cabinets are primarily used in electronics manufacturing to store moisture-sensitive devices (MSDs) such as surface-mount components, printed circuit boards, and semiconductor packages.

Moisture-sensitive components can absorb ambient humidity, which may cause defects such as "popcorning" — internal cracking or delamination that occurs when trapped moisture rapidly vaporizes during reflow soldering. Industry standards IPC/JEDEC J-STD-033 define handling, packing, and storage requirements for such components, including permissible floor life and storage conditions, typically below 5% relative humidity for extended storage.

Nitrogen dry cabinets displace humid air with dry nitrogen gas, often maintaining relative humidity levels between 1% and 5%. Some designs combine nitrogen purging with desiccant-based or electronic dehumidification systems. Beyond electronics, they are also used to store optical instruments, camera equipment, laboratory reagents, museum artifacts, and other items sensitive to humidity or oxidation, since the nitrogen atmosphere also reduces oxidation of exposed metal surfaces such as solder pads.

== See also ==
- Molecular sieve
- Desiccant
- Glovebox

== Sources ==
- https://www.eurekadrytech.com/how-does-eurekas-auto-dry-box-work
- https://www.eurekadrytech.com/application/humidity-controlled-3d-printing-filament-storage-dry-cabinet
- Frequently Asked Questions about Dry Box Cabinets
- https://web.archive.org/web/20150513114432/http://www.jedec.org/sites/default/files/docs/jstd033b01.pdf
- https://smtdryboxes.com/dry-cabinets-the-complete-buyers-guide/
- https://smtdryboxes.com/nitrogen-dry-cabinets/
