= Fused filament fabrication =

3D printing process that melts thermoplastic material from a spool of filament

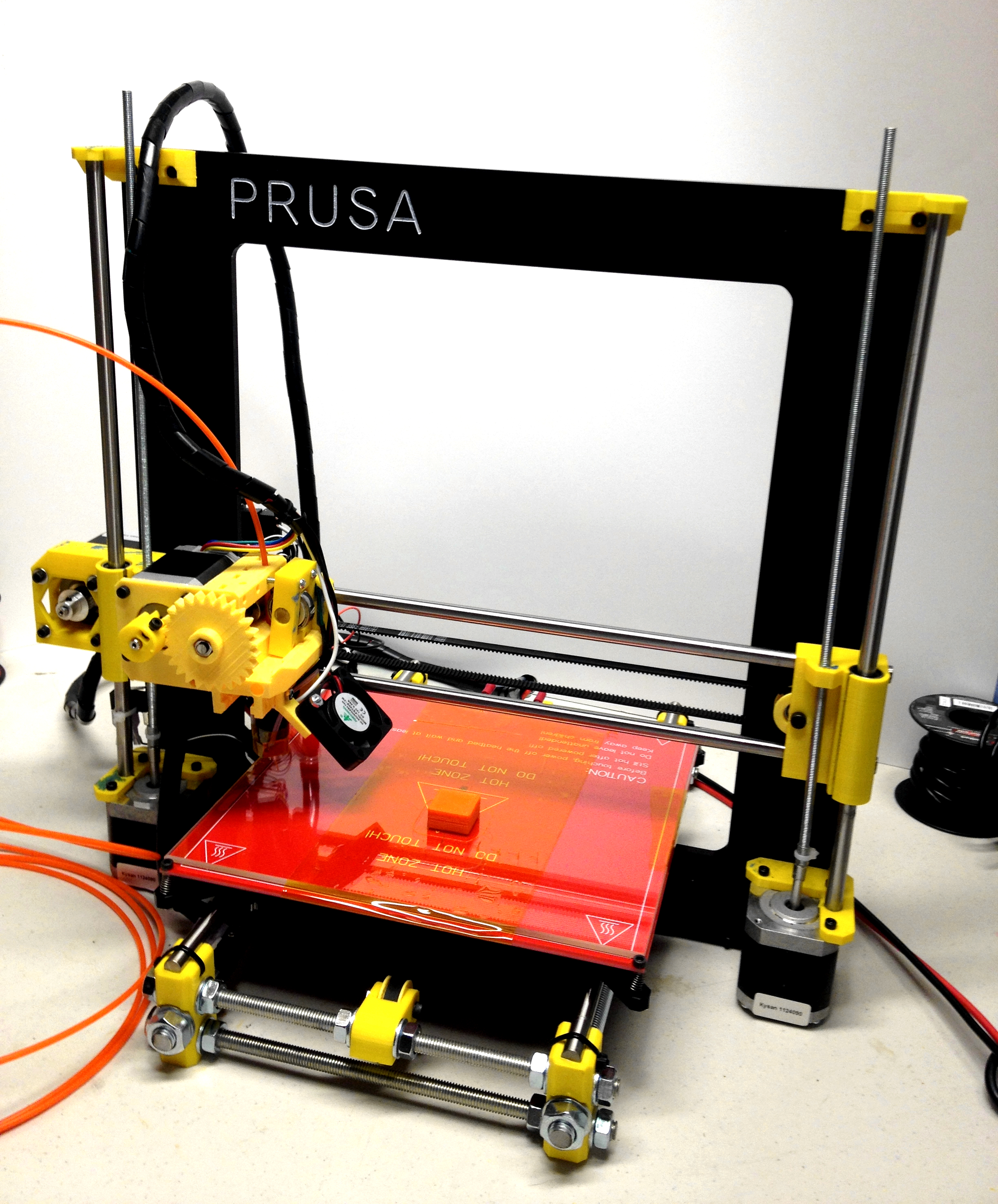
Prusa i3, a simple fused filament printer

Fused filament fabrication (FFF), also known as fused deposition modeling (with the trademarked acronym FDM), or filament freeform fabrication, is a 3D printing process that uses a continuous filament of a thermoplastic material. Filament is fed from a large spool through a moving, heated printer extruder head, and is deposited on the growing work. The toolhead, also known as printhead with the heated nozzle is controlled by a computer executing g-code files that are generated by a slicer which generates movements to match a 3D file. In one common design, the toolhead moves in two dimensions to deposit one horizontal plane, or layer, at a time; the work or the print head is then moved vertically by a small amount to begin a new layer. "Fused filament fabrication" was coined by the members of the RepRap project to give an acronym (FFF) that would be legally unconstrained in use.

Fused filament printing has in the 2010s–2020s been the most popular process (by number of machines) for hobbyist-grade 3D printing because of its relatively low cost and ease of use. Other techniques such as photopolymerisation and powder sintering may offer better results, but they are much more costly.

Illustration of a toolhead with a hotend, direct drive extruder and its parts.

The 3D printer head or 3D printer extruder is a part in material extrusion additive manufacturing responsible for raw material melting or softening and forming it into a continuous profile. A wide variety of filament materials are extruded, including thermoplastics such as acrylonitrile butadiene styrene (ABS), polylactic acid (PLA), polyethylene terephthalate glycol (PETG), polyethylene terephthalate (PET), high-impact polystyrene (HIPS), thermoplastic polyurethane (TPU) and aliphatic polyamides (nylon), and acrylonitrile styrene acrylate (ASA).

== History and spread ==
A timelapse of the Bambu Lab P1S—a modern 3D printer—printing a dragon.

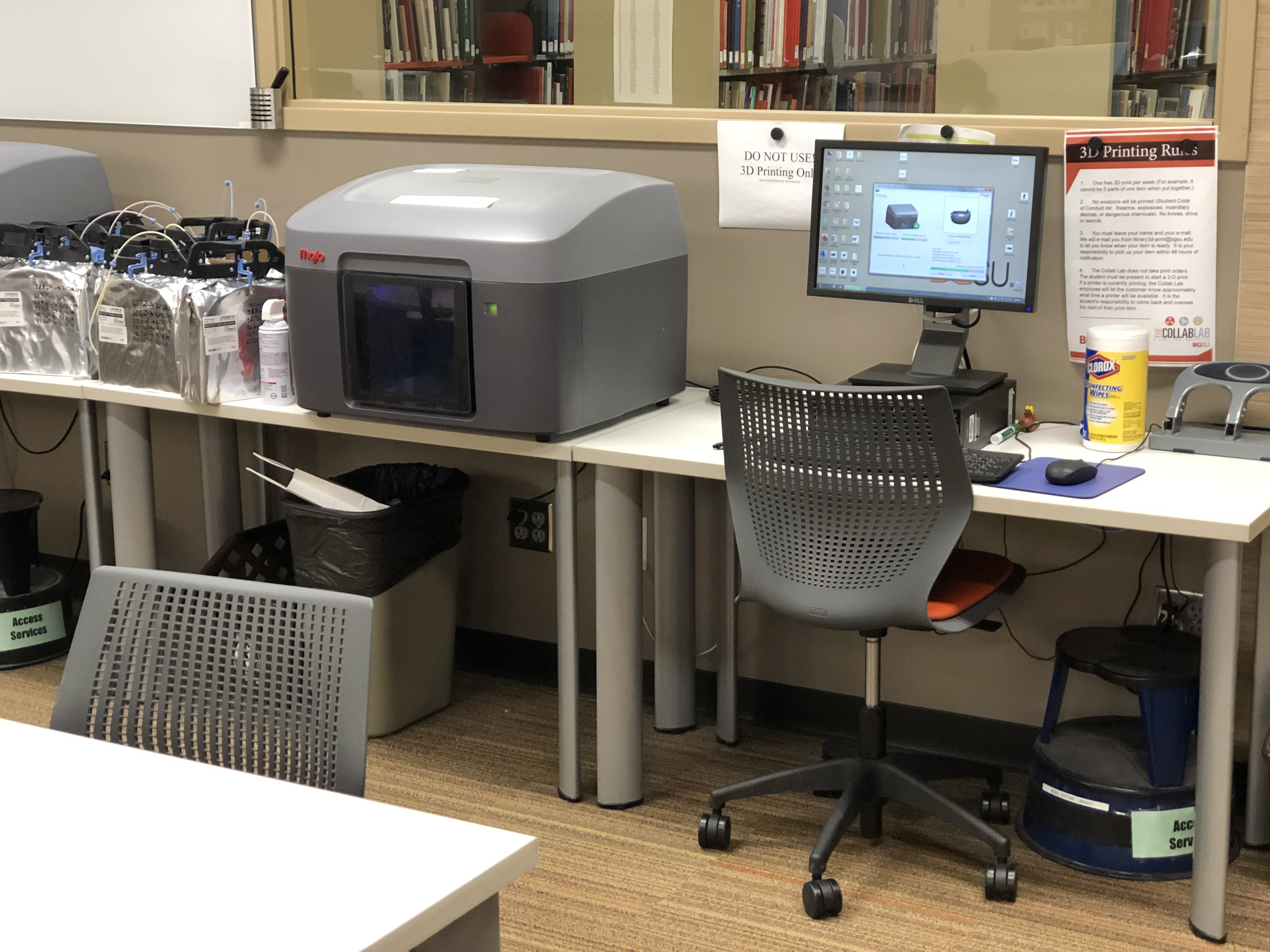
A desktop FFF printer made by Stratasys.

Fused deposition modeling was developed by S. Scott Crump, co-founder of Stratasys, in 1988.

The patent on FDM technology expired in 2009, so people could use this type of printing without asking or paying Stratasys for the right to do so. Soon after, a large industry of commercial FFF-based 3D printers could flourish. Additionally, there would be a litany of DIY and open-source 3D printer designs popular with amateurs and institutions, including designs produced by RepRap. The expiry of the patent has been credited for enabling a two-orders-of-magnitude price drop since this technology's creation.

As with Chevron's Techron, Stratasys still owns the trademark on the term "FDM," leading to the adoption of the alternative name FFF by RepRap and others.

== Process ==
3D printing, also referred to as additive manufacturing (AM), involves manufacturing a part by depositing material layer by layer. There is a wide array of different AM technologies that can do this, including material extrusion, binder jetting, material jetting and directed energy deposition. These processes have varied types of extruders and extrude different materials to achieve the final product.

=== Material extrusion ===
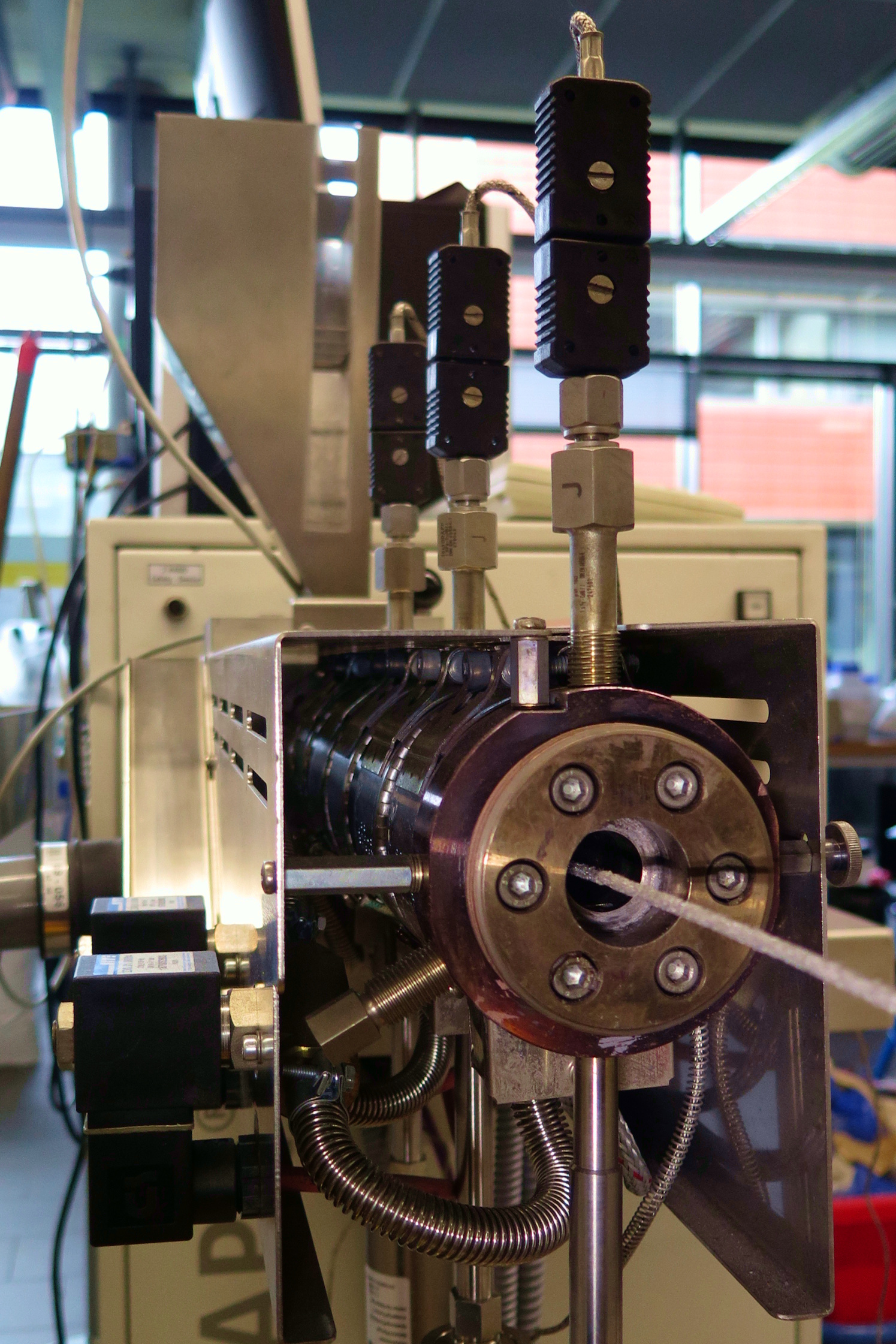
Filament production with extruder

Diagram of a direct drive extruder.

Fused filament fabrication uses material extrusion to print items, where a feedstock material is pushed through an extruder. In most fused filament fabrication 3D printing machines, the feedstock material comes in the form of a filament wound onto a spool.

The 3D printer liquefier is the component predominantly used in this type of printing. Extruders for these printers have a cold end and a hot end. The cold end pulls material from the spool, using gear- or roller-based torque to the material and controlling the feed rate by means of a stepper motor. The cold end pushes feedstock into the hot end. The hot end consists of a heating chamber and a nozzle. The heating chamber hosts the liquefier, which melts the feedstock to transform it into a liquid. It allows the molten material to exit from the small nozzle to form a thin, tacky bead of plastic that will adhere to the material it is laid on. The nozzle will usually have a diameter of between 0.2 mm and 1.0 mm.

Different types of nozzles and heating methods are used depending upon the material to be printed. Brass nozzles are sufficient for soft plastics like PLA, while hardened steel nozzles are needed for more abrasive and tougher materials or plastics with additives (like for example PLA with added wood or carbon fiber). Different types of nozzles have different ways of replacing them. The most common used nozzles are the V6 nozzles made popular by E3D and MK8 nozzles, which both have standard M6×1 metric threads. Changing the nozzle must be done while hot, to avoid plastic leaks.

After printing is completed the model may require post-processing which can include removal of support material and brims, as well as final touches to the appearance of the object which might involve sanding or vapor-smoothing using solvents such as acetone. Depending on the material used and the intended purpose of the print an additional step such as annealing might be used to improve the strength and heat resistance.

==== Variants of the process ====
- Hot extrusion of rods - In these types of 3d printing machines, the feedstock is in form of a rod instead of a filament. Since the rod is thicker than the filament, it can be pushed towards the hot end by means of a piston or rollers, applying a greater force and/or velocity compared to conventional FFF.
- Cold extrusion of slurries - In these types of 3D printing machines, the feedstock comes in form of a slurry, a paste or a clay—all of which are viscous suspension of solid powder particles in a liquid medium, which is dried after deposition. In this case, the material is generally pushed towards the nozzle by the action of a piston, and the nozzle is not heated. Paste-like materials such as ceramics and chocolate can be extruded using the fused filament process and a specialized paste extruder.
- Hot extrusion of pellets - In these types of 3d printing machines the feedstock comes in form of pellets, i.e. small granules of thermoplastic material or mixtures of thermoplastic binder with powder fillers. The material is pushed towards the nozzle by the action of a piston or a rotating screw, which are contained by an extrusion barrel. In this case the whole extrusion barrel is heated, along with the nozzle. The adhesion strength of the layers of the parts depend on the printing temperature and other printing parameter.

The nozzle can be moved in both horizontal and vertical directions, and is mounted to a mechanical stage, which can be moved in the xy plane.

Process: 1 – 3D printer extruder, 2 – deposited material (modeled part), 3 – controlled movable table

As the nozzle is moved over the table in a prescribed geometry, it deposits a thin bead of extruded plastic, called a road which solidifies quickly upon contact with the substrate and/or roads deposited earlier. Solid layers are generated by following a rasterizing motion where the roads are deposited side by side within an enveloping domain boundary.

Stepper motors or servo motors are typically employed to move the extrusion head. The mechanism used is often an X-Y-Z rectilinear design, although other mechanical designs such as deltabot have been employed.

Once a layer is completed, the platform is lowered (or the extruder is raised) in the z direction in order to start the next layer. This process continues until the fabrication of the object is completed.

For successful bonding of the roads in the process, thermal control of the deposited material is necessary. The system can be kept inside a chamber, maintained at a temperature below the melting point of the material being deposited.

Although as a printing technology FFF is very flexible, and it is capable of dealing with small overhangs by the support from lower layers, FFF generally has some restrictions on the slope of the overhang, and cannot produce unsupported stalactites.

Myriad materials are available, such as acrylonitrile butadiene styrene (ABS), polylactic acid (PLA), polycarbonate (PC), polyamide (PA), polystyrene (PS), lignin, rubber, among many others, with different trade-offs between strength and temperature properties. In addition, even the color of a given thermoplastic material may affect the strength of the printed object.

During FFF, the hot molten polymer is exposed to air. Operating the FFF process within an inert gas atmosphere such as nitrogen or argon can significantly increase the layer adhesion and leads to improved mechanical properties of the 3D printed objects. An inert gas is routinely used to prevent oxidation during selective laser sintering.

==== Physics of the process ====
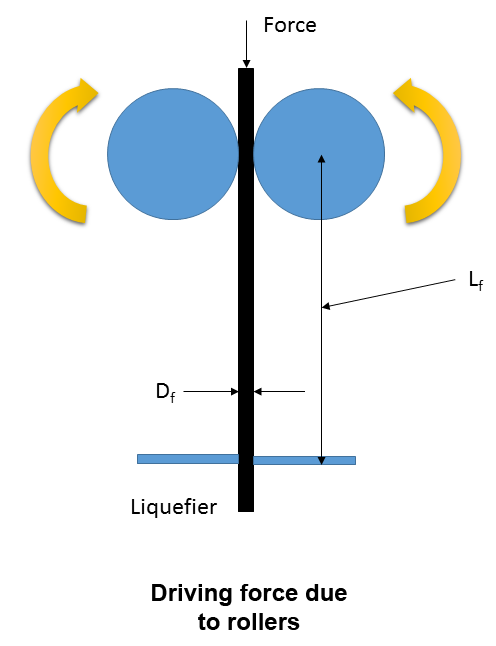
3D printer extruder's driving force, where D_{f} is diameter of filament and L_{f} is length of filament

During extrusion the thermoplastic filament is introduced by mechanical pressure from rollers, into the liquefier (or hotend), where it melts and is then extruded. Flow geometry of the extruder, heating method and the melt flow behavior of a non-Newtonian fluid are of main consideration in the part. The rollers are the only drive mechanism in the material delivery system, therefore filament is under tensile stress upstream to the roller and under compression at the downstream side acting as a plunger. Therefore, compressive stress is the driving force behind the extrusion process.

The force required to extrude the melt must be sufficient to overcome the pressure drop across the system, which strictly depends on the viscous properties of the melted material and the flow geometry of the liquefier and nozzle. The melted material is subjected to shear deformation during the flow. Shear thinning behavior is observed in most of the materials used in this type of 3-D printing. This is modeled using power law for generalized Newtonian fluids.

The temperature is regulated by heat input from electrical coil heaters. The system continuously adjusts the power supplied to the coils according to the temperature difference between the desired value and the value detected by the thermocouple, forming a negative feedback loop. This is similar to ambient heating of a room.

== Applications ==
=== Commercial applications ===
FFF and the other technologies of additive manufacturing by material extrusion (EAM) techniques are commonly used for prototyping and rapid manufacturing. Rapid prototyping facilitates iterative testing, and for very short runs, rapid manufacturing can be a relatively inexpensive alternative. EAM is also used in prototyping scaffolds for medical tissue engineering applications. Moreover, EAM with multi extrusion have become very popular to fabricate biomimetic composites. FFF is also applied in manufacturing within other sectors, including aerospace, automotive, construction, electronics, energy, pharmaceuticals, sports, textiles, and toys.

=== Free applications ===
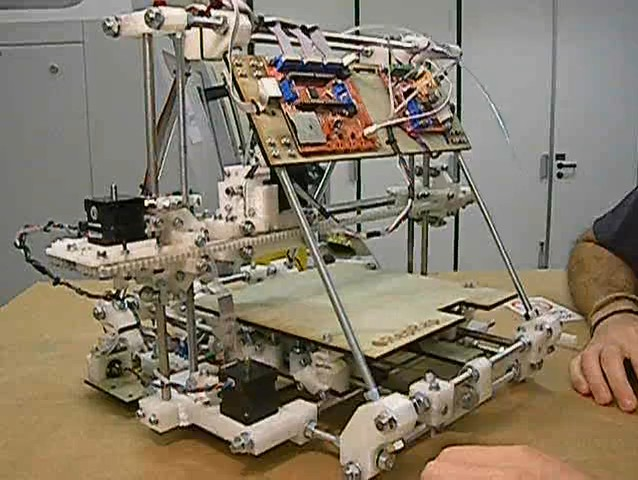
RepRap version 2.0 (Mendel)

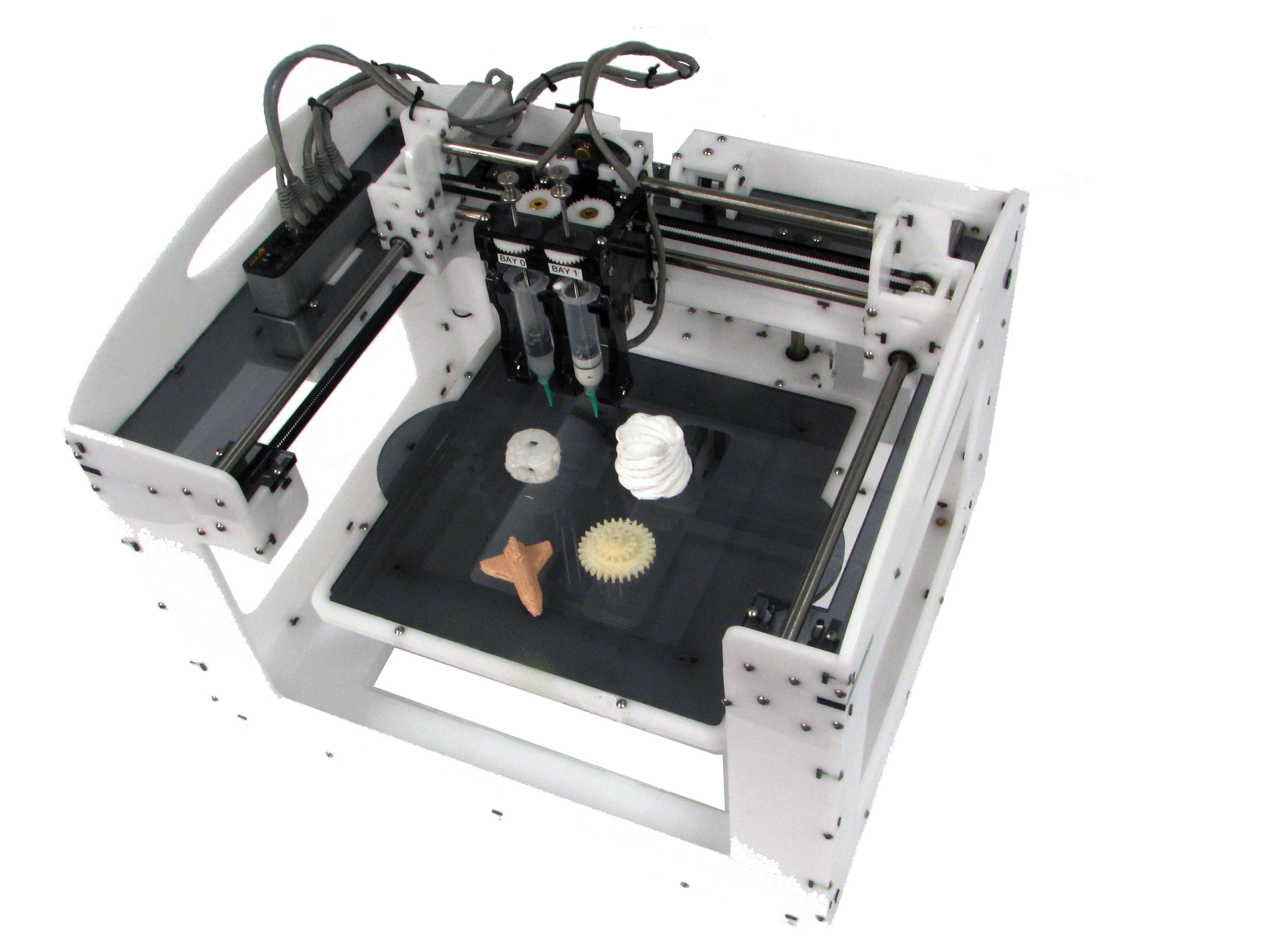
Fab@Home Model 2 (2009)

Printing in progress in an Ultimaker 3D printer during Mozilla Maker party, Bangalore

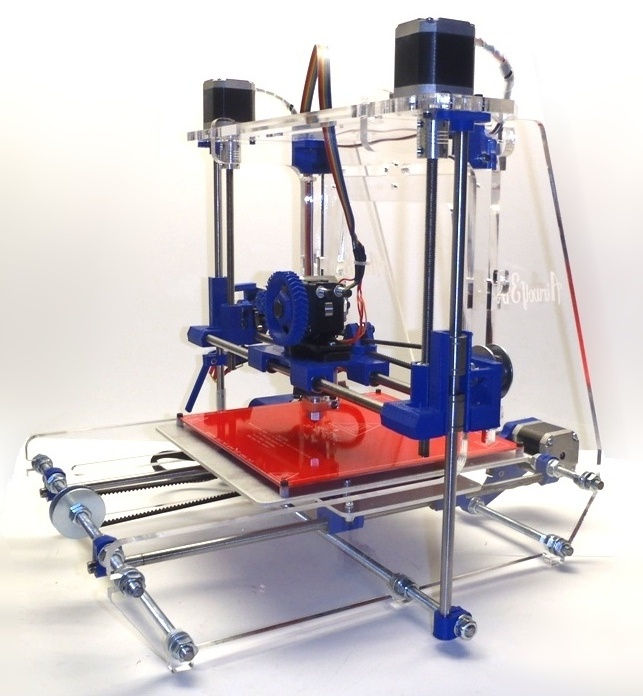
Airwolf 3D AW3D v.4 (Prusa)

There are multiple projects in the open-sourced community aimed at processing post-consumer plastic waste into filament. These involve machines used to shred and extrude the plastic material into filament such as recyclebots.

Several projects and companies are making efforts to develop affordable 3D printers for home desktop use. Much of this work has been driven by and targeted at DIY/enthusiast/early adopter communities, with additional ties to the academic and hacker communities.

RepRap is one of the longest running projects in the desktop category. The RepRap project aims to produce a free and open source hardware (FOSH) 3D printer, whose full specifications are released under the GNU General Public License, and which is capable of replicating itself by printing many of its own (plastic) parts to create more machines. RepRaps have already been shown to be able to print circuit boards and metal parts. Fab@Home is the other opensource hardware project for DIY 3D printers.

Because of the FOSH aims of RepRap, many related projects have used their design for inspiration, creating an ecosystem of related or derivative 3D printers, most of which are also open source designs. The availability of these open source designs means that variants of 3D printers are easy to invent. The quality and complexity of printer designs, however, as well as the quality of kit or finished products, varies greatly from project to project. This rapid development of open source 3D printers is gaining interest in many spheres as it enables hyper-customization and the use of public domain designs to fabricate open source appropriate technology. This technology can also assist initiatives in sustainable development since technologies are easily and economically made from resources available to local communities.

==== Development ====
Customer-driven product customization and demand for cost and time savings have increased interest in agility of manufacturing process. This has led to improvements in rapid prototyping technologies. The development of extruders is going rapidly because of the open source 3-D printer movement caused by products like RepRap. E3D and BondTech are the most known extruder manufacturers currently on the market. Consistent improvements are seen in the form of increased heating temperature of liquefiers, better control and precision of prints, and improved support for a wide variety of materials. Besides the improved hardware, the ability to calibrate the extruder according to the hardware setup has come a long way.

==== Cost of 3D printer ====
The cost of 3D printers has decreased dramatically since about 2010, with machines that used to cost US$20,000 now costing less than US$1,000. For instance, as of 2017, several companies and individuals are selling parts to build various RepRap designs, with prices starting at about £99 / US$100.

The open source Fab@Home project has developed printers for general use with anything that can be extruded through a nozzle, from chocolate to silicone sealant and chemical reactants. Printers following the project's designs have been available from suppliers in kits or in pre-assembled form since 2012 at prices in the US$2,000 range.

The LulzBot 3D printers manufactured by Aleph Objects are another example of an open-source application of fused deposition modeling technology. The flagship model in the LulzBot line, the TAZ printer takes inspiration for its design from the RepRap Mendel90 and Prusa i3 models. The LulzBot 3D printer is currently the only printer on the market to have received the "Respects Your Freedom" certification from the Free Software Foundation.

As of September 2018 RepRap style printers are readily available in kit form through online retailers. These kits come complete with all parts needed to make a functioning printer, often including electronic files for test printing as well as a small quantity of PLA filament.

Filaments used for printing with FFF printers are also substantially more cost-effective than their SLA resin counterparts. If we use 3DBenchy as a benchmark for comparing both technologies, it would cost roughly $0.20 to print such a model with an FFF machine, whereas the same object would cost almost $1.00 if created with resin.

=== Materials ===
Plastic is the most common material for 3d printing via FFF and other EAM variants. Various polymers may be used, including acrylonitrile butadiene styrene (ABS), polycarbonate (PC), polylactic acid (PLA), high-density polyethylene (HDPE), PC/ABS, polyethylene terephthalate (PETG), polyphenylsulfone (PPSU) and high impact polystyrene (HIPS). In general, the polymer is in the form of a filament fabricated from virgin resins. Additionally, fluoropolymers such as PTFE tubing are used in the process due to the material's ability to withstand high temperatures. This ability is especially useful in transferring filaments.

The many different variants of EAM, i.e. of material Extrusion based Additive Manufacturing allow dealing with many additional material types, summarised in the table below. Several material classes can be extruded and 3d printed:

- Thermoplastic polymers, it is the most typical application of FFF;
- Composite materials with polymeric matrix and short or long hard fibers;
- Ceramic slurries and clays, often used in combination with the robocasting technique;
- Green mixtures of ceramic or metal powders and polymeric binders, used in EAM of metals and ceramics;
- Food pastes;
- Biological pastes, used in bioprinting.

Materials that can be 3d printed with EAM (additive manufacturing technologies by material extrusion)
Material class	examples	Post-processing requirements	Typical applications
Thermoplastic polymers	PLA, PETG, ABS, ASA, HDPE, PPSF, PC, Ultem 9085, PEEK, recycled plastics	Support removal	General purpose. These materials have varying physical properties, such as heat resistance, UV resistance, storage requirements, ease of printing, cost, and chemical tolerance. They are available in a variety of formulations to fine tune them to the specific applications (such as ESD material blends, or the addition of flame retardants).
Polymer matrix composites	GFRP, CFRP	Support removal, curing	Structural applications
Ceramic slurries and clays	Alumina, zirconia, kaolin	Support removal, furnace drying and sintering	Insulation, consumers objects, dental applications
Green ceramic/binder mixture	Zirconia, calcium phosphate	Support removal, debinding, sintering	structural ceramics, piezoelectric components
Green metal/binder mixture	Stainless steel, titanium, Inconel	Support removal, debinding, sintering	Tooling, fixtures, mechanical parts
Green metal/ceramic/binder mixture	Stainless steel, Iron, tricalciumphosphate, yttria-stabilized zirconia	Support removal, debinding, sintering	Mechanical parts, implants
Food pastes	Chocolate, sugar	Support removal	
Biological materials	Bioink		Bioprinted organs and scaffolds
Conductive polymer composites	Composites with carbon black, graphene, carbon nanotubes or copper nanoparticles	Annealing for lower conductivity	Sensors
polymer derived ceramics (PDCs)	Polylactic acid (PLA), polycarbonate (PC), nylon alloys, polypropylene (PP), polyethylene terephthalate glycol (PETG), polyethylene terephthalate (PET), and co-polyesters; and flexible materials including: flexible PLA, thermoplastic elastomer and thermoplastic polyurethane filaments	To make SiOC(N) first the printed polymer is dipped in PDC, absorbed then sintered	Heat exchangers, heat sinks, scaffoldings for bone tissue growth, chemical/ gas filters and custom scientific hardware

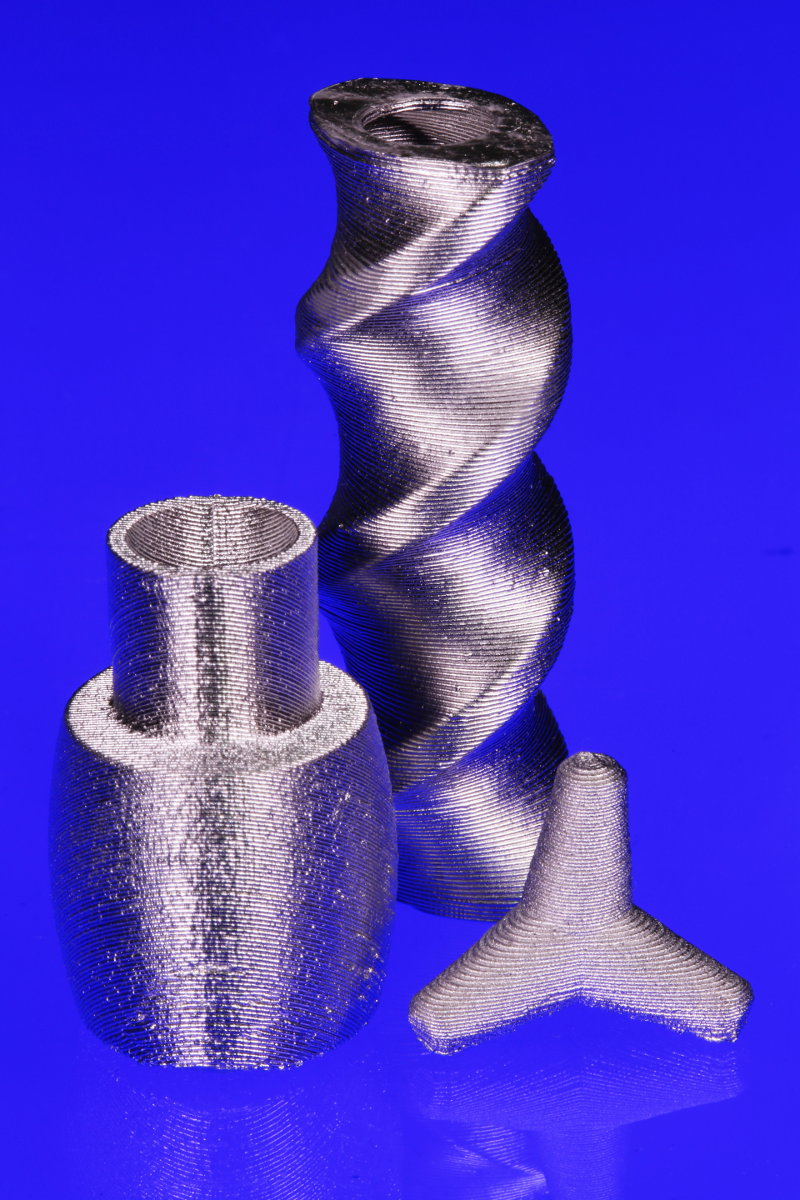
FFF printed and sintered components made of stainless steel (316L)

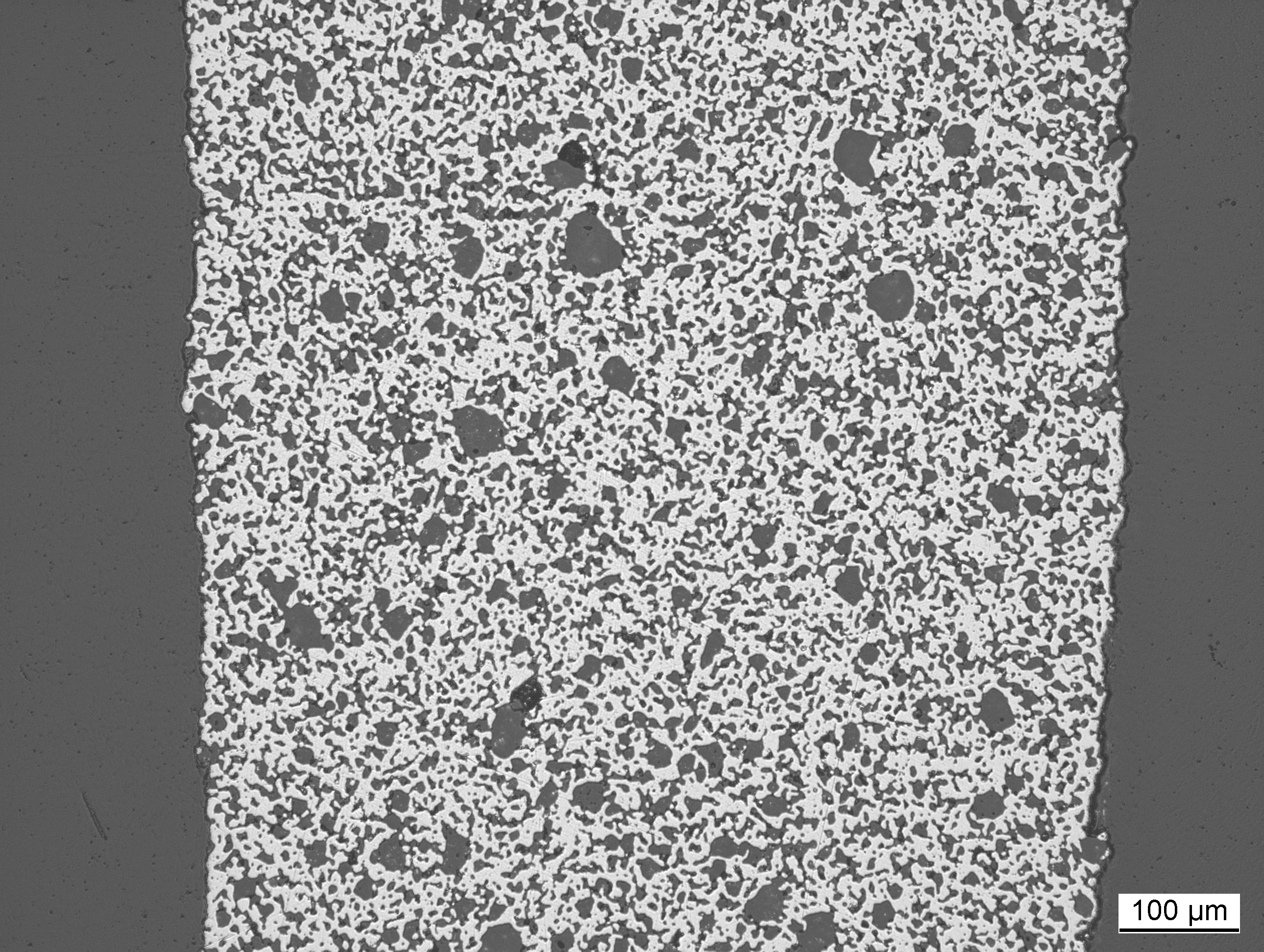
Metallographic section of printed and sintered filament layer (iron-tricalciumphosphate-composite)

== Print head kinematics ==
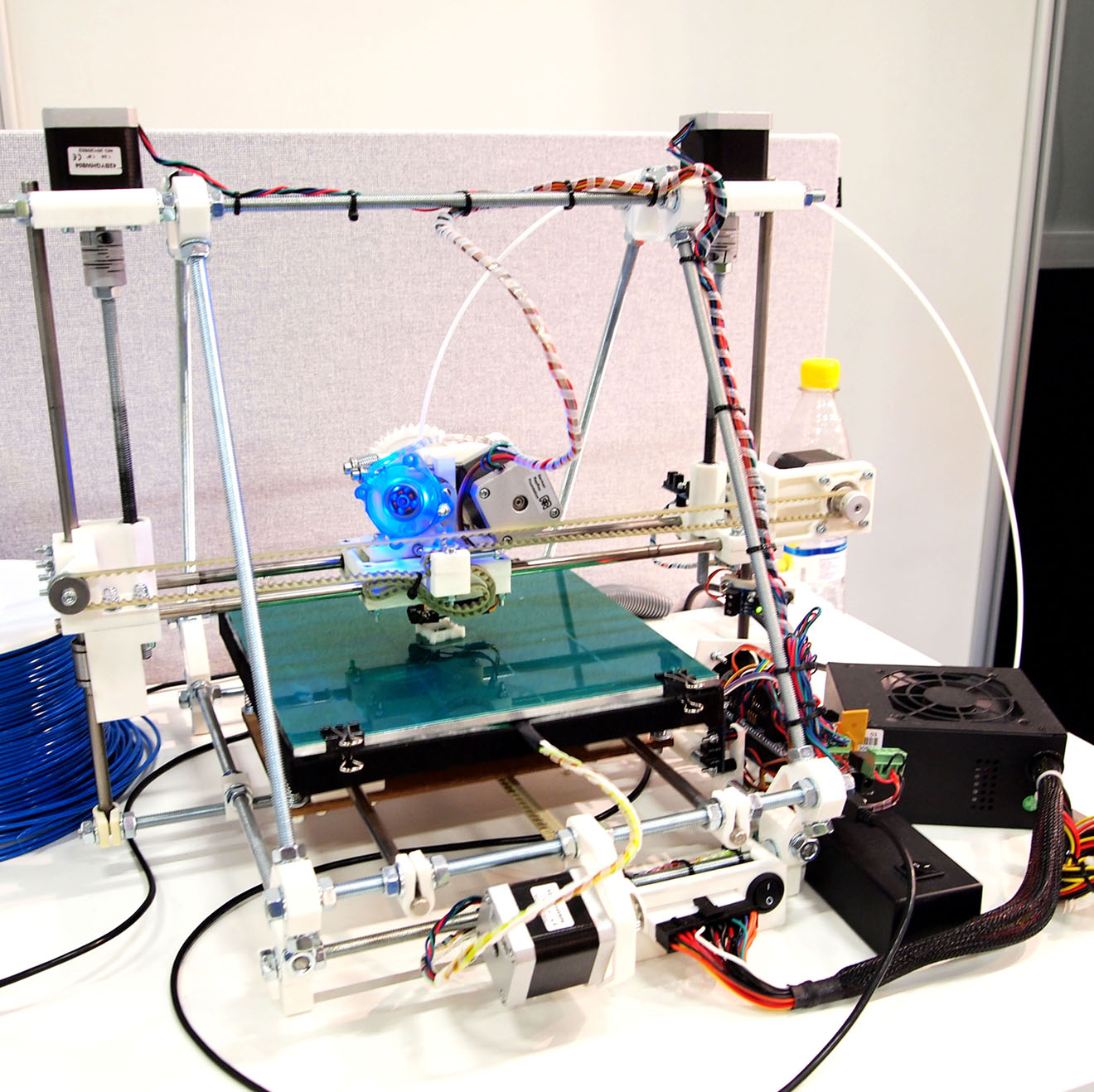
RepRap-type printer

The majority of fused filament printers follow the same basic design. A flat bed is used as the starting point for the print workpiece. A gantry above this carries the moving print head. The gantry design is optimized for movement mostly in the horizontal X & Y directions, with a slow climb in the Z direction as the piece is printed. Stepper motors drive the movement through either leadscrews or toothed belt drives. It is common, owing to the differences in movement speed, to use toothed belts for the X, Y drives and a leadscrew for Z. Some machines also have X axis movement on the gantry, but move the bed (and print job) for Y. As, unlike laser cutters, head movement speeds are low, stepper motors are universally used and there is no need to use servomotors instead.

Many printers, originally those influenced by the RepRap project, make extensive use of 3D printed components in their own construction. These are typically printed connector blocks with a variety of angled holes, joined by cheap steel threaded rod. This makes a construction that is cheap and easy to assemble, easily allows non-perpendicular framing joints, but does require access to a 3D printer. The notion of 'bootstrapping' 3D printers like this has been something of a dogmatic theme within the RepRap designs. The lack of stiffness in the rod also requires either triangulation, or gives the risk of a gantry structure that flexes and vibrates in service, reducing print quality.

Many machines, especially commercial machines such as the Bambu X1, Ultimaker S Series and Creality K2, now use box-like semi-enclosed frames of either laser-cut plywood, plastic, pressed steel sheet and more recently aluminum extrusions. These are cheap, rigid and can also be used as the basis for an enclosed print volume, allowing temperature control within it to control warping of the print job.

A handful of machines use polar coordinates instead, usually machines optimized to print objects with circular symmetry. These have a radial gantry movement and a rotating bed. Although there are some potential mechanical advantages to this design for printing hollow cylinders, their different geometry and the resulting non-mainstream approach to print planning still keeps them from being popular as yet. Although it is an easy task for a robot's motion planning to convert from Cartesian to polar coordinates, gaining any advantage from this design also requires the print slicing algorithms to be aware of the rotational symmetry from the outset.

=== Extruder mount to rest of machine ===
The ways extruders are mounted on the rest of the machine have evolved over time into informal mounting standards. Such factor standards allow new extruder designs to be tested on existing printer frames, and new printer frame designs to use existing extruders. These informal standards include:

- Vertical X Axis Standard
- Quick-fit extruder mount
- OpenX mount

==== Delta robot printers ====
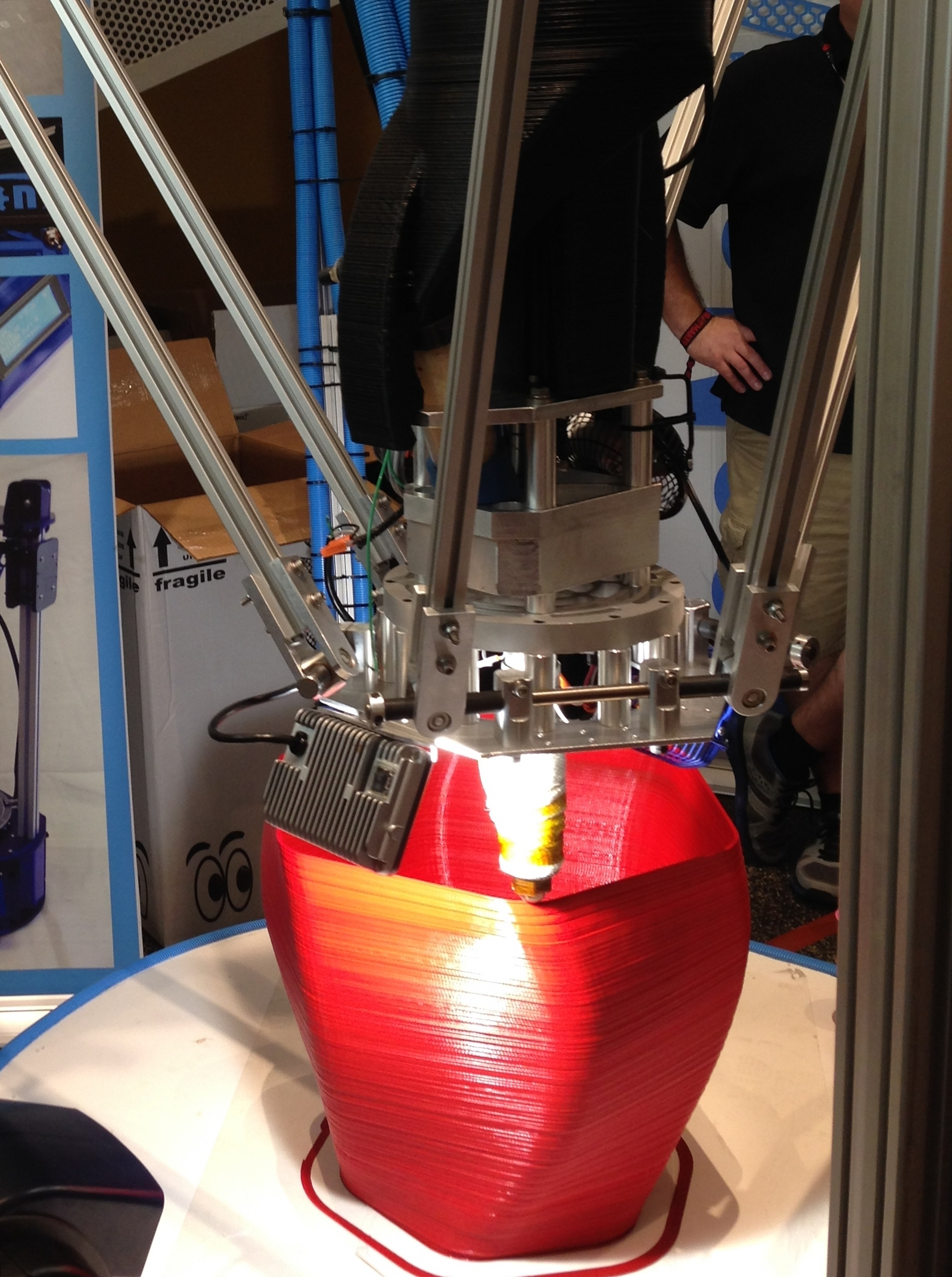
Printing by a large delta robot printer

A different approach is taken with 'Rostock' or 'Kossel' pattern printers, based on a delta robot mechanism. These have a large open print volume with a three-armed delta robot mounted at the top. This design of robot is noted for its low inertia and ability for fast movement over a large volume. Stability and freedom from vibration when moving a heavy print head on the end of spindly arms is a technical challenge though. This design has mostly been favored as a means of gaining a large print volume without a large and heavy gantry.

As the print head moves, the distance of its filament from storage coil to head also changes; the tension created on the filament is another technical challenge to overcome to avoid affecting the print quality.

== Ambient temperature ==
Most printers are designed to function optimally at room temperature (approximately 18–25 °C) and preferably with as low humidity as possible, and during printing it is important that the temperature and humidity remain stable and that drafts are avoided to prevent the plastic from warping.

Some plastics require a heated chamber. For example, PLA should be printed at room temperature (18-25 celsius), while ABS should have a consistent chamber temperature of around 60-70 celsius. If the printer is to be placed in a chamber, it is important that the printer is designed for such use, for example by having electronics with active cooling, to reduce the risk of fire.

== Health ==
Filament printers may have negative effects on health and safety due to dust and harmful emissions, but little research has been published. 3D printers have become popular in businesses, educational institutions and libraries. Children may be more susceptible to harm, but most of the research has been done on adults. It is recommended that schools and makerspaces consider ventilation, air quality measurements, and engineering controls to reduce indoor exposure.

=== VOC and particulate matter ===
Filament printers are a major source of volatile organic compounds (VOCs, substances that easily dissolve in the air) and particulate matter (PM, particles that remain suspended in the air for a long time). 3D printers emit ultrafine particles (in the order of magnitude 1 to 100 nanometers), and research has shown that these are small enough to lodge deep in the respiratory system and be difficult for the body to get rid of.

One study measured over 400 different types of VOCs, several of which were irritants, sensitizing (first step in an allergic reaction), asthma-inducing (causes the development of asthma), emit odors, are carcinogens (promotes the development of cancer), developmental toxic (harms development) and reproductive toxic (disrupts reproduction), which can cause inflammation, respiratory diseases, neurotoxicity and cancer.

Some specific VOCs that have been measured from 3D printing include lactide, styrene, ethylbenzene, formaldehyde, acetaldehyde, nonanal, tetrahydrofuran, cyclohexanone, butanone, crotonaldehyde, acrylic acid, hydroxyethyl acrylate and methyl methacrylate.

=== Preventive measures ===
The place of printing should be well ventilated, which can be difficult since good printing often depends on a consistent room temperature and minimal drafts. Air quality can be measured with an air quality meter that can detect VOC and particulate matter. Printers should not be placed in bedrooms or living rooms, but instead in other places where people do not spend much time, such as in a heated garage, basement or attic. The amount of dust in the printing environment should also be limited, for example by vacuuming more often.

Some people place the printer in a cabinet with an exhaust fan through a HEPA filter or activated carbon, but these filters do not remove all particles and exhaust gases. Exhaust to the outdoor air may be beneficial.

Lower temperatures in the hotend can produce less emissions, but can also result in poorer print quality. One can choose materials that are less harmful, for example PLA has a reputation for being safer than ABS (but still emits harmful substances).

== See also ==
- 3D pen
- Extruder (3D printing)
- Fab lab
- Fab@Home
- FDM printing file formats
- G-code
- Hyrel 3D
- MakerBot
- Marlin (firmware)
- Methacrylate
- Plastic extrusion
- Printrbot
- Rapid prototyping
- RepRap
- Robo 3D
- Selective laser melting
- Selective laser sintering
- Sindoh
- Spindle
- Stereolithography
- Thermistor
- Thermocouple
- Ultimaker
- Von Neumann universal constructor
