= Extruder (3D printing) =

Filament feeding mechanisms used in some types of 3D printers

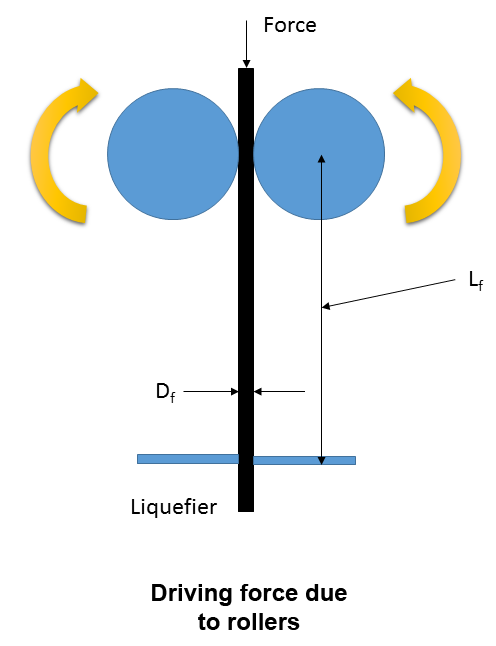
On a Bowden design, the feeding mechanism (here indicated with two roller wheels) often sits relatively far away from the hot end part of the extruder.

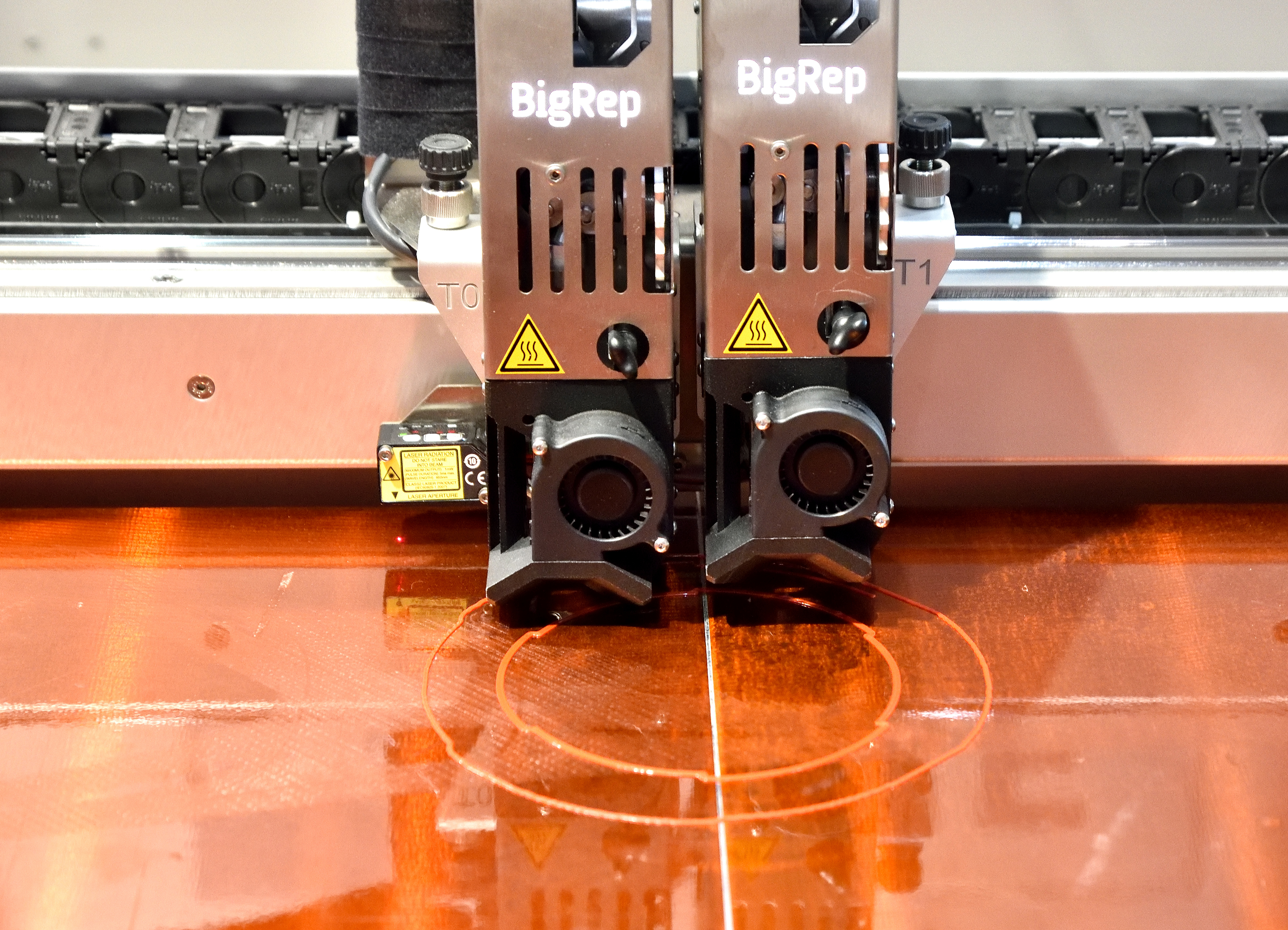
Dual extruder

A 3D printer extruder is a filament feeding mechanism used in many fused filament fabrication (FFF) 3D printers. There are several types of 3D printer extruders. A Bowden extruder is a type of extruder that pushes filament through a long and flexible PTFE (Teflon) tube to the hot end. An alternative type of extruder which is also widely used in filament 3D printers is the direct-drive extruder, which sits closer to the extruder hot end.

== Bowden extruder ==
Bowden type extruders are easier to swap since they are outside the print head. They also have less chance of tangling the filament while it unwinds from the spool. Additionally, they reduce the mass of the extrusion carriage because it doesn't have to hold a stepper motor. This allows for faster changes in print head movement direction, increased print speed, increased accuracy, and decreased instances of artifacting or ghosting along the x and y axes.

One disadvantage is that because Bowden extruders push filament through a long and curved tube, more friction must be overcome compared with direct drive extruders. To partially mitigate these friction forces, the tube is made of PTFE, which has a low coefficient of friction. Flexible filaments do not print well because the filament flexes inside the tube and clogs up the machine.

Another disadvantage is that the feeding distance is relatively long, and thus the resistance is high, meaning the stepping motor of extrusion is required to have a higher torque. The long distance can also lead to more backlash.

== Direct-drive extruder ==
Printhead with hotend and a direct-drive extruder

With a direct-drive extruder, the motor pushing the filament is installed by the hotend and pushes the filament directly into the nozzle. Direct-drive designs have several advantages, and typically give better extrusion, faster retraction, are able to print more types of filaments, and can use a smaller and lighter motor due to the short distance to the nozzle. One typical disadvantage of direct-drive extruders is the added mass to the hotend, compared to a typical Bowden extruder, which may cause more vibrations so that the direct-drive printhead has to move slower, which can affect print speed. Another typical disadvantage is more complex maintenance due to tight packaging of many components in the hotend.

== Filament compatibility ==
Bowden extruders: Works better with rigid filaments such as PLA, ABS and PETG which are less likely to buckle while inside the Bowden tube. Flexible filaments such as TPU will struggle with Bowden extruders since it has a long path to get to the hotend, The friction inside the bowden tube and compressible nature of the filament will make it difficult to use with a bowden extruder.

Direct-drive extruder: Works well with both flexible and rigid filaments. Since the extruder sits on top of the hotend, the filament travel distance from the extruder to the hotend is minimal, due to this reason even flexible filaments such as TPU will print well with a direct drive extruder.

== See also ==
- Lyman filament extruder, a DIY device for manufacturing new filament from plastic pellets or recycled filament
