= Creality =

Chinese manufacturer of 3D printers

Shenzhen Creality 3D Technology Co, Ltd.
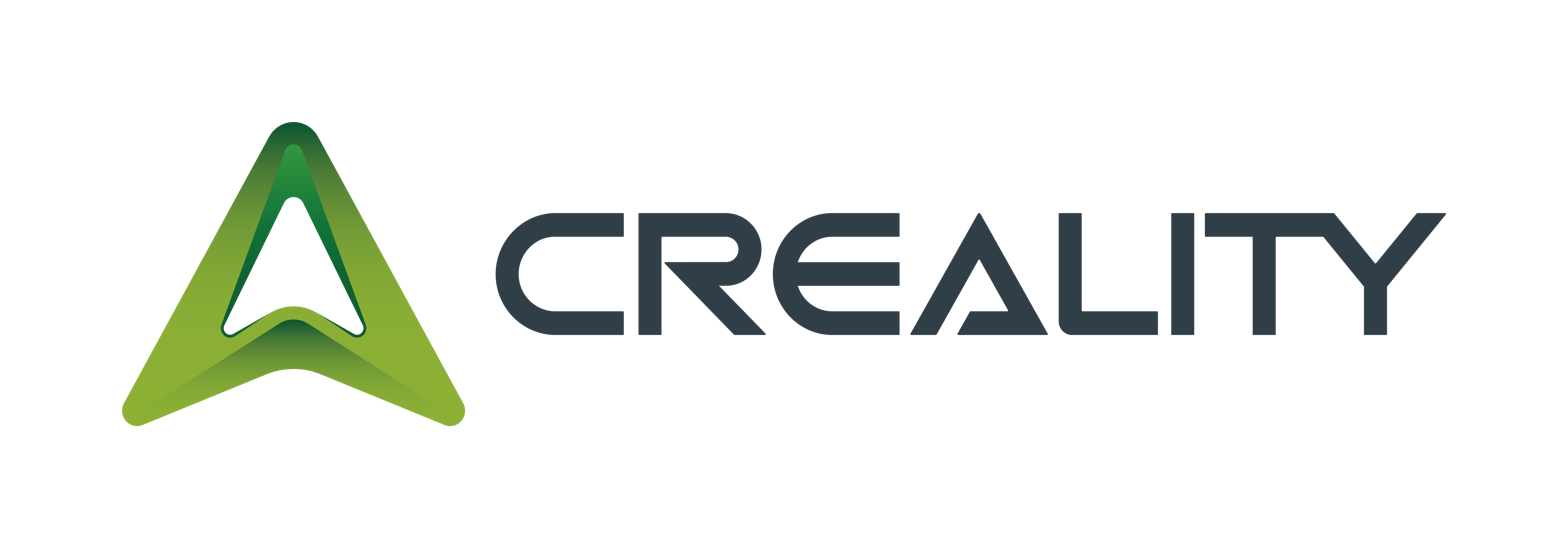
- Native name: 深圳市创想三维科技股份有限公司
- Industry: 3D printing
- Founded: 2014; 12 years ago
- Founders: Chen Chun, Ao Danjun, Liu Huilin, Tang Jingke
- Headquarters: Shenzhen
- Website: www.creality.com

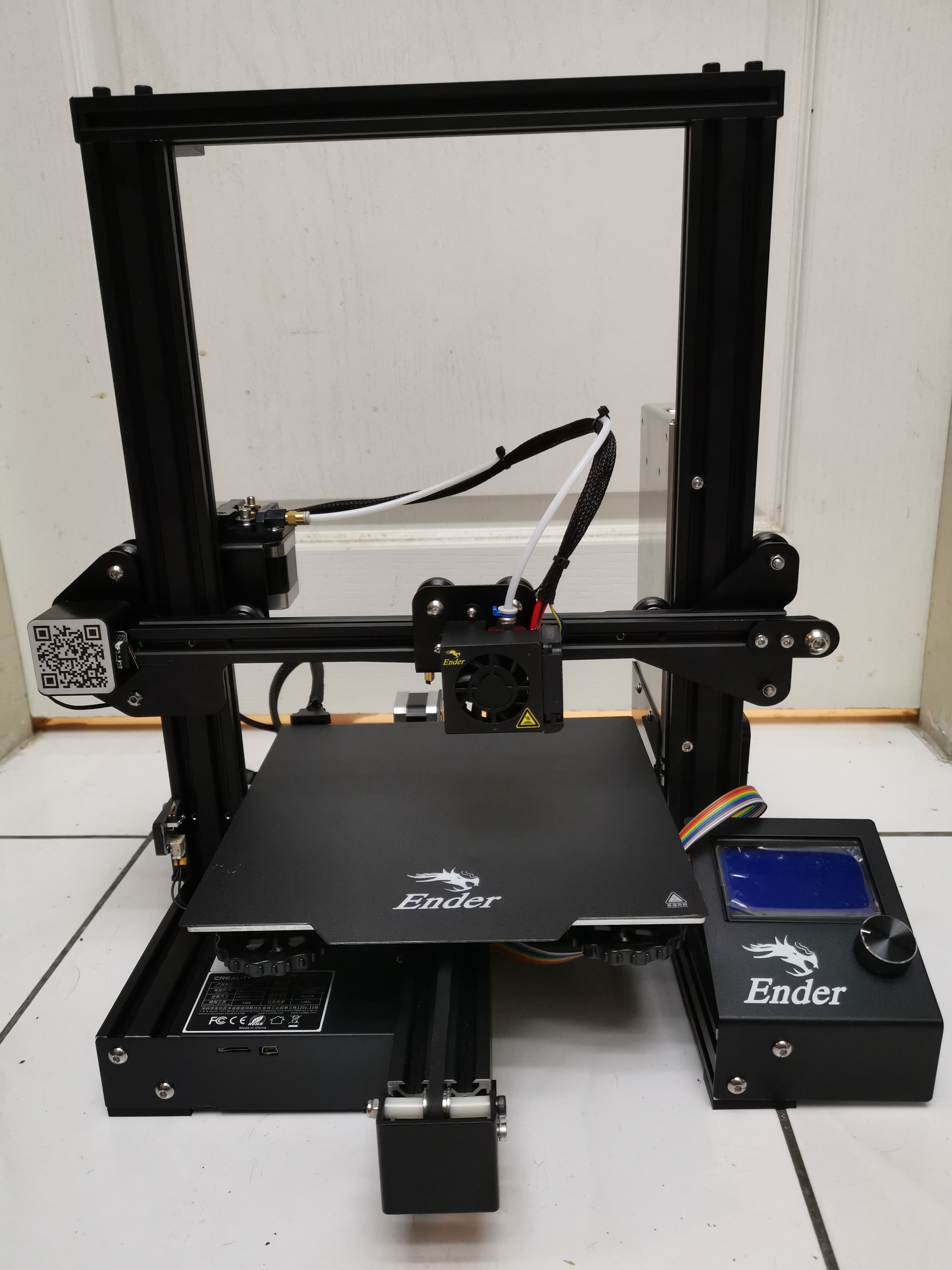
Creality Ender 3 Pro

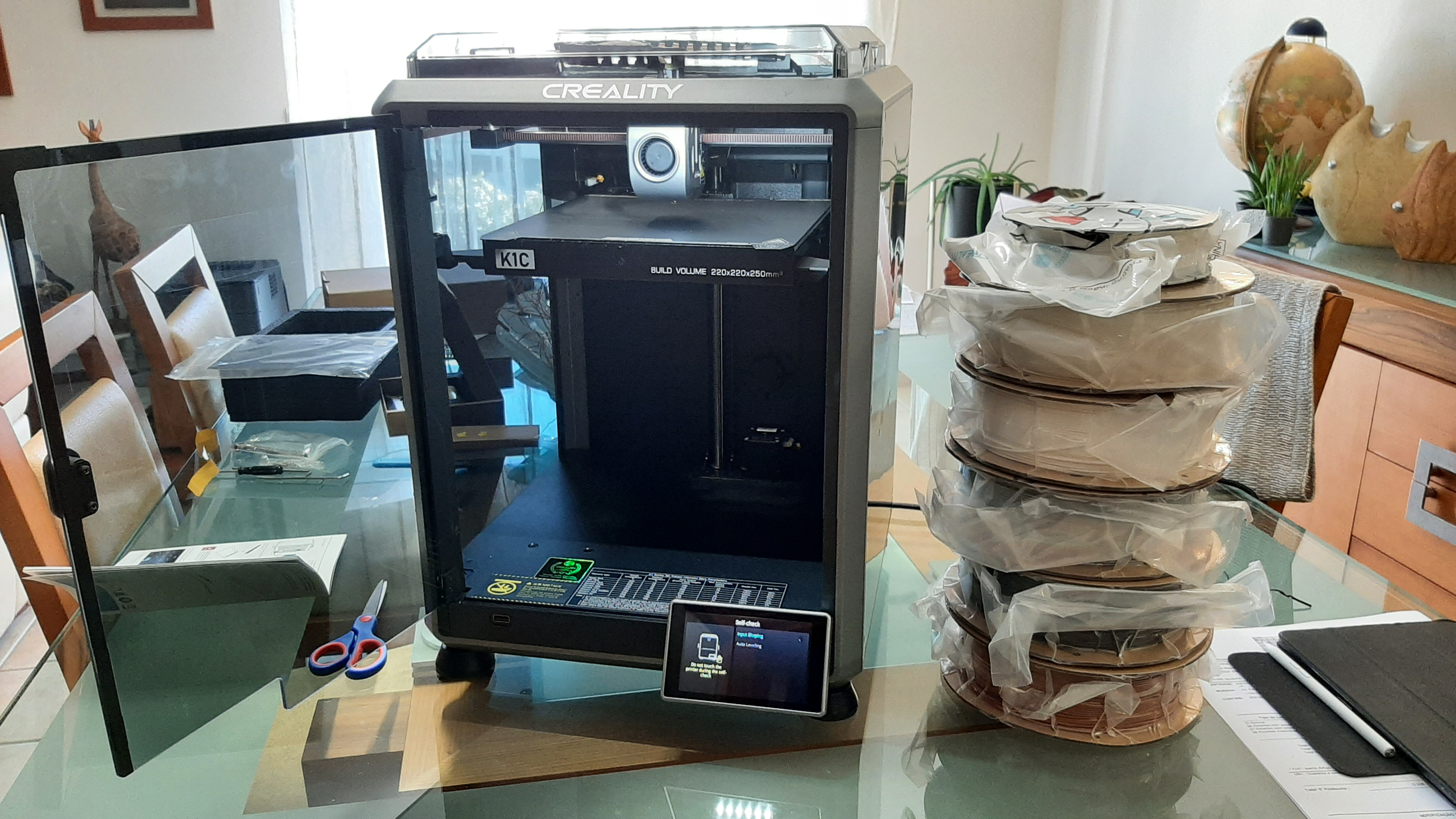
Creality K1C

Creality (simplified Chinese: 创想三维; traditional Chinese: 創想三維; pinyin: Chuàngxiǎng sānwéi; lit. 'Create and think 3D'), officially known as Shenzhen Creality 3D Technology Co, Ltd., is a Chinese 3D printer manufacturing company established in 2014, with headquarters located in Shenzhen. Its main products are consumer and industrial-grade 3D printers.

The company was first conceived in 2014 when four young college graduates, Jack Chen (Chen Chun), Adun Ao (Ao Danjun), Fred Liu (Liu Huilin), and Michael Tang (Tang Jingke), met at a 3D-printing exhibition; they went on to found Creality together.

== History ==
In January 2020, Creality launched its 3D printing platform, Creality Cloud. In April 2021, the company introduced an entry-level 2K monochrome resin 3D printer.

In April 2023, Creality released the K1 3D printer.

In January 2024, after many complaints about the K1, the company released the K1C 3D printer which fixed many of the K1's shortcomings and allows for Carbon Fibre printing.

Creality has shipped 4.4 million units of 3D printers (2020-2024). They have 6 million subscribers and followers, and 5.7 million registered users on Creality Cloud.

== Printers ==
- 2016
  - CR-10
- 2017
  - Ender 2
  - CR-10 Mini
- 2018
  - Ender 3
  - CR-10S
  - CR-X
  - Ender 3 Pro
- 2020
  - Ender 3 V2
  - Ender 3 Max
  - CR-6 SE
- 2021
  - Ender 3 S1
  - Ender 2 Pro
  - CR10 Smart
- 2022
  - Ender 3 S1 Pro
  - Ender 3 S1 Plus
  - Ender 3 Neo
  - Ender 3 V2 Neo
  - Ender 3 Max Neo
- 2023
  - K1
  - K1 Max
  - Ender 3 V3 SE
  - Ender 3 V3 KE
  - CR-10 SE
- 2024
  - K1C
  - K1 SE
  - K2 Plus
  - Ender 3 V3
  - Ender 3 V3 Plus
- 2025
  - K2 Pro
  - K2 Standard
  - Ender 3 Hi
  - Hi Combo
- 2026
  - K2 Max AI
  - SPARKX i7
  - Sermoon S1
  - K3
  - SPARKX i8
  - Ender-3 V3 Neo
  - Ender-3 V3 Mega
  - mBox

== Controversies ==
Creality has a history of GPL violations around the Marlin firmware and other GPL software. The first documented case is from 2018, and Creality continued this behavior until at least 2022.

In March 2022, Creality was sued by Artec for allegedly plagiarizing Artec Studio's software code. The case was filed in the New York Eastern District Court on March 25 and is still pending.
