= Erick Wolf =

- Born: 1974 (age 51–52); Delaware, United States
- Education: St. Andrew's School; Rensselaer Polytechnic Institute (BS)
- Occupations: Entrepreneur, Engineer, Lawyer
- Known for: Airwolf 3D
- Spouse: Eva Wolf

Erick Wolf (born 1974 in Delaware) is a 3D printing evangelist and a patent attorney. He is the co-founder and the current CEO of Airwolf 3D, a professional-grade 3D printers company. He was awarded the Outstanding Enterprise Hardware & Device Award at the OC Tech Alliance 21st Annual High Tech Awards dinner for the HDx 3D Printer.

== Early life ==
Wolf was raised in Pennsylvania and graduated from St. Andrew's School. He received a Bachelor of Science in Mechanical Engineering from Rensselaer Polytechnic Institute in 1997. He then attended Whittier Law School to complete doctor of law degree. Wolf started his career at WHGC as an attorney, where he practiced patent law and litigation for 8 years. In 2011, while using a 3D printer, he encountered issues of getting the 3D printer to print. With the replacement parts, he tried to fix the printer by himself, which was ultimately scrapped for parts. He began to start working on his own printer and which was named the Airwolf 3D. Wolf started the company in 2012 in Southern California along with his wife Eva wolf and started shipping fully assembled 3D printers. He designed the AW3D HDL, AW3D v.4, AW3D 5, AW3D 5.5, the AW3D XL, the HD professional-grade 3D printers and the most recently the AXIOM.

== Career ==
Wolf coined the phrase ‘3D Flash Print’ which involved makers from around the globe working together for dispatching 3D printer code to 3D printers around the world to get them to print simultaneously like a “flash mob”. He was named as a “Rising Star” from 2009 - 2014 by Super Lawyers. Wolf was selected as a semifinalist for Ernst & Young’s Entrepreneur of the Year 2015 Award in Orange County.

He co-invented “wolfbite”, material for use in promoting adhesion and reducing warpage in 3D printing; bonding agents and adhesives; chemical products for use in 3D printing. In 2015, Wolf supervised the Airwolf 3D’s breaking event of the Guinness World Record.

== Patents ==
Wolf is a named inventor on four 3D printing-related utility patents:

- U.S. Patent No. 10,195,778 (Three-dimensional printer systems and methods),
- U.S. Patent No. 10,428,248 (Enhancing 3D printer platform adhesion and/or reducing warpage in printed parts),
- U.S. Patent No. 10,994,480 (Three-dimensional Printer Systems And Methods),
- U.S. Patent No. 11,446,877 (3D printing water soluble support filament).
