= Airwolf 3D =

American manufacturer of 3D printers

- Type: Private
- Industry: 3D printing
- Founded: May 2012
- Founder: Erick Wolf and Eva Wolf
- Headquarters: Costa Mesa, California, United States
- Key people: Erick Wolf, Chairman and Mark Mathews, President
- Products: 3D printers
- Number of employees: 25–30
- Website: www.airwolf3d.com

Airwolf 3D is a 3D printer designer headquartered in Costa Mesa, California. It was founded in 2012 by Eva and Erick Wolf.

== History ==
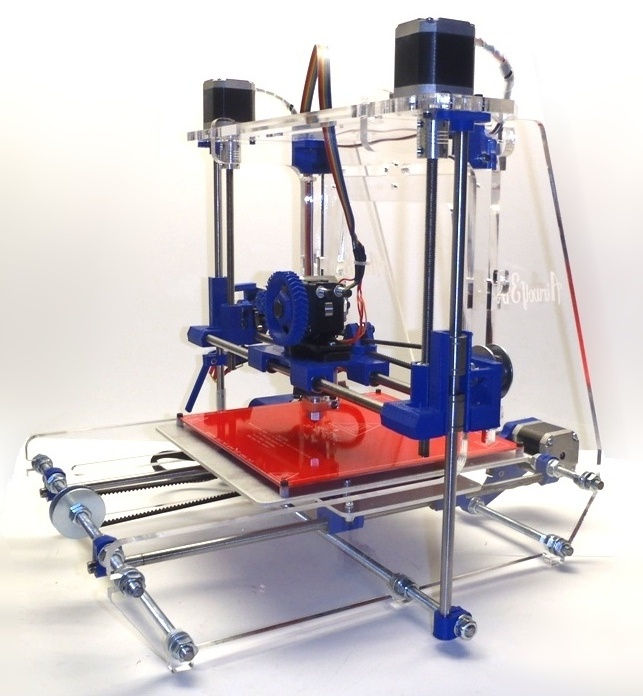
AW3D v.4; Forerunner to the 5.5 and XL

Airwolf 3D was founded in May 2012 by Erick Wolf and his wife Eva. The idea for the company originated after Erick purchased a 3D printer in late 2011. While attempting to use the printer to create replacement parts, he encountered difficulties and limitations in the machine's capabilities. This led Erick to develop the first Airwolf 3D model.

The original Airwolf printer (v.4) was derived from the Prusa Mendel and Mecano Air designs, hence the name "Airwolf."

The company started shipping fully assembled 3D printers in June 2012 from their garage in Newport Beach, California. The first printer was sold to Lars Brubaker and Kevin Pope of MatterHackers. MatterHackers went on to develop MatterControl, a 3D printing software.

== Products ==
=== AW3D 5.5 ===
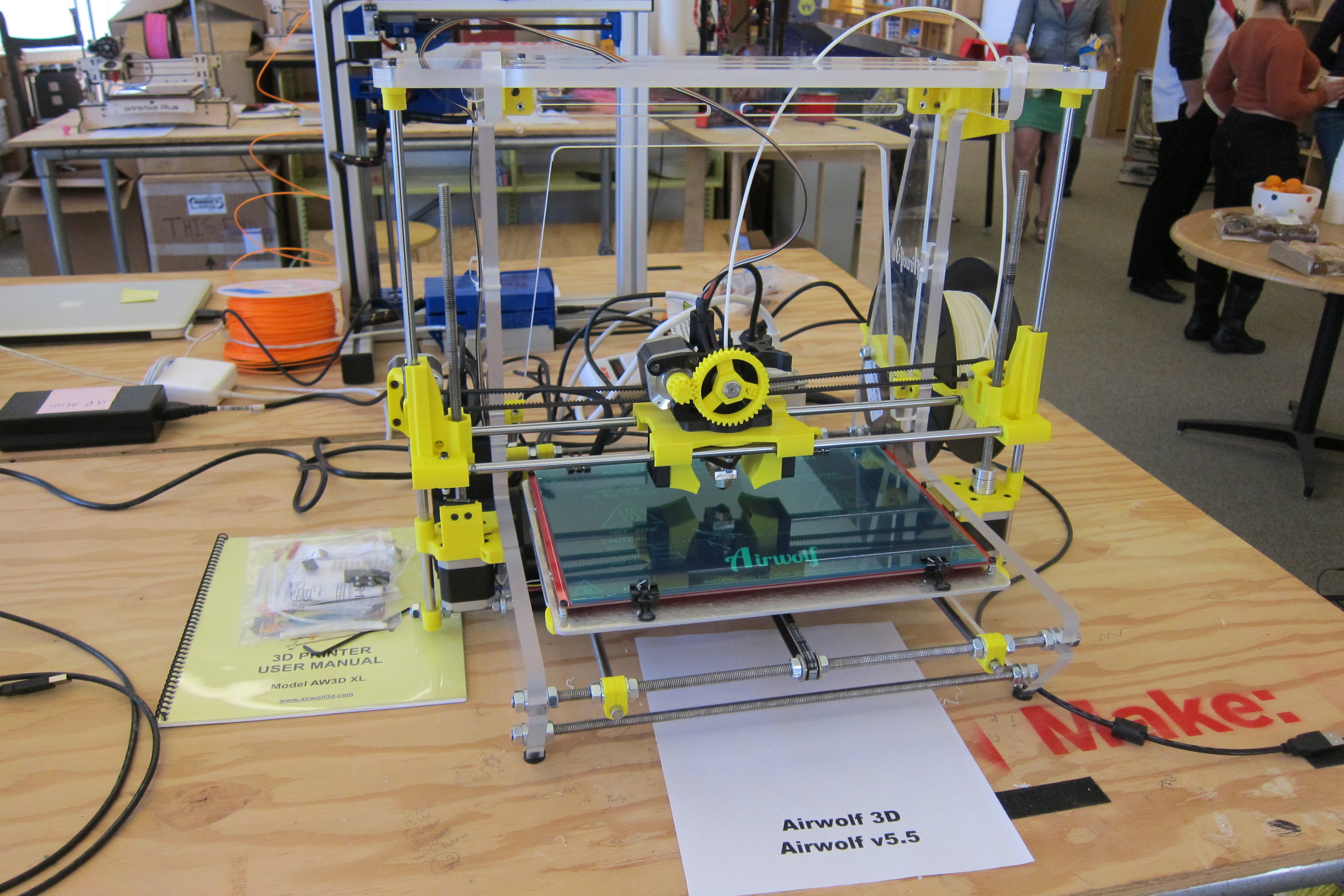
AW3D 5.5

The AW3D 5.5 was introduced in late 2012 and superseded the v.4 and v.5. The maximum printing volume is 195 × 212 × 112 mm.

=== AW3D XL ===
The AW3D XL was introduced in January 2013. The maximum printing surface is approximately 12" x 8" x 7". It operates on a RAMBo board made by Ultimachine.

=== AW3D HD ===
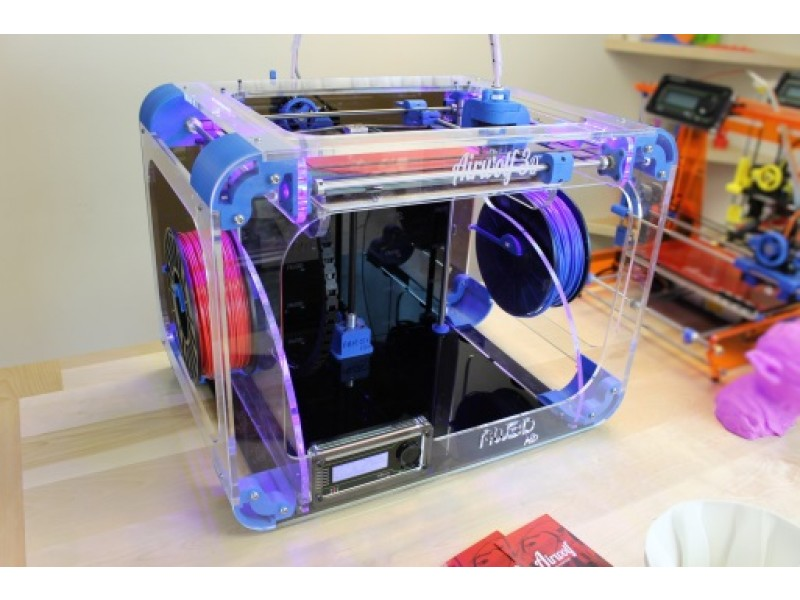
The Airwolf 3D model HD was a 3D printer equipped with a single print head which was capable of layer-to-layer resolutions as fine as 0.06 mm (0.002 in).

The AW3D HD was introduced in November 2013 at the 3D Print Show in Paris, France. It featured a print area of approximately 12" x 8" x 12". The AW3D HD featured a print volume of 12" x 8" x 12" (1150 in^{3}) and had a layer-to-layer resolution of 0.06 mm (0.002 in). The HD was equipped with a single print head that came standard with a 0.5 mm nozzle or a 0.35 mm nozzle as an option.

=== AW3D HDL ===
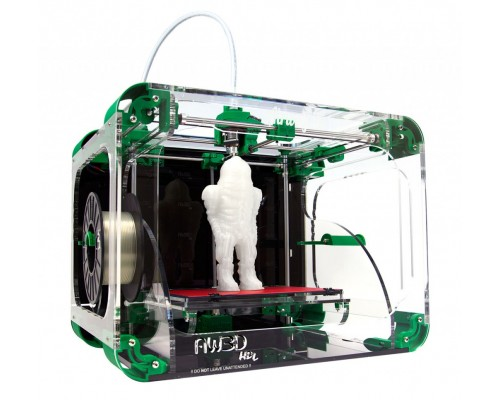
Airwolf 3D model HDL. This 3d printer was offered with an unheated print bed and a single print nozzle capable of a 0.08 mm layer-to-layer print resolution.

The AW3D HDL was the Airwolf 3D base model 3D printer. It was equipped with an unheated print bed and a single print head capable of sustained temperatures of 260 °C (500 °F). The AW3D had a print resolution of 0.08 mm with a maximum print speed of 150m m/s. The AW3D had a build volume of 12" x 8" x 11" (1056 in^{3}) and came standard with 0.5 mm print nozzle or a 0.35 mm nozzle optional.

=== AW3D HDx ===
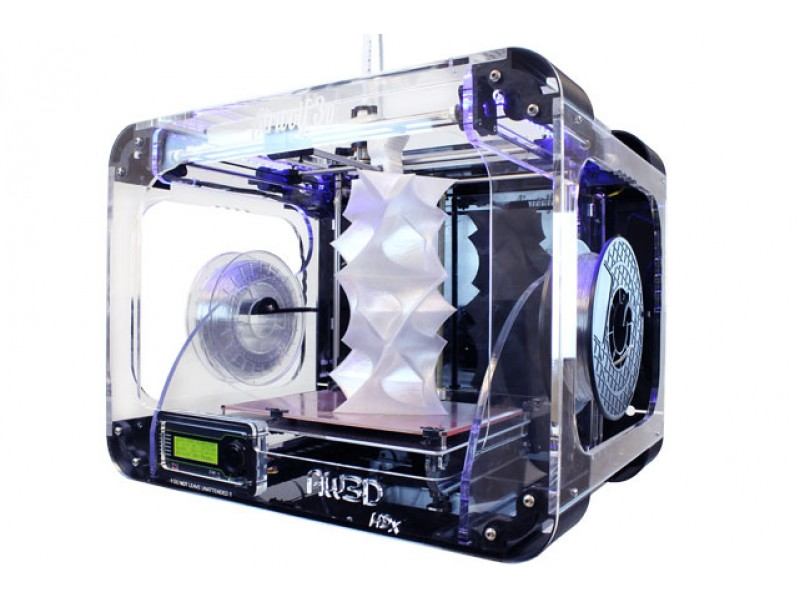
The Airwolf 3D model Hdx. This 3d printer included a proprietary JRX print head capable of sustained temperatures of approximately 315 °C (599 °F).

The AW3D HDx was introduced in May 2014. The HDx uses the JRx hot end and can continuously hold temperatures of up to 599 °F (315 °C).The HDX had a print volume of 12" x 8" x 12" (1150 in^{3}) and had a layer-to-layer resolution of 0.06 mm (0.002 in). The HDx was selected as Editor's Pick of the Week by Desktop Engineering.

=== AW3D HD2x ===
The AW3D HD2x was a dual-head 3D printer that was introduced in 2014. The HD2x featured a dual print head capable of sustained temperatures of 315 °C (599 °F). The original HD2x was designed for traditional hard-wired printing and slicing functionality; however, wireless capability was later provided by Airwolf 3D's Wolfbox wireless controller. The HD2x was capable of printing in two different colors or two different materials simultaneously, provided that the two materials had similar extruding temperatures. The HD2x had a print volume of 11" X 8" x 12" (1056in^{3}) and offered a layer-to-layer resolution as fine as 0.06 mm (0.002 in).

=== AW3D HD-R ===
The AW3D HD-R was introduced at the 2015 Consumer Electronics Show. The HD-R was the first Airwolf 3D model to offer integrated Wi-Fi and cloud based slicing, file storage, and file management based on the AstroPrint platform by 3DaGoGo. The HD-R came equipped with dual print heads, each capable of sustained temperatures of 315 °C (599 °F). The dual print head configuration allowed the user to print with two different colors or two different types of filaments, provided that the filaments had similar extruding temperatures. The HD-R was built with an improved aluminum backbone for rigidity, and had a maximum build envelope of 11" x 8" x 12" (1056 in^{3}). The HD-R had a print resolution of 0.06 mm (0.002 in) and came standard with a 0.5 mm nozzle or an optional 0.35 mm nozzle.

=== Wolfbite ===
Wolfbite is a 3D printing adhesive to facilitate the bonding and removal of nylon and nylon blend prints from glass and ceramic build plates. The product was formulated to solve the problems of warping and adhesion that are inherent when 3D printing with nylon.

== See also ==
- List of 3D printer manufacturers
