= Aleph Objects =

American manufacturer of 3D printers

- Type: Private company
- Industry: 3D printing, Manufacturing
- Headquarters: Loveland, Colorado, United States
- Key people: Jeff Moe CEO CTO; Steven Abadie COO
- Products: 3D printing hardware
- Revenue: $21 Million
- Number of employees: 8
- Website: www.alephobjects.com

Aleph Objects, Inc. was a small manufacturing company based in Loveland, Colorado. Their business model focused around the development of open-source hardware for 3D printing with full support for free and open-source software.

In November 2019, following staff layoffs due to financial difficulties, Aleph Objects' assets and the LulzBot brand were acquired by Fargo Additive Manufacturing Equipment 3D (FAME 3D), which relocated operations and manufacturing to Fargo, North Dakota.

== LulzBot ==
The company is most well known for its LulzBot 3D printer product line, which although using some extruded aluminum railing and other mass-production components still remains true to RepRap principles by having many components 3D printable.

Due to its fully open source hardware and open source software design, the LulzBot Taz 6 has received "Respects Your Freedom" certification from the Free Software Foundation. In addition, the Lulzbot printers are often used in open-source tool chains on open source projects. For example, Superior Enzymes used a LulzBot TAZ in fabricating an open source photometer for nitrate testing. Similarly, Lulzbot 3D printers are used in projects to create low-cost prosthetic hands.

Due in a large part to relative ease of maintenance and use, Lulzbot printers are one of several desktop 3D printers have been recommended for libraries by reviewers. In its 2014 Ultimate Guide to 3D Printing special issue, Make Magazine awarded the Lulzbot TAZ "best documentation" of all the hobbyist-grade 3D printers that were tested.

The TAZ 4 was released in early 2014 with several key improvements to the TAZ platform to make it more robust and capable. This included a newly engineered drive rod system, redesigned y-axis heated bed mounts, a 400 W power supply, and a fully assembled electronics case that would allow compatibility with subsequently released dual extruders. Its release was met with reviews praising its new engineering. The TAZ 5 was also rated higher than any other 3D printer on 3D Forged's list of best 3D printers. On June 15, 2014, a film crew from the Canadian-produced television show How It's Made visited the company's headquarters in Loveland, Colorado. There, they filmed a segment featuring the LulzBot TAZ 4 3D printer, which aired in an episode of How It's Made on The Discovery Channel in 2015.

On May 17, 2016, LulzBot released the TAZ 6, which featured such upgrades as, automated bed-leveling, automated nozzle cleaning, and an enclosed power supply, as well as improved firmware, support for new filament materials, a better heat sink, and more. In 3DForged.com's review of the TAZ 6, Brent Hale called the TAZ 6 "the best overall 3D printer I have ever used." However it was the less expensive model, the LulzBot Mini 2 that was named Best Intermediate Printer of the Year for 2019 by Tom's Guide. The Mediahq agreed, naming the Lulzbot Mini 2 the best 3D printer for enthusiasts in 2019.

LulzBot expanded its innovation in the field of 3D printing by using collagen, as collagen makes up every single tissue in the human body. In summer 2019, Carnegie Mellon University created a functional 3D printed human heart tissue utilizing LulzBot's "FRESH" process.

In October 2019, due to cash flow problems, the company laid off 91 out of its 113 employees.

In November 2019, Aleph Objects announced that all of its assets have been acquired by Fargo Additive Manufacturing Equipment 3D (FAME 3D).

Lulzbot 3D printers

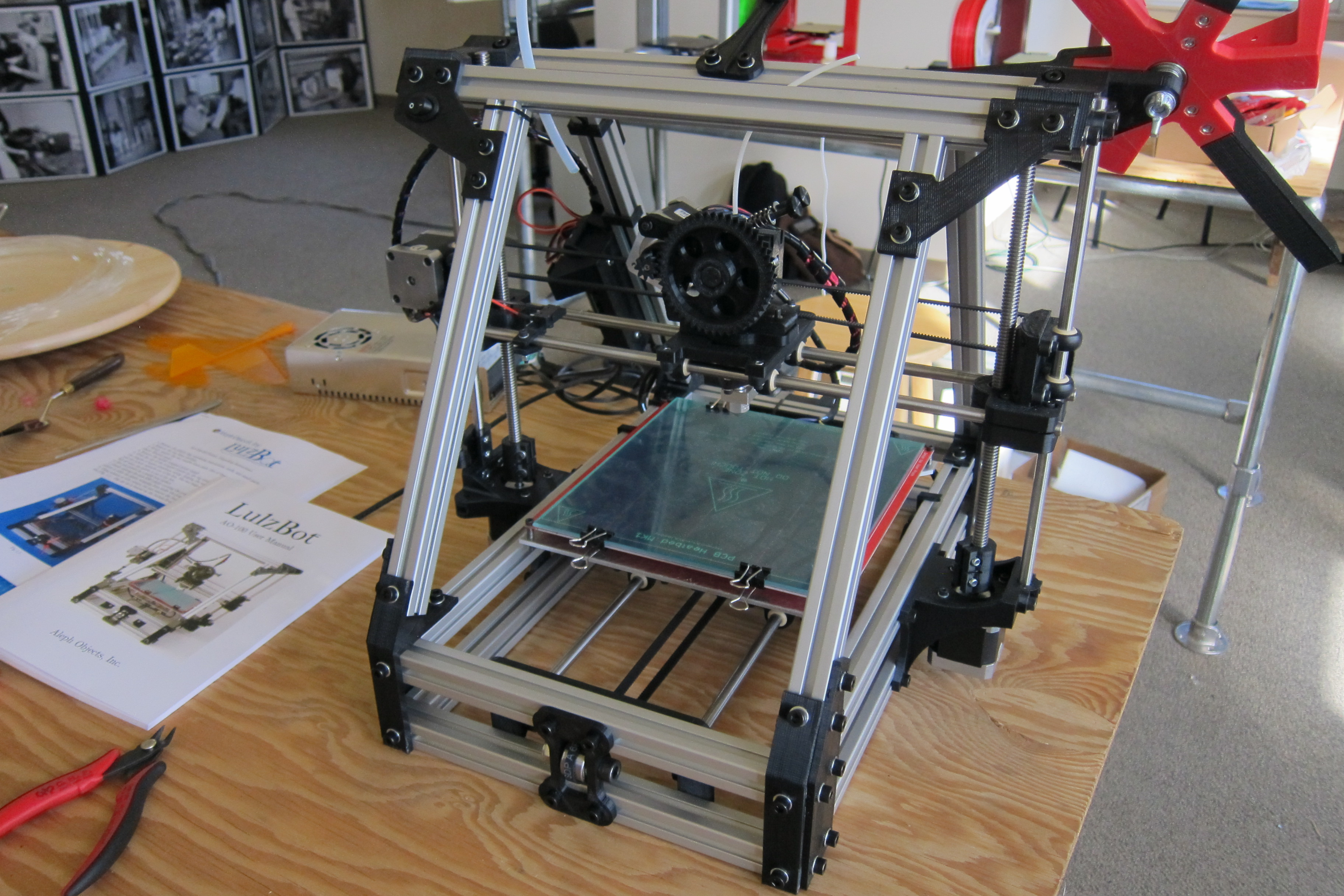
Lulzbot AO-100

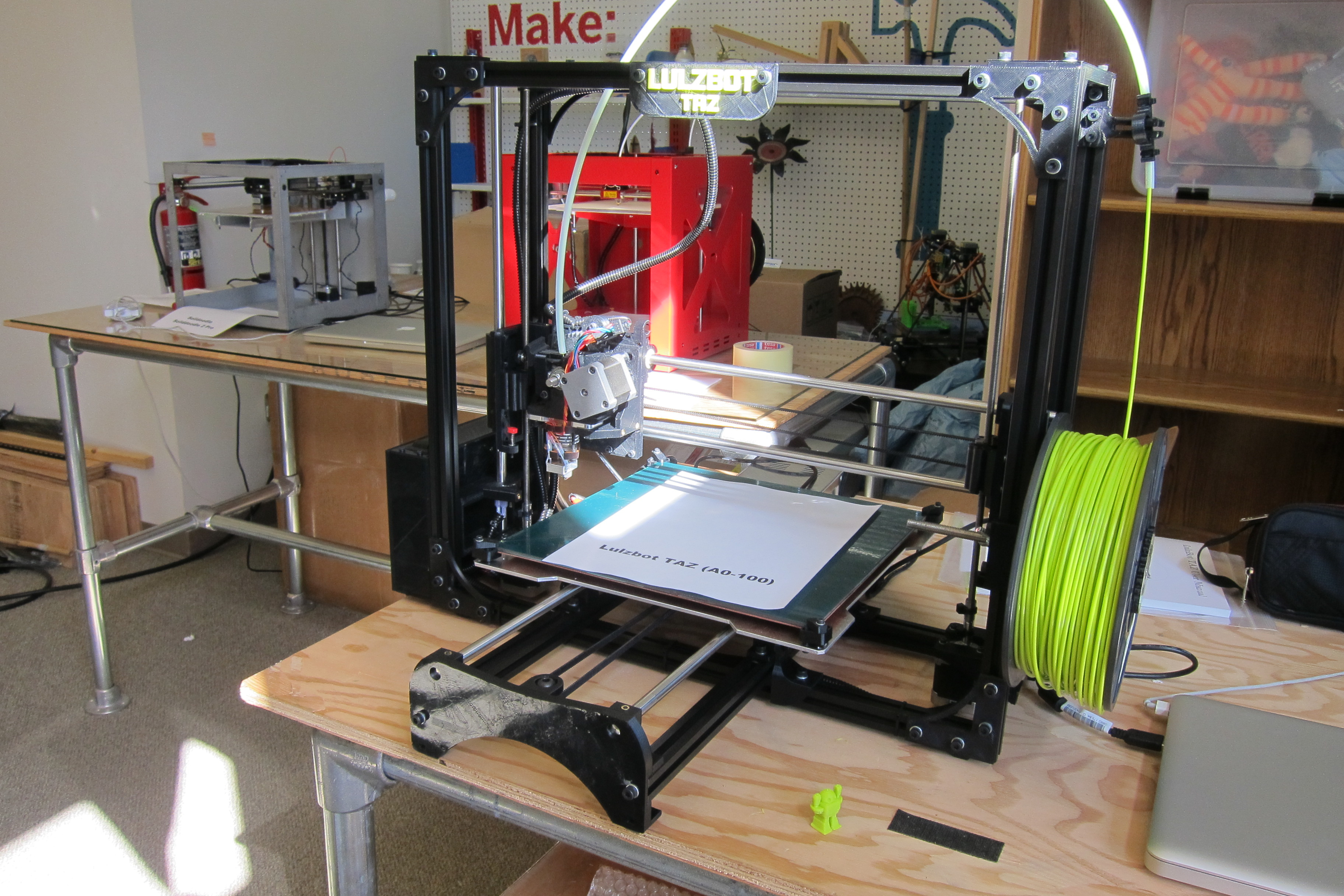
Lulzbot Taz

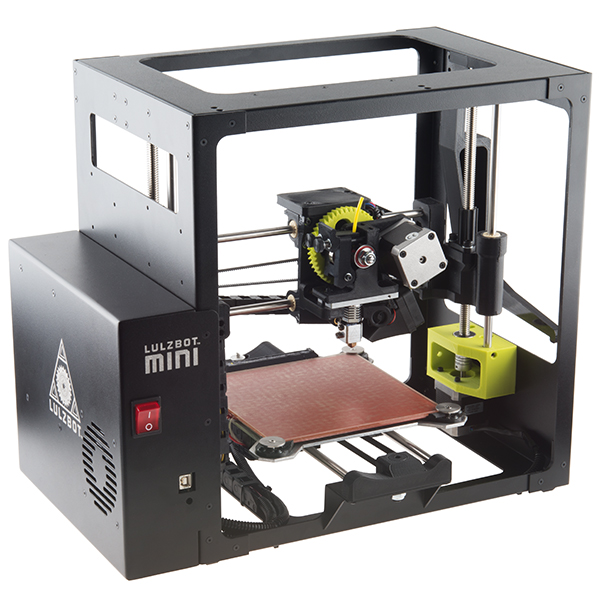
LulzBot Mini

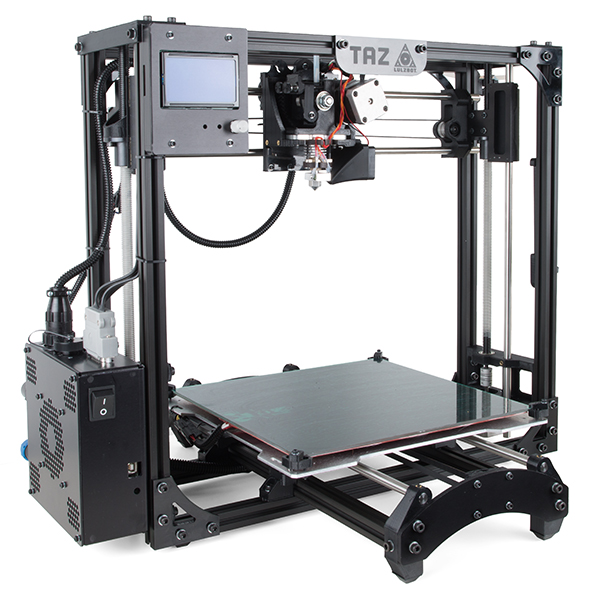
Lulzbot Taz 4

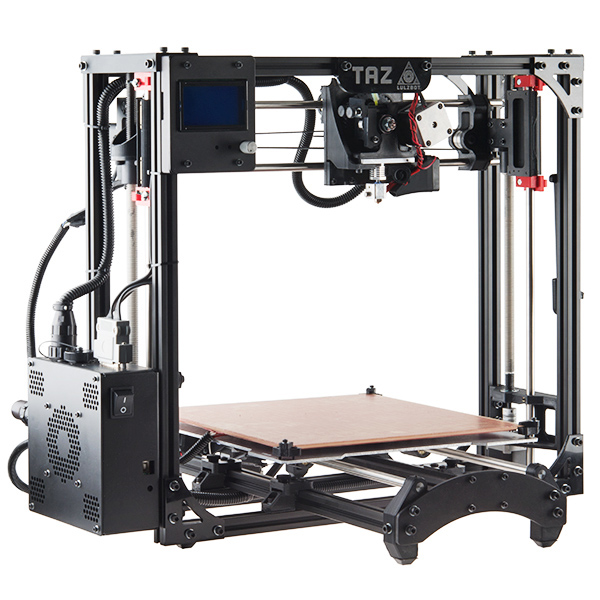
Lulzbot Taz 5

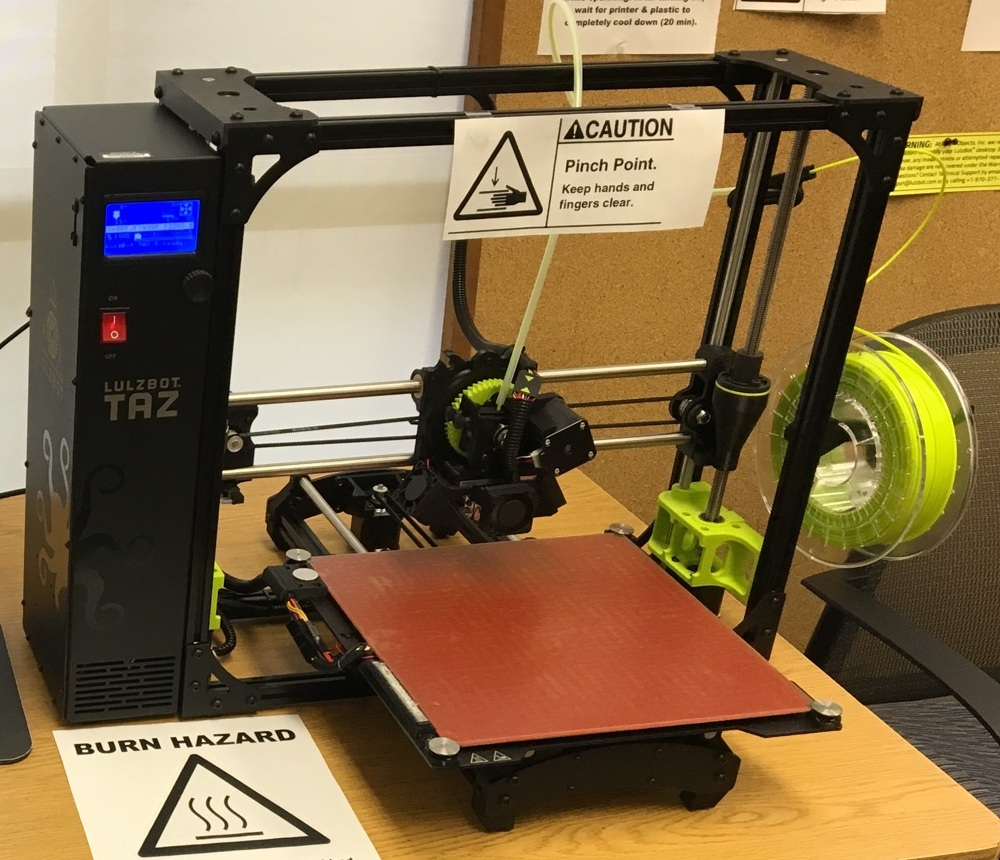
Lulzbot Taz 6

== Other products ==
Aleph Object's business is focused around their line of 3D printers, as such, they also sell plastic filament, printer accessories, and replacement parts.

== See also ==
- List of 3D printer manufacturers
- RepRap Project
- Slic3r
