= 3D printing filament =

Thermoplastic feedstock for 3D printers

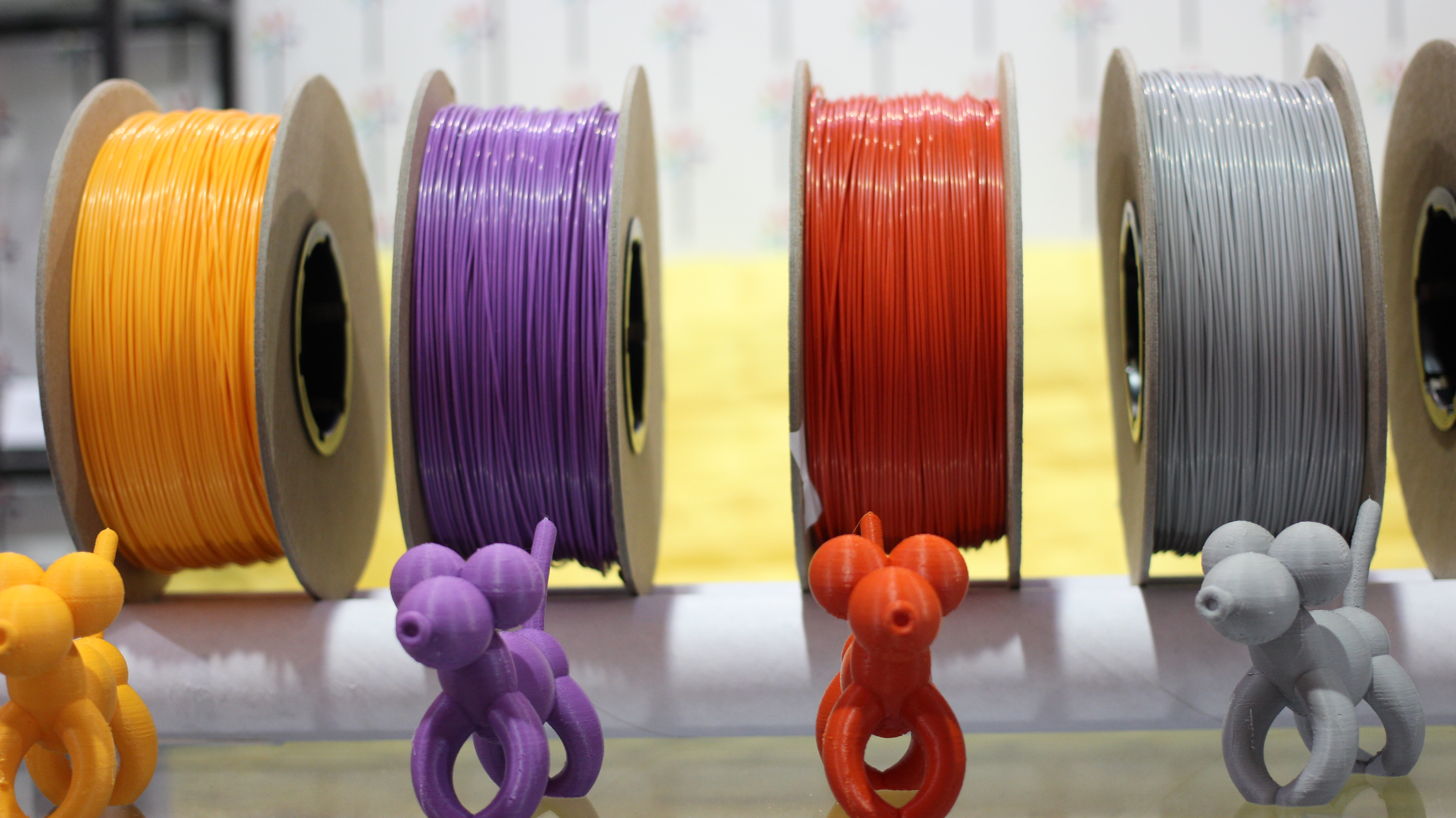
3D printing filament in different colours with models created using the filament.

3D printing filament is the thermoplastic feedstock for fused filament fabrication 3D printers. There are many types of filament available with different properties.

Filament comes in a range of diameters and types, most commonly 1.75 mm and 2.85 mm, with the latter often being confused with the less common 3 mm. The most common materials are PLA (polylactic acid), PETG, and Thermoplastic polyurethane (TPU).

Filament consists of one continuous slender plastic thread spooled into a reel.

== Production ==
3D printing filament is created using a process of heating, extruding and cooling plastic to transform nurdles into the finished product. However, unlike a 3D printer, the filament is pulled rather than pushed through the nozzle to create the filament. The diameter of the filament is defined by the process that takes place after the plastic has been heated rather than the diameter of the extruder nozzle. A different force and speed is applied to the filament as it is pulled out of the extruder to define the width of the filament, most commonly 1.75 mm or 2.85 mm diameter.

=== Commercially produced filament ===
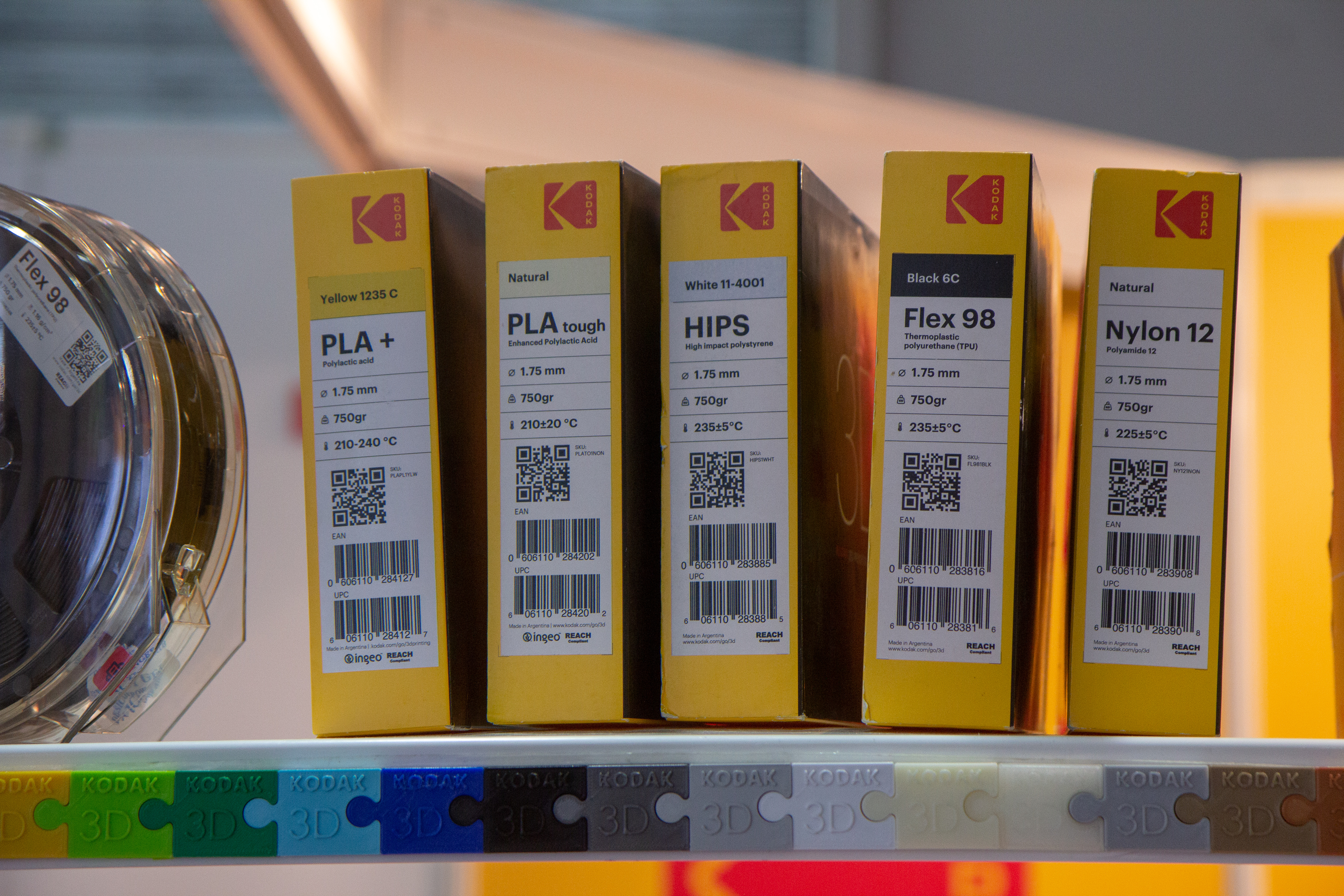
Spools with various types of filament

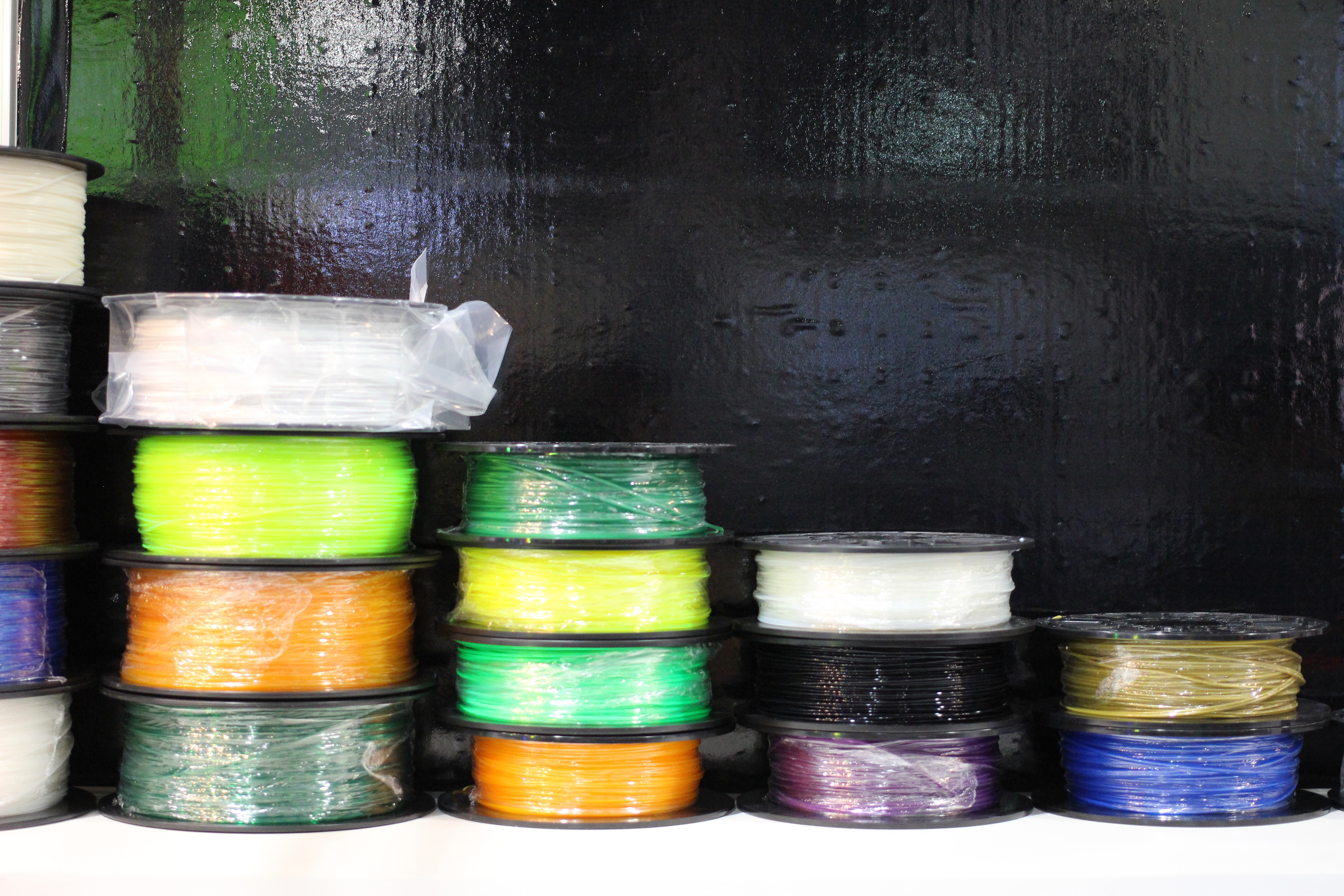
Stacks of commercially produced filament which have been shrink-wrapped to protect the filament from moisture.

In commercial production, the plastic nurdles are always either white or clear. Pigments or other additives are added to the material before it is melted to create coloured filament or filament with special properties, e.g. increased strength or magnetic properties. Before the filament is extruded the nurdles are heated to 80 °C to dry it and reduce water content. The nurdles must be dried, as many thermoplastics are hygroscopic and extrusion of damp plastic causes dimensional flaws (this is also the case when the finished filament is being printed). From there, the nurdles are fed into a single screw extruder where it is heated and extruded into a filament. The diameter is often measured by a laser beam(not melting) as part of a quality control mechanism to ensure correct diameter of the filament. The filament is then fed through a warm water tank which cools the filament which gives the filament its round shape. The filament is then fed through a cold water tank to cool it to room temperature. It is then wound onto a spool to create the finished product.

=== DIY filament production ===
DIY filament production machines use the same method as FDM 3D printers of pushing the filament through the extruder to create the correct diameter filament. There are several DIY filament machines available as both open source plans and commercially available machines.

A food dehydrator can be used to remove water from hygroscopic materials at above 70 °C.

== Usage ==
The process of transforming 3D printing filament into a 3D model is as follows:

1. The filament is fed into the FDM 3D printer
2. The thermoplastic is heated past its glass transition temperature inside the hotend
3. The filament is extruded and deposited by an extrusion head onto a build platform where it cools
4. The process is continuous, building up layers to create the model

== Materials ==
Filament	Special properties	Uses	Strength	Density (kg/m^{3})	Flexi- bility	Dura- bility	Difficulty to print	Print temperature (°C)	Bed temperature (°C)	Printing notes
PLA	Easy to print; Biodegradable, though only in very specific conditions	Consumer Products	Medium	1240	Low	Medium	Low	180–230	No heated bed needed or, 60–80 °C are recommended also	
ABS	Durable; Impact resistant	Functional Parts	Medium	1010	Medium	High	Medium	210–250	50–100	Use enclosed heated chamber at around 40 °C to 60 °C
ABS Carbon Fiber	Increased strength and stiffness then pure ABS	Functional Parts	Medium		Medium	High	Medium	210-260	50-100	
PETG (XT, N‑Vent)	More flexible than PLA or ABS; Durable	All	Medium	1270	High	High	Medium	220–235	No heated bed needed	
PCTG	More flexible than PETG; Durable	All	Medium	1230	High	High	Medium	250–270	90–110	
Nylon	Strong; Flexible; Durable	All	High	1020	High	High	Medium	220–260	50–100	Hygroscopic, keep sealed when not in use
TPE	Extremely flexible; Rubber-like	Elastic Parts; Wearables	Low		High	Medium	High	225–235	40	Print very slowly
TPU	Extremely flexible; Rubber-like	Elastic Parts; Wearables	Low	1200-1240	High	Medium	High	225–235	No heated bed needed	Print slowly
Wood	Wood-like finish	Home Decor	Medium	1400	Medium	Medium	Medium	195–220	No heated bed needed	
HIPS	Dissolvable	Support structures when using ABS on a dual extrusion printer.	Low	1040	Medium	High	Medium	210–250	50–100	
PVA	Dissolvable; Water Soluble; Biodegradable; Oil Resistant	Support structures when using PLA or ABS on a dual extrusion printer.	High		Low	Medium	Low	180–230	No heated bed needed	Hygroscopic, keep sealed when not in use
PET (CEP)	Strong; Flexible; Durable; Recyclable	All	High		High	High	Medium	220–250	No heated bed needed	
PLA Metal	Metal Finish	Jewelry	Medium		Low	High	High	195–220	No heated bed needed	Use hardened nozzle
PLA Carbon Fiber	Rigid; Stronger Than Pure PLA	Functional Parts	Medium		Low	High	Low	195–220	No heated bed needed	Use hardened nozzle
PLA Glass Fiber	Stronger than PLA, weaker than PLA Carbon Fiber	All	Medium		Low	Medium	Low	195-220	No heated bed needed	Use hardened nozzle
Lignin (bioFila)	Biodegradable; Stronger than PLA		Medium		Low	Medium	Low	190–225	55	
Polycarbonate	Very strong; Flexible; Durable; Transparent; Heat Resistant	Functional Parts	High	1180 – 1200	High	High	Medium	270–310	90–105	Use enclosed heated chamber at around 60 °C
Conductive (usually a graphite-plastic blend)	Conductive	Electronics	Medium		Medium	Low	Low	215–230	No heated bed needed	Use hardened nozzle
Wax (MOLDLAY)	Melts Away	Lost wax Casting	Low		Low	Low	Low	170–180	No heated bed needed	
PETT (T‑Glase)	Strong; Flexible; Transparent; Clear	Functional Parts	High		High	High	Medium	235–240	No heated bed needed	
ASA	Rigid; Durable; Weather Resistant	Outdoor	Medium	1070	Low	High	Medium	240–260	100–120	
PP	Flexible; Chemical Resistance	Flexible Components	Medium	1040	High	Medium	High	210–230	120–150	
POM, Acetal	Strong; Rigid; Low Friction; Resilient	Functional Parts	High		Low	Medium	High	210–225	130	
PMMA, Acrylic	Rigid; Durable; Transparent; Clear; Impact Resistant	Light diffusers	Medium		Low	High	Medium	235–250	100–120	
Sandstone (LAYBRICK; styled plastic)	Sandstone Finish	Architecture	Low		Low	Low	Medium	165–210	No heated bed needed	
Glow-In-The-Dark plastic	Phosphorescence	Fun	Medium		Medium	Medium	Low	215	No heated bed needed	Use hardened nozzle
Cleaning	Cleaning	Unclogging of Nozzles	N/A		N/A	N/A	Low	150–260	No heated bed needed	
PC-ABS	Rigid; Durable; Impact Resistant; Resilient; Deflecting Heat	Functional Parts	Medium		Low	High	High	260–280	120	
Magnetic (PLA blend)	Magnetic	Fun	Medium		Medium	Medium	High	195–220	No heated bed needed	
Color Changing (plastic blend)	Thermochromism	Fun	Medium		Medium	Medium	Low	215	No heated bed needed	
nGen (co-polyester)	Similar to PETG; Heat Resistant; Transparent	All	Medium		High	High	Medium	210–240	60	
TPC	Extremely Flexible; Rubber-Like; Chemical resistant; Heat resistant; UV light resistant	Elastic Parts; Outdoor	Low		High	Medium	High	210	60–100	
PORO-LAY	Partially Water Soluble	Experimental	Low		High	Medium	Low	220–235	No heated bed needed	
FPE	Flexible	Flexible Parts	Low		High	High	Medium	205–250	75	
PEI (Ultem)	Heat Resistant; Strong; Flame Performance	Functional Parts	High	1270	Medium	High	Medium	340–380	180–200	Use enclosed heated chamber at 220 °C
PPS	Heat Resistant; Strong; Flame Performance	Functional Parts	High	1350-1360	High	Medium	High	300–370	100–160	Use enclosed heated chamber at 65 °C to 90 °C
PEEK	Heat Resistant; Strong; Flame Performance	Functional parts	High	1300-1320	High	Medium	High	360–450	100–160	Use enclosed heated chamber at 70 °C to 200 °C
PEKK	Heat Resistant; Strong; Flame Performance; Chemical resistance	Functional parts, aerospace, high-temperature applications	High	1320-1360	Medium	High	High	370–450	120–180	Use enclosed heated chamber at 80 °C to 200 °C

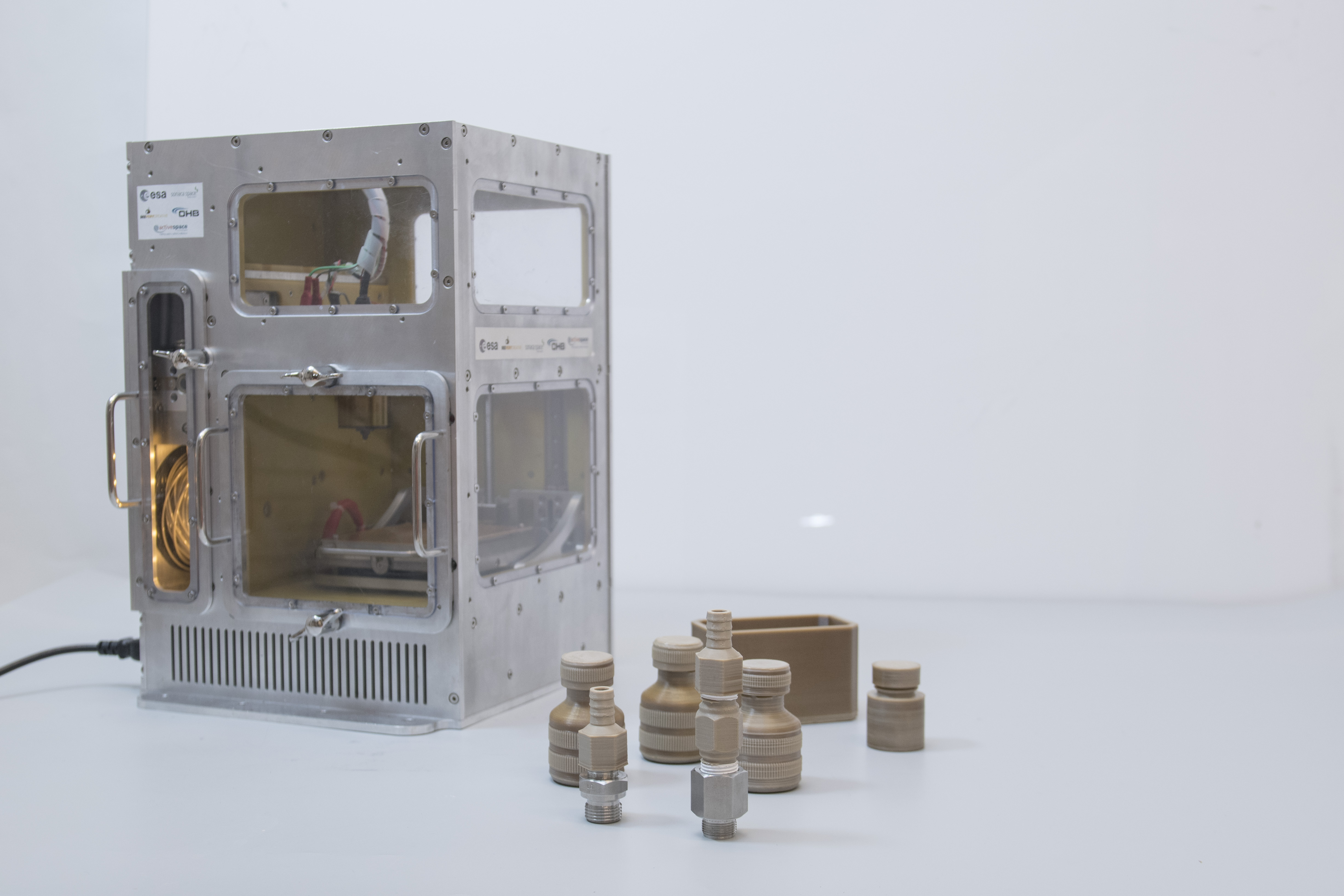
ESA's Manufacturing of Experimental Layer Technology (MELT) 3D printer can print polyether ether ketone (PEEK)
