= MatterHackers =

3D printing products company

- Type: Private
- Industry: 3D printing
- Founded: September 2012
- Founder: Lars Brubaker, Kevin Pope, and Michael Hulse
- Headquarters: Lake Forest, California, United States
- Website: matterhackers.com

MatterHackers is an Orange County-based company founded in 2012 that supplies and sells 3D printing materials and tools. MatterHackers is developing their 3D printer control software, MatterControl.

== History ==
MatterHackers was founded in 2012, and provides both an online and physical, retail presence for customers. MatterHackers was an exhibitor at the World Maker Faire New York 2013.

== MatterControl ==
MatterControl is MatterHacker's software for 3D printers. "MatterControl is free software for organizing and managing 3D print jobs, with integrated slicing." MatterHackers has stated that while they may provide additional features as paid plug-ins, MatterControl at its core will remain free. MatterControl currently has a stable build that receives updates and patches from the development team. It has stable builds for Windows, Mac and Linux platforms. It has stable builds for Windows, Mac and Linux platforms. The latest released version is 2.0.

MatterControl Touch was launched in 2015. This is a product that is a 3D printer controller including onboard slicing, remote monitoring, and automatic print leveling. In 2016 MatterHackers launched an updated, and larger version of MatterControl Touch called MatterControl T10

== Services ==
MatterHackers also supplies customers with 3D printing goods. In June 2013, MatterHackers opened their own retail location in Lake Forest, California where they sell 3D printing supplies, parts, and accessories. They currently produce their own 3D printer, the Pulse and the Pulse XE (which is designed to work specifically with Nylon and NylonX filament - but it can print all filaments.)

The shop also carries 3D printers made by other companies.

== Products ==
MatterHackers offers a variety of material selections, and filaments, but is known for their own PRO series brand. Materials carried include:

- PRO Series PLA
- PRO Series ABS
- PRO Series PETG
- NylonX
- PRO Series Nylon (Available in multiple colors)
- ColorFabb
- Fillamentum
- NinjaTek
- Taulman 3D
- Kai Parthy's LAY Series
- Ultimaker Materials
- 3D Fuel
- PolyMaker
- Proto-Pasta
- 3DXTech
- Dupont
- Raise3D Filaments

== See also ==
- 3D Printing
