= Voron Design =

3D printer design nonprofit organization

- Type: Open-source project
- Industry: 3D printing
- Founded: 2015
- Founder: Maksim Zolin
- Area served: Worldwide
- Products: Voron 0, Voron 1, Voron 2, Voron 2.4 , Voron Trident
- Services: Open-source 3D printer designs
- Website: vorondesign.com

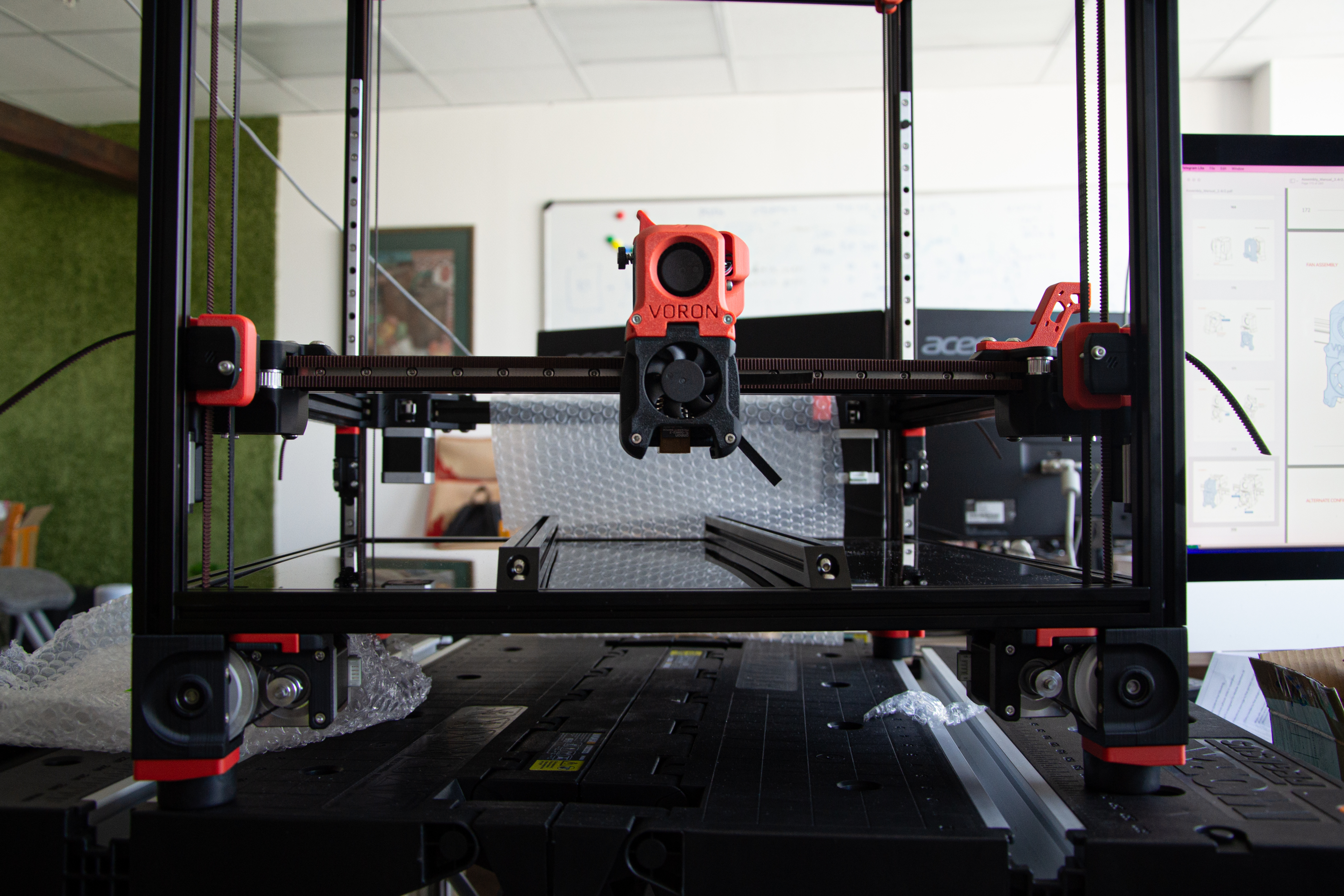
Voron 2.4 is a modern 3D printer with CoreXY, stepper motors in open-loop control and with the open-source firmware Klipper that introduced input shaping

Voron Design is a nonprofit organization that develops specifications for free and open hardware. They have developed specifications for several 3D printers and have been described as a revival of the RepRap project. In 2025 over 15 000 printers had been built.

Users typically assemble the parts themselves from bill of materials or kits from third-party suppliers. The open specifications and extensive use of off-the-shelf products make the printers highly maintainable, modular, and expandable. This provides great flexibility in configuration, no lock-in to proprietary systems, and good repairability.

The project helped popularize CoreXY printers (along with other open source projects such as the Rat Rig V-Core, HevORT and VzBot 330 and later 235), and has greatly influenced commercial printer designs. The companies Sovol and Fombot have implemented the designs in the Sovol SV08 and Troodon 2.0 (Voron 2.4 clones) and Sovol Zero (Voron 0.2 clone). The project has also led to increased use and development of the Klipper firmware, which has added new techniques for high-speed printing such as input shaping and pressure advance, as well as broader support for more microcontrollers.

== History ==
The Voron project was started by Russian Maksim Zolin (pseudonym russiancatfood, RCF) who wanted a better, faster, and quieter 3D printer. He built a printer and started the company MZ-Bot based on open source ideology.

In 2015, the Voron Geared Extruder was released as the first design to use the Voron name. In 2015, Zolin sold the first 18 printers as kits (Voron 1.0, later renamed Voron Trident, and quite similar to the later Voron Legacy), and marked them with serial numbers. In March 2016, the first Voron printer was publicly released via the company MZ-Bot.

The V24 was an experimental model with a build volume of 24×24×24" (610×610×610 mm). Only two were built, laying the foundation for the later Voron2. By February 2019, over 100 Voron2 printers had been built and assigned serial numbers, and a year later in 2020, the number had increased to 350 Voron2 printers. The Voron2.0 was never officially launched.

Zolin found that he did not want to run a company and instead decided to release his work fully to the outside world, inviting others to collaborate with him. The tradition of marking new builds with serial numbers has lived on, and users who build their own Voron printer can be assigned their own serial number as proof of the hard work they have put into sourcing parts, assembling, and configuring the printer.

In May 2020, Voron2.4 was launched, and over 2,500 printers were registered with serial numbers before the 2.4R2 version was launched in February 2022. In 2021, Voron Trident was launched. Voron 0.2 has also achieved great popularity.

== Models ==
The project has evolved into several models targeting different use cases. All designs are released under open licenses so that users can build, modify, and improve upon the designs. Some popular models include the Voron 0.2, Voron 2.4, and Voron Trident, all of which are CoreXY filament printers.

Some well-known specifications include:

- Voron 1: Original design from around 2015–2016. Build volume of 250×250×230 mm (V1.8), bed-dropper build plate, CoreXY, open chamber.
- Voron 0 / 0.1 / 0.2: A CoreXY designed to be compact, portable and very fast due to a rigid frame and short belts, with a build volume of only 120×120×120 mm.
  - Voron 0 has belt-driven z-axis and a Bowden extruder.
  - Voron 0.1 (launched 2021) is a significant upgrade with easier assembly, direct-drive extruder, simpler electronics and a heated bed, but at the cost of some increase in the printer's height
  - Voron 0.2 (launched 2023) is a further development with hinged top-cover, new standard tool head and new linear rails
- Voron 2.4: Launched in May 2020. Distinguishes itself from most other CoreXY designs by having a flying gantry frame and fixed build plate. The support frame is vertically controlled by four motors for automatic tramming. Build volumes of 250³, 300³ or 350³ mm.
- Voron Trident: Launched 2021. Fixed gantry and bed-dropper build plate with automatic three-point leveling (hence the name) through z-tilt. Simpler design than Voron 2.4 with fewer parts, and more similar to the original. Build volume of 250³, 300³ or 350³ mm.
- Voron Switchwire: Modification of Mendel / Prusa i3 / Ender 3 that converts from Cartesian to CoreXZ kinematics with linear rails and belts. Build volume of 250×210×210 mm.
- Voron Legacy: Nostalgic project to recreate the spirit of the first Voron 1.0 printers. Build volume of 230×230×240 mm. Simpler design with open chamber, cylindrical rods instead of linear rails, but with the modern Afterburner tool head.
- Voron Phoenix: Ongoing development project to create a large-scale printer (the size of a Rat Rig V-Core). A prototype from 2023 had a build volume of 600×600×600 mm. One of the current research problems (revision 705) is gantry expansion of up to 2 mm during prints requiring expansion joints.
- Voron Cascade: Ongoing development project to create a CNC milling machine.
- Doron Velta: Not an official Voron printer, but a printer that started as a joke since it was assumed the Voron team did not want to develop a delta printer. Doron Velta construction kits are offered by Fysetc.
- Voron Micron: Not an official Voron printer, but a scaled-down Voron 2.4 developed by the Printers for Ants project. Kits are available from several suppliers. The original Micron prints up to 120×120×120 mm (the same build volume as the Voron 0.2), but the more common Micron+ (or R1) is slightly larger at 180×180×180 mm. It uses 1515 T-slot profiles similar to the Voron 0.2.

== Modifications ==
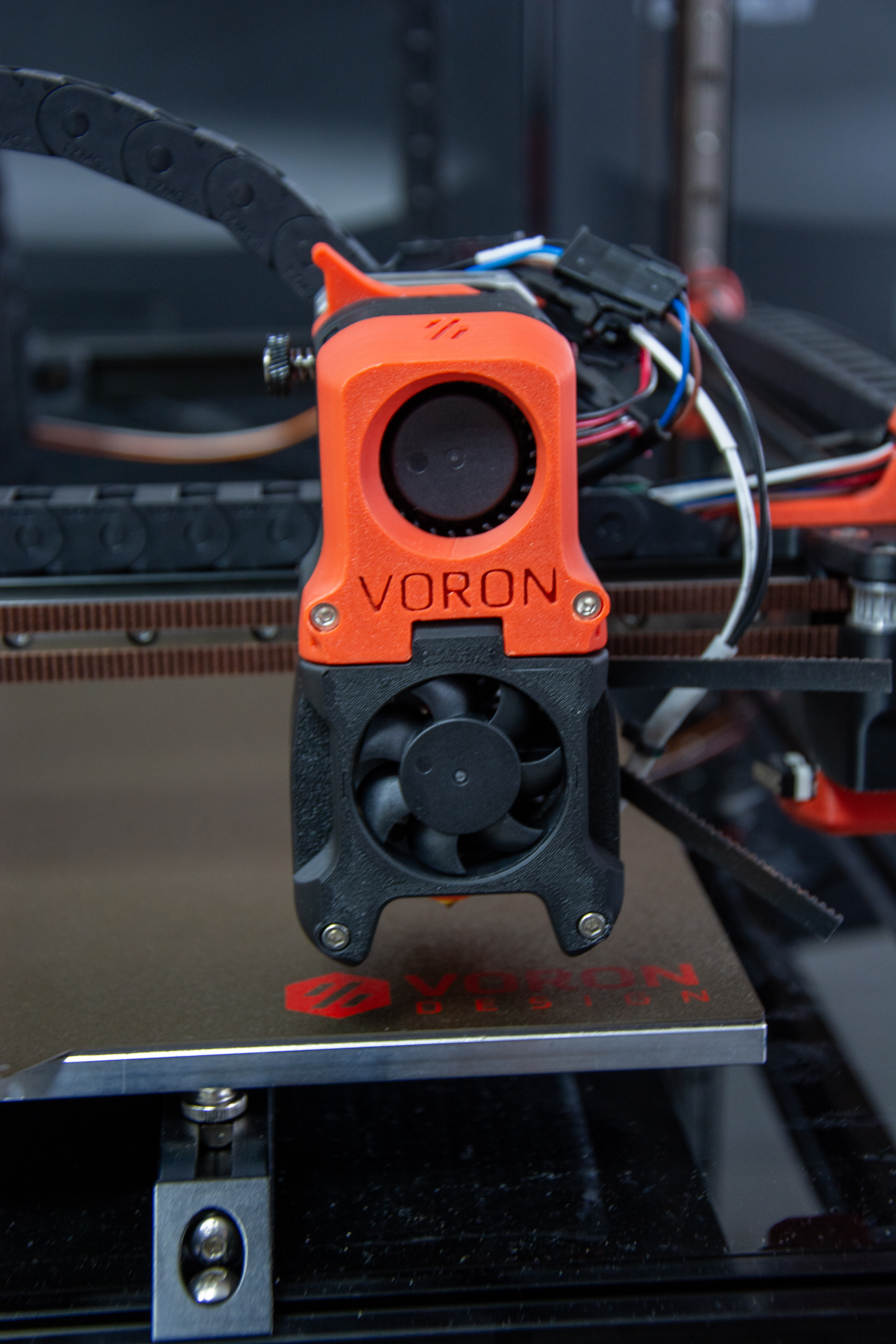
Toolhead on a Voron 2.4, here with a hotend and direct-drive extruder

An active user community maintains specifications, shares experiences, improvements and modifications. This contributes to continuous development and improvement, and there are several types of adaptations, extensions and further developments.

Popular modifications include:

- Toolheads: The main assembly that moves during printing, including the extruder, hotend and cooling fan. Toolhead selection is about optimizing performance, cost, and ensuring that it physically and electronically fits with other hardware (such as motor mounts, probes, and any tool-changer). For higher speed, acceleration, and better input shaping it is beneficial to have less moving mass and a shorter fulcrum distance from the center of mass to the center of rotation. The following is an excerpt from some of the most well-known (from around 40) common toolheads.
  - Official toolheads from Voron Design:
    - Afterburner: The original modular system, with extruder, toolhead which holds the hotend and cooling fans that are interchangeable parts. Rarely used in new builds nowadays.
    - Stealthburner: Current standard for 2.4 and Trident. Supports Voron Tap (nozzle-based automatic tramming) and Clockwork 2 (filament feeding). Integrated lighting.
    - Mini-Stealthburner: Specially designed for Voron V0. Compact and efficient for small printers.
  - Performance-oriented toolheads:
    - Dragonburner: Modular, low weight, relatively easy assembly and very good cooling which is beneficial for higher speed and accelerations. Fits everything from the smallest Voron 0 to 2.4.
    - A4T: Stiffer and with better cooling than Dragonburner, but also heavier and more complex.
    - Xol: Even better performance in terms of speed and volumetric flow than Dragonburner, but more complex (also compared to A4T). Lower weight and more powerful cooling due to external cooling fan via CPAP.
    - Several others such as Archetype, yavoth, etc.
  - Specialized tooheads:
    - Rapidburner: Length-extended Dragonburner to support faster hotends such as Rapido UHF (ultra high flow).
    - Anthead: Compact, but must be assembled while on the rail, making it more difficult to maintain.
    - Several others.
- Extruders: Motor and gear pushing the filament.
  - Clockwork (CW1/CW2): The original and standard extruder from Voron Design, based on two hobbed gears and a compact NEMA 17 motor (CW1) or NEMA14 motor (CW2).
  - Galileo/Galileo 2: Newer design using planetary gears to reduce mass and size.
  - Several others.
- Hotend: Melts the filament, and must fit the print head in terms of mounting and fan placement. Important factors include maximum flow rate, material compatibility, nozzle options, price, and maintenance such as easy replacement of nozzle and heater cartridge, and thermistor replacement with or without thermal paste. Some nozzle mounts are open/standard (such as V6 nozzles with M6 threads), while others are proprietary (such as E3D Revo or Phaetus Rapido). Not all hotends can print all materials (for example, hardened nozzles should be used for hard materials, and not all hotends can print softer materials such as TPU).
  - Flow rates are available in standard, high (HF) or ultra-high flow (UHF) variants, with the main difference being the longer melt zone. Higher flow rates allow faster writing, but can more easily lead to stringing (dragging of thin threads) caused by oozing (dripping/slurring from the nozzle). This can be adjusted away, but may require more adjustment with hotends designed for high flow rates, and standard nozzles are therefore considered more reliable and easier to calibrate.
- Modifications for toolheads includes:
  - Powerful cooling: CPAP fan
  - Multi-material printing:
    - Tool-changer: Stealtchanger, Tapchanger, MadMax,
    - Nozzle-changer: Bondtech INDX
    - Filament changer (for using several different materials or filaments in the same nozzle): Enraged Rabbit Carrot Feeder (ERCF), BoxTurtle
    - Several extruders simultaneously: Independent dual extruder (IDEX), independent quad extruder (IQEX)
- Height probes: Automatic scanning and mesh compensation for unevenness in the print surface (mechanical probes such as BLTouch / CR Touch, inductive probes, capacitive probes, optical/IR probes (Tap), strain gauge/piezo probes, microswitches, optical scanning with Beacon or Cartographer 3D, or eddy current probes)
- Homing: Mechanical microswitches, magnetic Hall-effect switches or sensorless homing using stall torque sensing in the motor drivers
- Motors and motor drivers with standard 12 V, or higher voltage for better acceleration and less noise (24 V or 48 V). Open-loop steppers dominate due to simplicity, but there is some developments into closed-loop stepper motors or servo motors, for example using field-oriented control for less noise, vibration, heat and failure recovery.
- More motors, for example 4 xy motors (called 4WD or AWD) instead of 2 to get shorter belts for less stretch, or 6WD which is similar to 4WD but also has 2 extra y motors
- Motor mounts with double shear support (shaft supported in two locations rather than one) for tighter belts
- Belts: 9 mm belts instead of 6 mm for less belt stretch, live shaft idlers for larger bearings
- Gantry: Lighter gantry (carbon fiber, titanium, lightened aluminium or steel), gantry with center of mass at belt-height (VzBot, Mammoth, Monolith, LDO AWD, Rigid Metal Gantry), y rails on the inside of the gantry
- Corner joints: The most common way to connect the frame is using blind joints (considered strong, simple and cost efficient), but other less popular options include using corner cubes (such as those from Misumi or OpenBuilds, simpler to install but less rigid) or using angle brackets such as on the Rat Rig V-Core.
- Additional bracing: Corner bracing or cross bracing, reinforced brackets of metal (CNC)
- Frame: Extra z-height for better room for tool-changer or nozzle-changer. Non square print surface, for example 300×400 mm (same belt length as 350×350 mm).
- Controller cards: BTT Octopus, Spider, SKR, Fysetc Spider, and so on
- CAN bus or USB for simpler cabling
- Inverted electronics and pull-out electronics for easier access for maintenance
- Filtering and extractor fan: Nevermore, The Filter, Schmilter
- Cabinet: Panels and lighting, doors with different types of hinges, insulation for higher temperature printing (for example Doomcube 4040/4020)

== See also ==
- CoreXY, technique for two-dimensional motion control
- Klipper (firmware), open source firmware for 3D printers that is distributed between a computer and a microcontroller
- List of open-source hardware projects
- Open-source hardware, hardware whose design documents are openly available to and can be modified by others
- OpenStructures, an open specification for modular interfaces in hardware based on a geometric grid
- Raspberry Pi, a single-board computer the size of a credit card
