= Tramming =

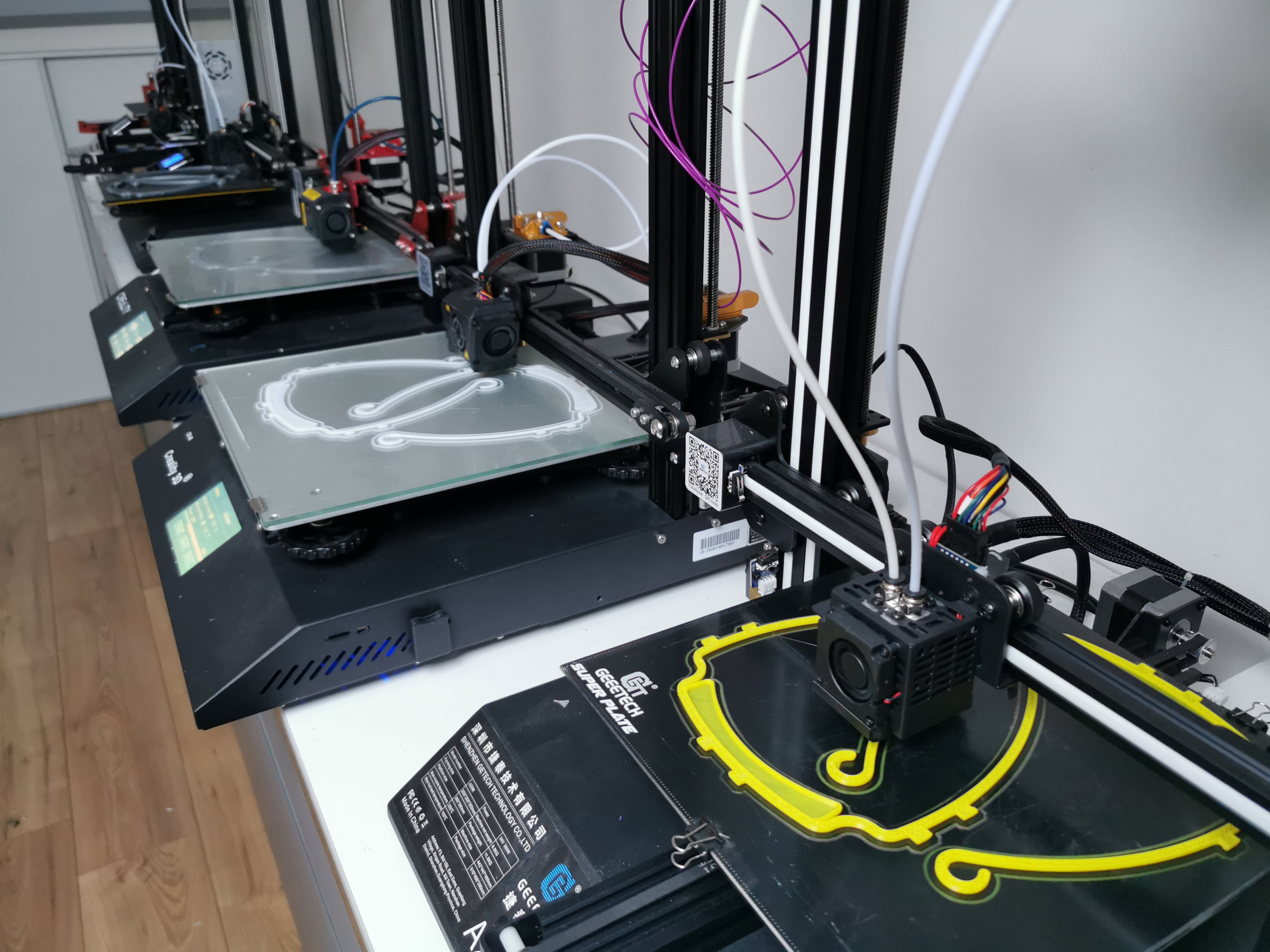
Tramming and mesh compensation are especially important on filament printers to ensure good adhesion of the first layer

Tramming is the adjustment of two planes or axis so that they are parallel or orthogonal (perpendicular) to each other. It is important in machine tools to ensure smooth processing of the workpiece.

Sometimes tramming is erroneously referred to as "bed leveling", which means adjusting something orthogonally to a gravitational field. This is a misnomer, since tramming, however, is only about the internal geometry of a machine. That is, none of the surfaces in the machine need be horizontal or vertical according to the gravitational field as long as they are parallel or orthogonal to each other. Confusing the two can produce undesirable results.

== Machining ==
In machining, such as on a milling machine or router, tramming may involve aligning the spindle orthogonally to the coordinate table. This can provide better accuracy by ensuring flatter cuts, preventing slanted or angled cuts, or uneven surfaces that can result from a tilted or "out-of-tram" spindle. The error is particularly noticeable with large diameter cutting tools. Special tools are available with two dial indicators mounted at a distance from the spindle axis to facilitate tramming.

== 3D printing ==
In planar 3D printing, especially for filament printers, tramming involves aligning the carrier frame and build plate in relation to each other to ensure flat printing. This can be done by measuring (directly or indirectly) the distance from the nozzle to the print surface at several points, and possibly correcting mechanically and/or compensating in software (so-called mesh compensation). It is often desirable to first align the printer as much as possible mechanically, and then let the software compensate for any remaining misalignment. If the mechanics are too misaligned, the software may not be able to compensate. Some printers are calibrated from the factory, and should only need to be manually trammed if they have become very out of alignment.

Indications of the need for tramming may include the first layer not adhering evenly or hanging well on the build surface, the workpiece bulging (especially for PLA), varying spacing between filament lines on the build surface, or the height and width of the filament changing across the build surface.

The first layer's distance from the surface (z-offset) should be neither too low nor too high

The build plate and the support frame should be as parallel to each other as possible

No build plate or support frame will be perfectly straight, and mesh compensation can be used to compensate for concave and convex conditions

=== Mechanical tramming ===
Mechanical alignment can be done in several ways depending on the printer's kinematics and possibilities of adjustment.

- Printers with a bed slinger may have spring-loaded screws at each corner to allow the user to manually tram the bed. (Some newer printers have moved away from springs and replaced them with stiffer bushings or software compensation.)
- Printers with a bed dropper may have the ability to individually adjust the lead screws in each corner (bed tramming). The Rat Rig V-Core 3 is an example of a printer with very large adjustment possibilities, so large that it can be considered a 5-axis printer instead of a 3-axis printer.
- Printers with a flying gantry are trammed by adjusting the gantry (gantry tramming). For example, on a Voron 2.4 this is done by individually adjusting the four z-belts.

=== Measurement ===
For good first-layer adhesion, it is important that the printer is able to measure and compensate for irregularities in the build plate. According to Klipper, the printer surface should be calibrated to within 25 microns (0.025 mm), which is significantly smaller than a typical human hair. Subtle effects such as thermal expansion will affect measurements of this magnitude, and probing and tramming should therefore be done when the printer is warmed up.

Manual tramming can be done with a regular A4 paper or sticky note or feeler gauge.

Z-probes are used to electronically measure the height of the nozzle(s) relative to the print bed. There are several good methods for probing, several of which utilize the printer's own motion system. No one type dominates, and they vary in cost, ability to deliver reliability, simplicity, and accuracy. Most use either some form of proximity sensor or mechanical switch. Some Z-probes are also used for homing, which is moving the mechanical system to a reference position (or offset) before starting a print (which is a separate issue from tramming).

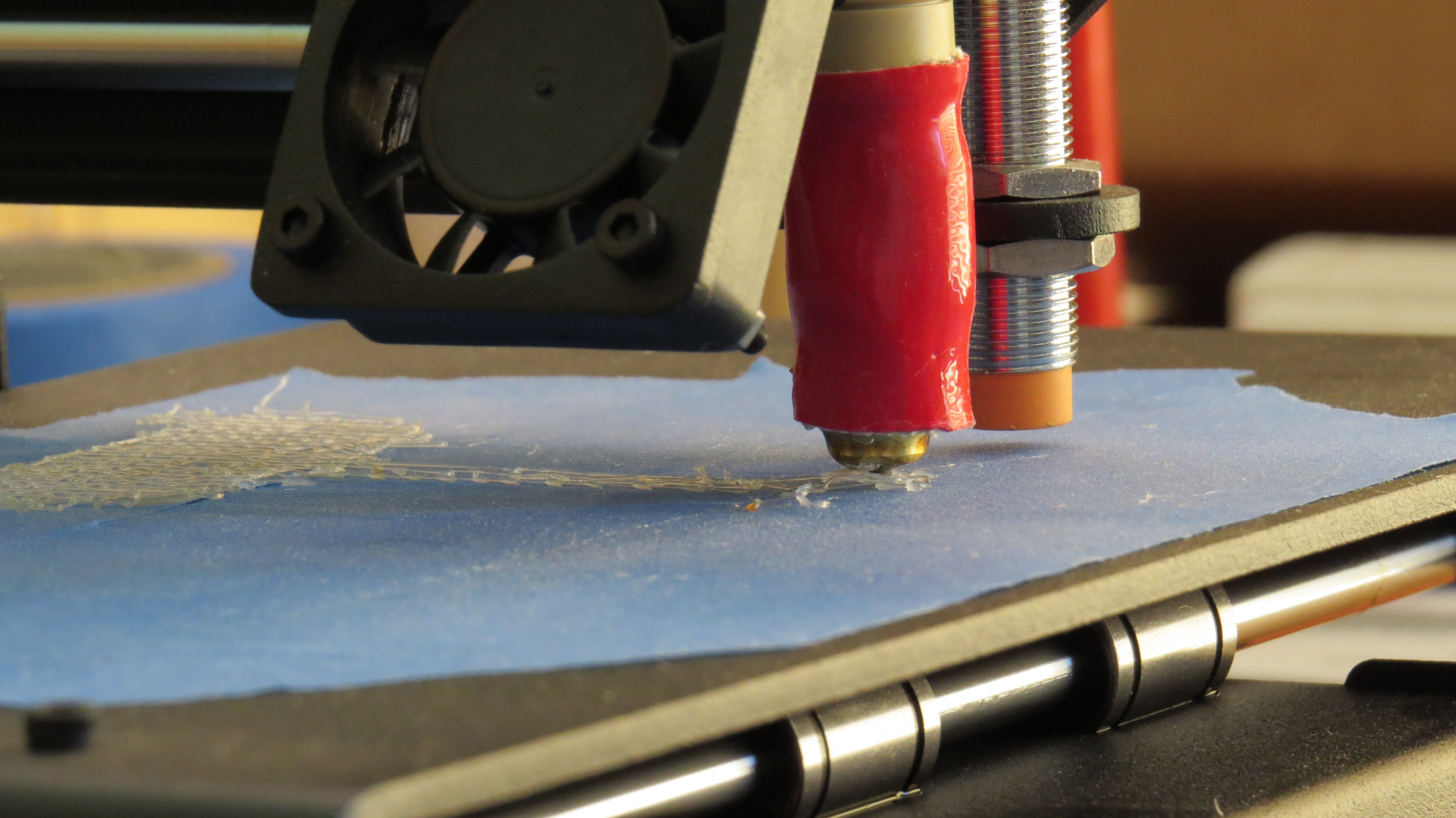
Inductive or capacitive probe with an orange tip

Common types of automatic Z-probes are:

- Microswitch: Electronically simple, but often requires a mechanism to lower it below nozzle height and raise it back up before printing.
- Inductive: Triggers when it comes close to electrically conductive material. When it triggers depends on the sensor and the plate. Works on metal plates with thin coatings, but may struggle with glass plates.
- Capacitive: Similar in practice to inductive probes, but has the ability to detect and trigger on glass plates.
- Eddy current: Different design from traditional inductive probes, and has the ability to scan large areas quickly. Provides a measurement value relatively proportional to distance, as opposed to a binary on/off signal as with traditional inductive probes. Also has the ability to detect when the nozzle hits the print plate, because the distance measurement then stops changing. Linearity and temperature sensitivity can be challenges.
- Optical (reflection of light, infrared light, or lidar): Sends light towards a printing plate and measures the intensity of the returned light. Simple variants can be affected by daylight and indoor lighting, but differential sensors are less affected. Works on most types of printing plates. Bambu Lab uses lidar.
- Nozzle probes: Detects that the nozzle is in direct contact with the plate. An advantage is that the distance between the nozzle and the plate is checked directly, eliminating the need to adjust the height when changing the nozzle or plate. The method requires that the nozzle be free of hardened plastic that protrudes and can affect the height measurement, and the nozzle should therefore be heated and brushed off before tramming. There is a risk that the nozzle will scratch the plate if it is in contact during lateral movement.
  - Voron Tap: The entire toolhead moves to trigger an optical switch. With contact pressure equivalent to 500–800 grams, it is only suitable for printers with rigid construction and a robust printing surface. Voron recommends spring steel printing plates, while plates covered with polyetherimide (PEI) can get burn marks over time.
  - Switch nozzle contact
  - Electrical contact
    - Puck
  - Force-sensitive resistor
  - Piezoelectric
  - Accelerometer
- Sensorless Z-homing: Some stepper motor drivers can detect when the motor is approaching stalling to prevent the motor from skipping steps. This functionality can also be used to detect when the nozzle contacts the build plate, and is used on several printers (like for example the Prusa Mini).

== See also ==
- Calibration, check on the accuracy of measurement devices
- Metrology, science of measurement and its application
