= Voron =

Voron may refer to:

- Voron (surname)
- Voron, Crimea, a village in the Sudak municipality
- Voron, Vologda Oblast, a rural locality in Kaduysky District, Russia
- Voron Design, nonprofit organization developing specifications for free and open hardware
  - Voron 2.4, an open-source 3D printer
- Tupolev Voron, a planned Soviet supersonic unmanned reconnaissance aircraft
