= Rat Rig =

Portuguese manufacturer of 3D printers

- Industry: 3D printing
- Founded: 2014; 11 years ago in Portugal
- Headquarters: Faro District, Portugal
- Products: 3D printers, CNC machines
- Website: ratrig.com

Rat Rig is a Portuguese manufacturer of modular 3D printers and CNC machines based on structural aluminum profiles. They are known for their V-Core series of 3D printers, which are CoreXY printers with open source and open hardware. Along with Voron and VzBot, Rat Rig has been one of the pioneers in the commercialization of 3D printers with CoreXY kinematics, a printer type that has since been adopted by major commercial players such as Prusa, Creality, Bambu Lab, and others. Rat Rig has distinguished itself in that their printers can be constructed relatively large, with build volumes of up to 500×500×500 mm, compared to, for example, 250×210×210 mm for the reference printer Prusa i3 or 350×350×350 mm for the (also relatively large) Voron 2.4.

They have stated that they are committed to open design principles, using mainly standard or modular components that give users the freedom to modify or upgrade their products. They share technical drawings and bill of materials, among other things.

== History ==
The company Rat Rig was founded in 2014, initially focusing on manufacturing camera dollies for film and video production. They have since become a leading company in the 3D printing industry.

In 2022, Rat Rig won the 3D Printing Industry Award for Company of the Year in the personal printer category. They were ranked in the top 5% of small and medium enterprises in Portugal in 2023 and 2024. In 2024, the V-Core 4 was nominated for the 3D Printing Industry Awards' Desktop FFF 3D Printer of the Year.

== V-Core ==
The Rat Rig V-Core is a modular and flexible design. It is offered either as a kit complete with all the necessary parts, or with some parts omitted if, for example, the buyer wishes to use their own electronics. It requires technical knowledge for construction and calibration, but can be less expensive compared to competing pre-built 3D printers. The frame design allows it to be easily built with a closed chamber, allowing it to print temperature-sensitive materials such as ABS.

The V-Core was introduced in 2017, and the V-Core 2 was released around 2018. In 2021, the V-Core 3 was released, gaining some popularity in the maker movement as one of the first commercial high-speed CoreXY printers. The frame is currently made of 30×30 mm aluminum profiles (previously 20×20 mm) with T-slots, and is available with build volumes in the 4 sizes of (200^{3}) mm, (300^{3}) mm, (400^{3}) mm and (500^{3}) mm. It uses extruders and hotends based on the EVA system developed by Pawel Kucmus, which allows for the adaptation of many different extruders and hotends on the market for use on the V-Core. The build plate is not attached directly to the frame, but via ball joints at three independent points to prevent the build plate from twisting when it heats up, and the idea is that the heat will thus affect the flatness minimally. The balls are in turn attached to each their independent leadscrew and motor for adjusting the z-axis, which makes it easy to automatically level the build plate based on the positions of the motors.

In 2024, the V-Core 4 was released, available in the 3 sizes (300^{3}) mm, (400^{3}) mm and (500^{3}) mm. It features an "independent dual extrusion" (IDEX) mode for simultaneous use of two tool heads, allowing for printing with multiple materials at the same time.

== Software ==
Rat Rig offers the software RatOS that runs on Raspberry Pi and is based on Linux. RatOS automatically sets up some configuration files, has some useful macros, and controls the fans, among other things. It is also possible to use Klipper and Mainsail OS without RatOS, for example if you want to use other features than those available in RatOS.

== User communities ==
RatRig has active user communities that share projects, tips, and experiences on various online forums and social media. The community contributes to the development of new ideas and solutions, and provides support for both beginners and experienced builders.

== See also ==
- Voron 2.4, another CoreXY printer delivered as a kit and having an open design
