= Localized pulsed electrodeposition =

Localized pulsed electrodeposition (L-PED) is a technique for direct 3D printing of free-standing and layer-by-layer micro/nano-scale metallic structures at the tip of an electrolyte containing nozzle. The method follows the same principle for metal deposition as the traditional electrodeposition (electroplating), however the area of deposition is limited by the size of a liquid bridge (meniscus) formed between the nozzle tip and the substrate. The unique advantage of the L-PED process is the possibility of the control over the spatial microstructure of the printed metal in 3D geometries by adjusting deposition parameters (peak current density, on time, off time, etc.). This method can be used in various applications in nanotechnology, in particular for 3-dimensional electronics and sensors.

== 3D Printing Process ==
A nozzle with a few microns to sub-micron tip, containing the electrolyte of the metal of interest, works as the printing tool bit. When the nozzle approaches the substrate, the meniscus is formed at the nozzle tip, and functions as a confined electrodeposition bath. A two-electrode configuration was employed for the L-PED process, consists of a working electrode (the substrate) and a counter electrode (a metal wire which is inserted within the micropipette). The metal ions are reduced at the growth front within the meniscus area and deposited at the substrate by application of an appropriate pulsed electric potential between the electrodes. The precise and controlled motion of the relative position of the nozzle and the substrate results in printing of desired 3D pure metallic objects.

== Involved Mechanisms ==
The L-PED involves several ionic transport mechanisms including convection (driven by evaporation), diffusion and migration. These transport mechanisms are affected by short duration ON-pulses, and longer duration OFF-pulses. Subsequently, the ion concentration and the current density constantly change in each pulse cycle. These parameters eventually regulate the printing rate and the microstructure of the printed metal in L-PED.

== Historical background ==
The localized electrodeposition was first reported by a group at University of Illinois at Urbana-Champaign in 2006, and was used to fabricate high-density and high quality interconnects and wire bonds. A research group at University of Texas at Dallas studied the process further and determined that through the application of a pulsed voltage, nanotwinned metals can be 3D-printed. They demonstrated the ambient environment L-PED process for direct printing of 3D free-standing nanotwinned Cu nanostructures for the first time.

== See also ==
- 3D printing speed
