= Home position =

Reference position of a mechanical motion system

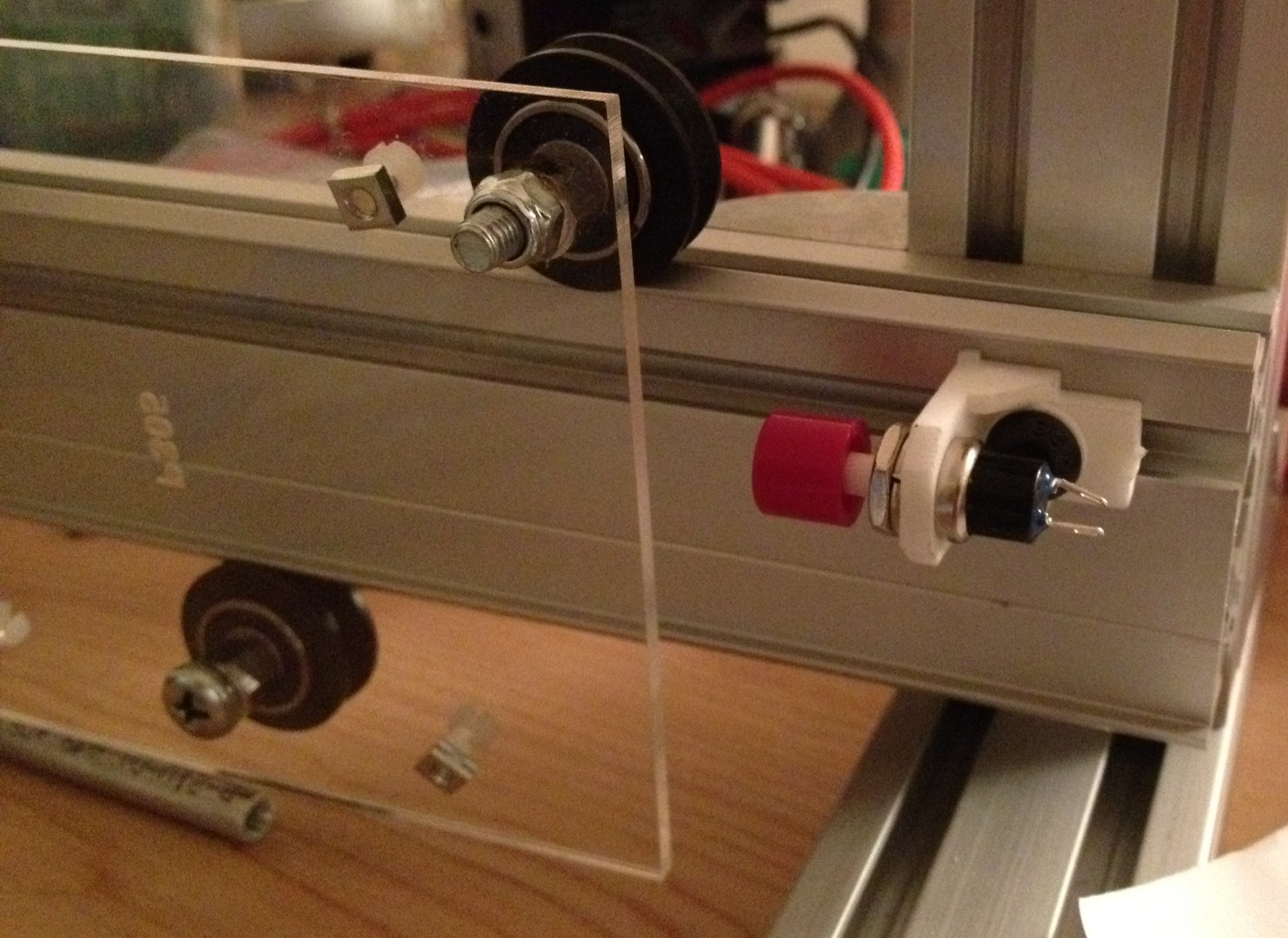
Endstop (with red cap) on a FirePick delta robot pick-and-place machine used to determine home position

A home position is the reference position of a mechanical motion system. It is used to let numerically controlled machines know where the machine's parts (such as the toolhead) are in relation to the motion system's coordinate system.

On machines using incremental encoders, a start-up procedure (so-called homing) is required to find the machine's home position at start-up (the mechanical system's reference position, or origin) or alternatively the machine's limitations in the x, y or z directions. A common method is to use some form of limit switch as a sensor. Examples of the use of limit switches are during start-up and operation of milling machines, routers, robotics, pick-and-place machines and 3D printers. Such a start-up procedure is not required with an absolute encoder. Regardless of whether an incremental encoder with a start-up procedure or an absolute encoder is used, knowledge of the absolute position is useful for maintaining consistent and accurate position, which provides repeatability.

Limit switches can also be used as endstops for crash detection by triggering an automatic stop when the machine has reached a physical limit. This can happen if something goes wrong with the machine that causes it to lose control of where the toolhead is and move outside of its normal working range. A limit switch then acts as a safeguard against the machine traveling too far and causing a catastrophic failure.

== Motivation ==
Absolute encoders provide an absolute position, but most encoders are incremental and therefore report motion rather than position. An encoder being incremental means that it can report how many rotations or linear movements it has had since it was powered on, but cannot itself know where it started.

For an incremental encoder to track and report absolute position, the encoder counts must be correlated with a reference position (datum) in the mechanical system to which the encoder is connected. This is usually done by driving the system to a home position, which consists of moving the mechanical system (and encoder) until it is aligned with a reference position. Then, the subsequent absolute position can be calculated from the known home position and all subsequent movements.

== Methods for determining home position ==
A limit switch is a simple form of endstop that uses an electrical switch (typically a mechanical microswitch) that can be touched by, for example, a toolhead or other part of the machine. Instead of conventional mechanical microswitches, it is also possible to use, for example, optical endstop switches or magnetic endstop (Hall-effect) switches.

A "sensorless" endstop is another variant that instead detects that a motor suddenly experiences increased resistance as it approaches the stall torque, which may be a sign that the machine has reached the end of its motion system. Such functionality is found, for example, in drivers for some stepper motors.

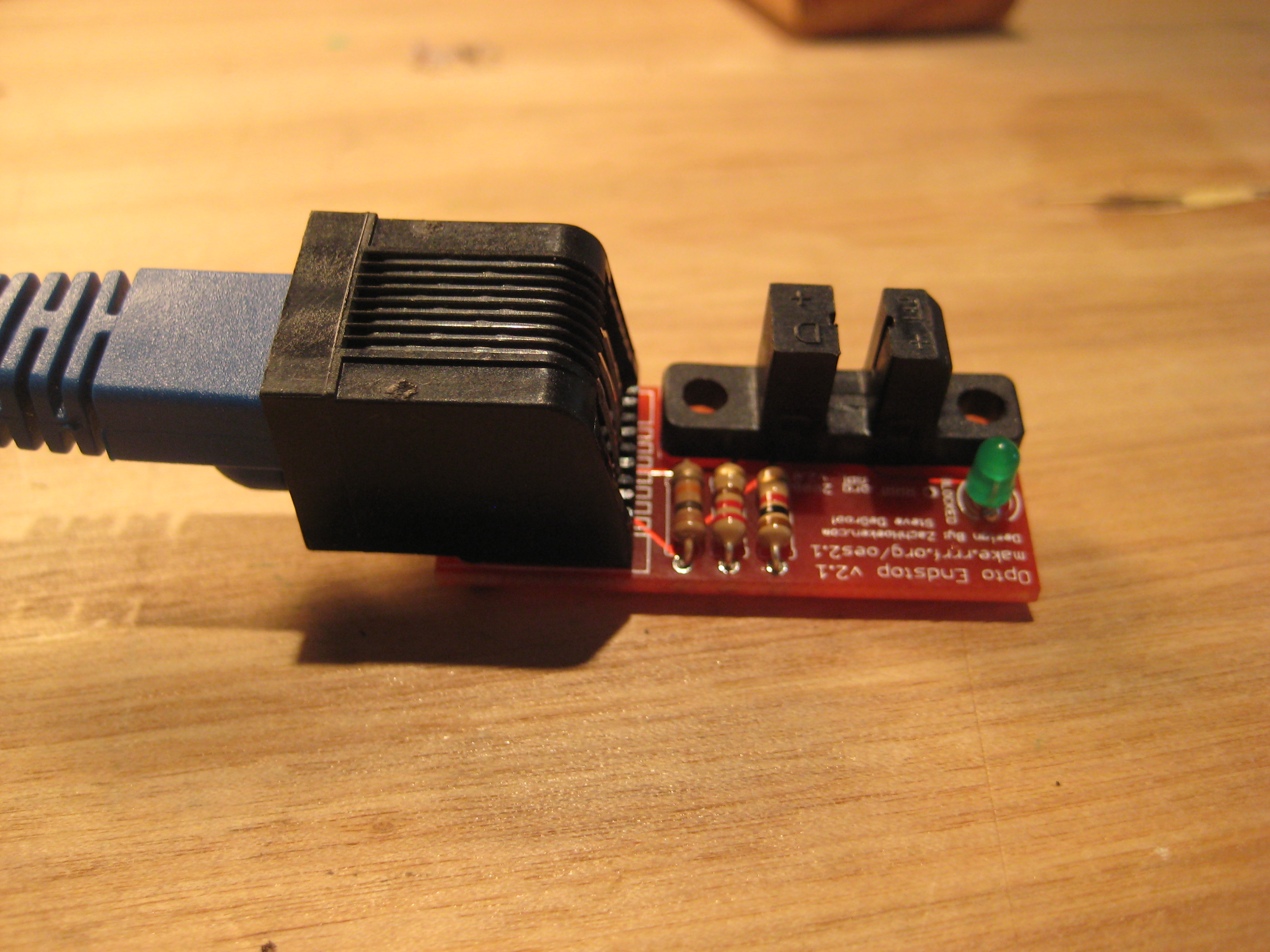
RepRap Opto Endstop v2.1

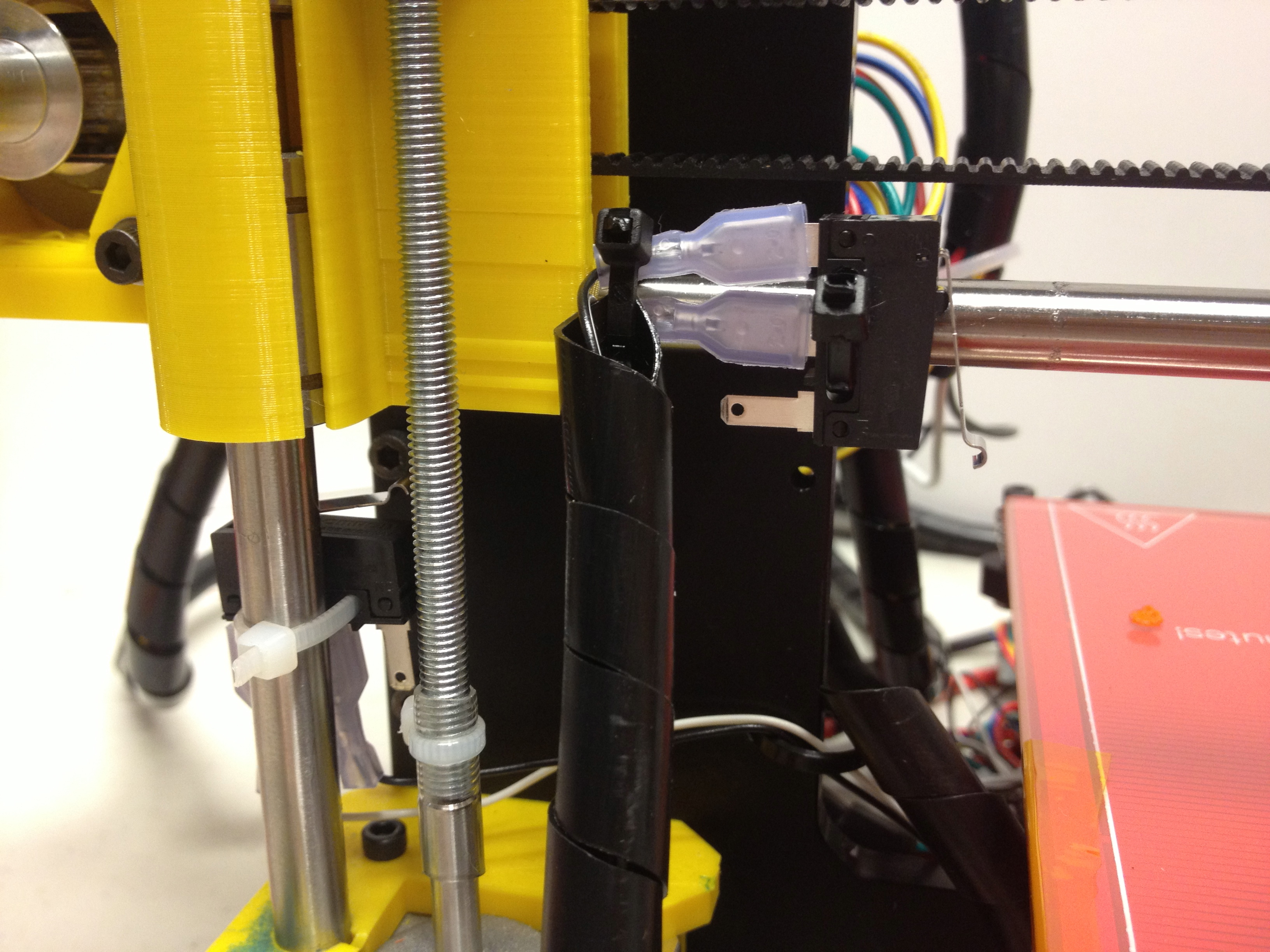
Mechanical X and Z endstops on a Prusa i3

== See also ==
- Digital readout, numeric display for keeping track of the position of a workpiece relative to the tool
- Metrology, the science of measurement and its application
- Origin, a similar concept in mathematics
