= Voron (surname) =

Voron is a Russian language surname from the Russian word for raven. Notable people with the name include:

- Maurice Voron (1928–2004), French rugby league footballer
- Viacheslav Voron (1967), Russian songwriter
