= Voron, Crimea =

Vorun Vörün
- Village
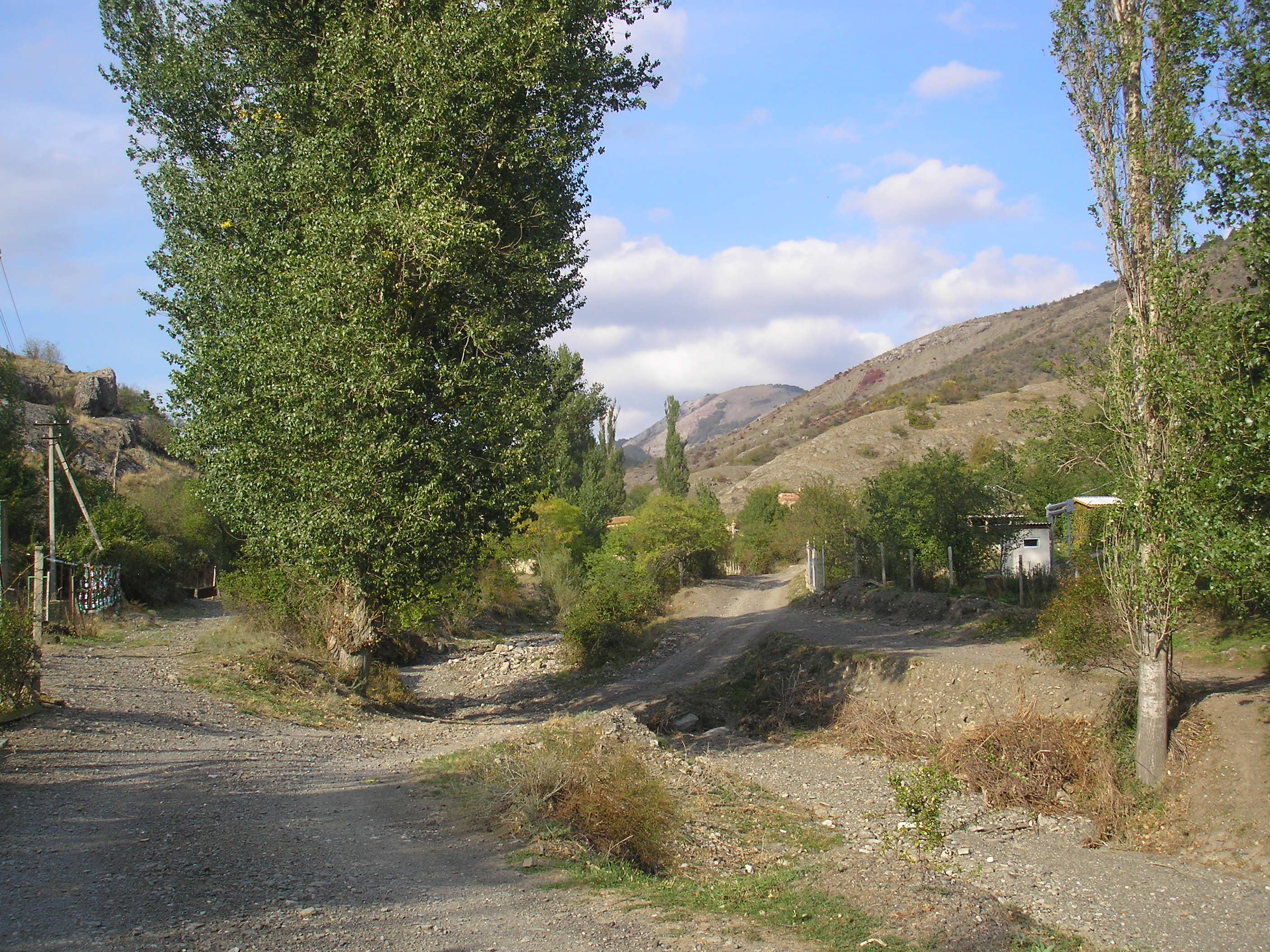
- View of Vorun, with the Crimean Mountains in the background.

- Location of Vorun in Crimea
- Coordinates: 44°53′30″N 34°49′05″E
- Republic: Crimea
- Municipality: Sudak Municipality
- First mentioned: 1381

Area
  - Total: 0.25 km^{2} (0.097 sq mi)
- Elevation: 223 m (732 ft)

Population (2014)
  - Total: 178
  - Density: 710/km^{2} (1,800/sq mi)
- Time zone: UTC+4 (MSK)
- Postal code: 98030
- Area code: +380 6566
- Website: http://rada.gov.ua/

Vorun (Ukrainian: Ворун; Russian: Ворон; Crimean Tatar: Vörün) is a village in the Sudak Municipality of the Crimea, a territory recognized by a majority of countries as part of Ukraine and annexed by Russia as the Republic of Crimea.

Vorun is located on Crimea's southern shore on the Black Sea at an elevation of 223 m (732 ft). Its population was 202 in the 2001 Ukrainian census. Current population: 178 (2014 Census).
