= Voron, Vologda Oblast =

Voron Ворон
- Village
- Location within Vologda Oblast Location within Russia
- Coordinates: 59°11′N 36°47′E
- Country: Russia
- Region: Vologda Oblast
- District: Kaduysky District
- Time zone: UTC+3:00

Voron (Russian: Ворон) is a rural locality (a village) in Semizerye Rural Settlement, Kaduysky District, Vologda Oblast, Russia. The population was 4 as of 2002.

== Geography ==
Voron is located 25 km west of Kaduy (the district's administrative centre) by road. Grigorovo is the nearest rural locality.
