= Viacheslav Voron =

Russian-Ukrainian singer (born 1967)

- Born: Viacheslav Borisovich Cherny; October 21, 1967 (age 58)
- Origin: Ukraine, Mariupol
- Genres: Chanson
- Occupations: Singer, composer, writer, producer, poet
- Labels: Master sound, Mega records, Mistery Sound, CiDiCom.
- Website: http://www.voronsong.narod.ru

Viacheslav Voron (Russian: Вячеслав Ворон; real name: Viacheslav Borisovich Cherny (Russian: Вячеслав Бopисович Чёpный); born October 21, 1967, in Mariupol, Ukraine) is a singer-songwriter of the Russian and Ukrainian chanson, music producer. The author of over 60 songs in styles chanson and romance of the street.

== Biography ==
Born on October 21, 1967, in the city of Mariupol, Ukraine. He studied at secondary school No. 4 Mariupol. In 9 years, began to study in accordion music Studio. A year later he enrolled in music school. Independently mastered the technique of playing the guitar. After graduating the eighth grade school, he entered the Industrial College, where he was immediately enrolled in guitar ensemble. Around this time, Vyacheslav invite in vocals and instrumentals bands in DK Koksohimzavoda. In 1987, in the army he creates a band "Action" and within two years band playing on garrisons. In 1989, Vyacheslav was studies the Moscow Institute of Steel and Alloys. But creativity is not throwing. Wrote songs, poems, and participated in amateur performances of the Institute. In 1996, recorded the first album "Забери меня мать ..." and from that moment begins a creative way to chanson.

== Discography ==
- 1996 Zaberi menya mati...
- 1997 Krasnie tramvaichiki
- 1998 Dusha zhiganska
- 1999 Ne davi na gaz
- 2000 Eshelon

== Video ==
- 1997 Zhizn blatnaya moya
- 1999 Na volu
- 2008 Uezjaut na grajdanku dembelya
- 2009 Mariupol

== Books ==
- (in Russian) Легенды русского шансона (Р. Никитин, 2002, ISBN 978-5-85929-074-1)
- (in Russian) Легенды и звёзды шансона. От Вертинского до Шуфутинского (М. Кравчинский, Н. Насонова, 2008, ISBN 978-5-367-00758-9)
- (in Russian) Пепел и золото Акелы, или Ответ знает только Пепел. (Игорь Чубаха, Александр Логачев, 2003, ISBN 978-5-94371-419-1)
- (in Russian) Петлюра. Юрий Барабаш. Тексты песен, ноты, аккорды.(Нота-Р, 2003, ISBN 978-5-94037-028-4)
