= Klipper (firmware) =

Open source software for 3D printers

- Developer: Kevin O'Connor
- Written in: C
- Type: 3D printer firmware
- License: GPL-3.0
- Website: www.klipper3d.org
- Repository: github.com/Klipper3d/klipper

Klipper is an open source firmware for 3D printers that distributes the workload between a general-purpose computer (such as a Raspberry Pi) and one or more underlying microcontrollers on the 3D printer. The separation claims to allow for more advanced control compared to traditional firmware that runs solely on the printer's microcontroller. Klipper supports multiple types of kinematics, including Cartesian, CoreXY and delta robot.

== History ==
Klipper was developed by Kevin O'Connor in 2014. One of the early adopters was the Voron project which built CoreXY printers with open-source software and open-source hardware. Klipper's popularity has gradually increased over time, and in 2024 it came pre-installed on 3D printers from several manufacturers.

In 2022, Klipper entered into a strategic partnership with BigTreeTech, a manufacturer of motherboards for 3D printers.

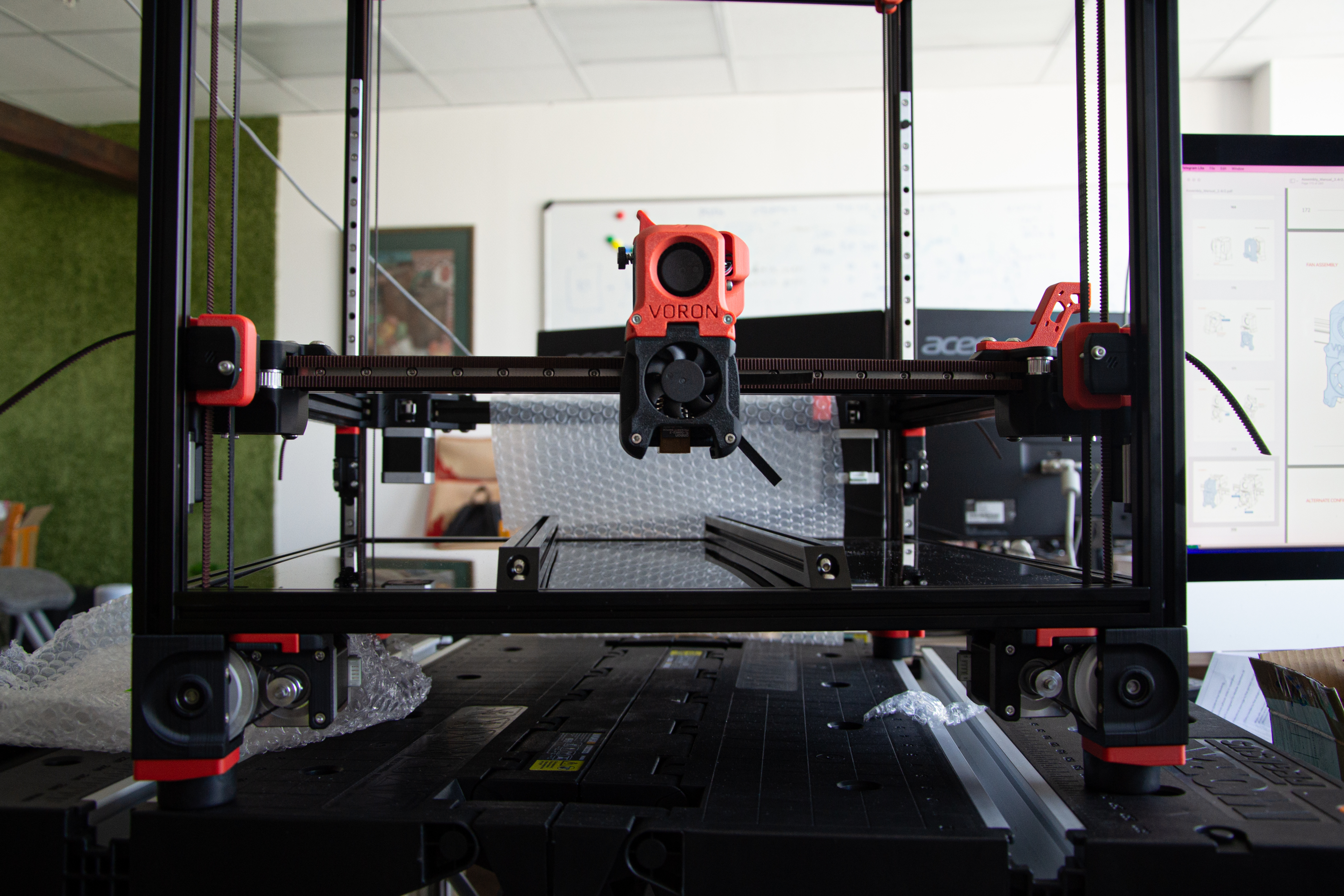
Input shaping was introduced in 3D printers (such as the pictured Voron 2.4) by Klipper in 2020

In late 2020, Klipper introduced input shaping into the world of open-source 3D printing firmware.

== Features ==
As the host computer has more processing power and is capable of doing more intensive calculations, only the results of these calculations need to be sent to the microcontroller. This enables more precise control of stepper motors, advanced kinematics, input shaping for vibration reduction, detailed logging, use of macros, and changing configurations in real-time without the need to restart the firmware.

The printer also has pressure advance, which is a parameter that compensates for the pressure build-up in the nozzle during acceleration for smoother and more precise printing. It works by making the extrusion advance faster during strong accelerations, and advance slower during strong decelerations. This way, smoother lines can be achieved at high 3D printing speeds. The compensation is usually calibrated per material type (PLA, ABS, PETG, and so on), but can even be calibrated for each specific spool. The model takes into account the elasticity, viscosity, pressure and flow of the filament.

== Supported hardware ==
Klipper supports several types of 3D printers and microcontrollers, including boards from Arduino and STM32. It is compatible with many existing printers, and can be adapted to custom-built machines.

== Installation, configuration and interaction ==
Klipper is set up on a computer running Linux (such as Raspberry Pi). Configuration is done through a text-based configuration file, which allows for customization and control of the printer's behavior.

== See also ==
- Marlin (firmware), another open source firmware for 3D printers
