= Input shaping =

Technique for reducing machine vibrations

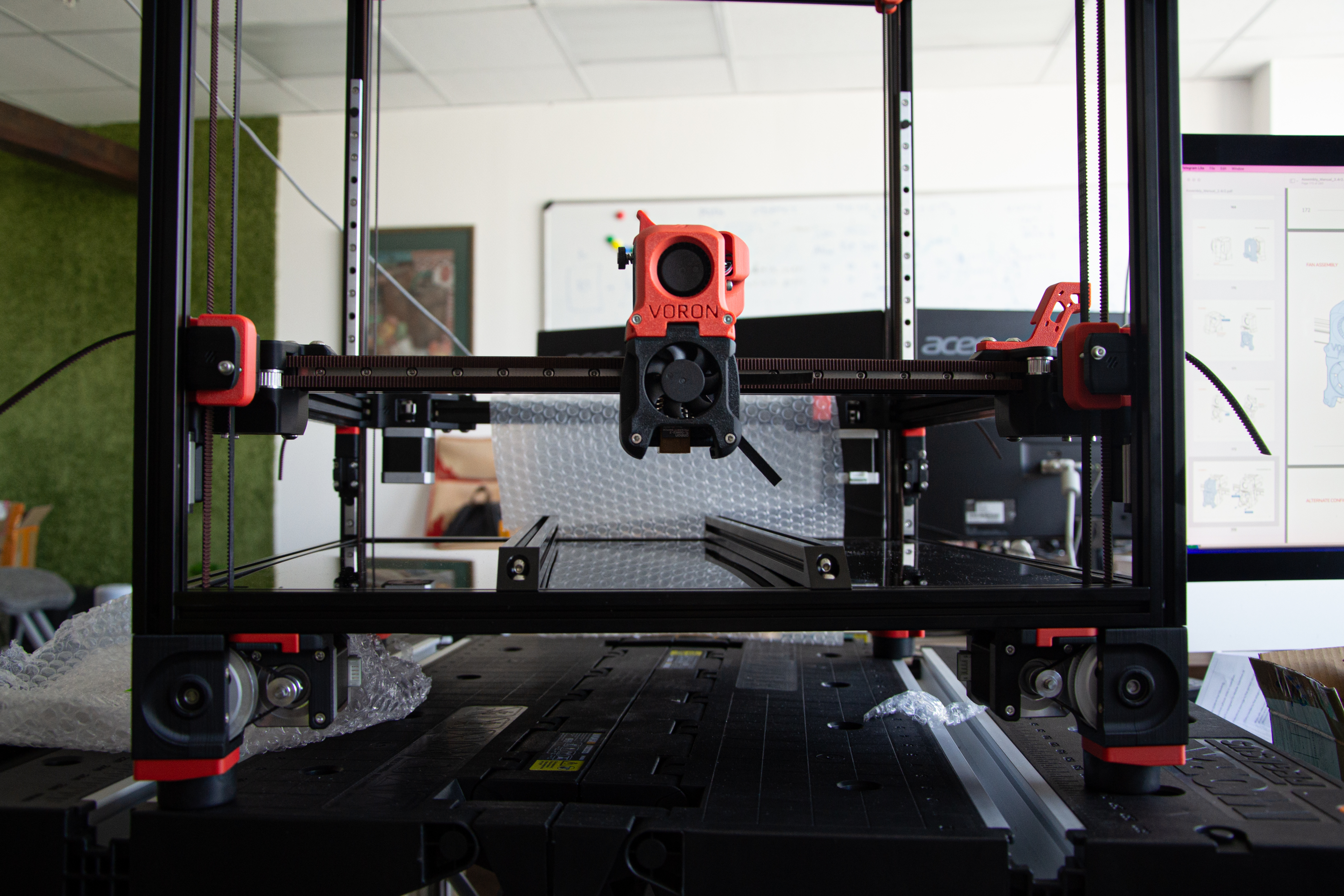
Input shaping is used in modern 3D printers with stepper motors configured in open loop, such as this Voron 2.4 where the shaping is done in Klipper

In control theory, input shaping is an open-loop control technique for reducing vibrations in computer-controlled machines. The method works by creating a command signal that cancels its own vibration. That is, a vibration excited by previous parts of the command signal is cancelled by vibration excited by latter parts of the command.

Input shaping is implemented by convolving a sequence of impulses, known as an input shaper, with any arbitrary command. The shaped command that results from the convolution is then used to drive the system.

If the impulses in the shaper are chosen correctly, then the shaped command will excite less residual vibration than the unshaped command. The amplitudes and time locations of the impulses are obtained from the system's natural frequencies and damping ratios. Shaping can be made very robust to errors in the system parameters.

== Example ==
As an example, consider a linear system with a resonant frequency of 1Hz. If a step input is applied, the system will oscillate at 1 hertz for a length of time determined by the damping associated with the resonant mode. For some systems, such as cranes, the oscillation can last for minutes, while a comparable rigid system could be maneuvered in seconds.

However, if the original step input is applied at half magnitude, and again at half magnitude 0.5 seconds later (which for 1 Hz is half the period of the resonant frequency), the resulting oscillations in the system are out of phase and cancel entirely. This applies to both acceleration and deceleration of the system.
