= CoreXY =

2-dimensional kinematic system

CoreXY is a kinematic motion system, popularized by its use to move the printhead of a 3D printer, or the toolhead in CNC machines, in the horizontal plane. The advantage of this technique is that the two motors used to perform the movement in the horizontal plane are stationary and do not have to move themselves, which can result in less moving mass. Instead, drive belts are used which are connected in an intricate way to provide movement in a Cartesian coordinate system. Compared to conventional Cartesian coordinate 3D printers for fused filament, it can provide increased printing speed due to less moving mass.

== Movement ==
For movement along the x-axis, both motors must rotate in the same direction. For movement along the y-axis, the motors must rotate in opposite directions. If only one motor rotates, the movement will be diagonal.

The movement can be mathematically described as follows. If A is the movement of the first motor and B the movement of the second motor, the movement in the x and y directions is given by:

$$\begin{align}
\Delta x &= \tfrac{1}{2}(\Delta A + \Delta B) \\[2px]
\Delta y &= \tfrac{1}{2}(\Delta A - \Delta B)
\end{align}$$

== Compared to conventional printers ==
Other Cartesian 3D printers which do not use the CoreXY technique most commonly also use two motors for the xy-plane, but where one motor is independently responsible for movement along the x-axis, and the other independently responsible for movement along the y-axis. This is sometimes called a Cartesian technique. "Bed slinger" is a Cartesian variant where the build surface moves along the y-axis, and the print head moves along the x-axis, and this technique is used on amongst others the Prusa i3 and clones.

== Variations ==
CoreXZ is a variant that resembles CoreXY rotated 90 degrees so that the A/B motors control the xz axes instead of the xy axes. It can be used, for example, to replace conventional vertical lead screws with belt drives. One advantage is faster movement in the z direction, while a disadvantage is less accuracy in the z direction.

== See also ==
- Delta robot, a parallel robot mechanism used in delta 3D printers
- SCARA, a robot arm-like mechanism used in 3D printers
- Voron 2.4, a CoreXY printer with open source hardware and software
- Rat Rig V-Core, a CoreXY printer with open source hardware and software
