= 3D printing speed =

Amount of material printed per unit of time

In 3D printing, the printing speed is a measure for how much material is printed per unit of time ($\text{amount} / \text{time}$). It's an important parameter for the time it takes to print, and can affect the quality of the print.

Units used varies depends on the type of additive manufacturing technique. The unit of manufactured material is typically measured in units of either mass (kg), length (mm) or volume (cm^{3}), and the unit of time is usually measured in seconds (or sometimes hours). For example, fused filament fabrication typically uses mm/s or mm^{3}/s, while stereolithography typically uses mm/h or layers per hour.

== Examples ==
The following table compares typical speeds of some commercially relevant 3D printing technologies (updated 2020):

Technology	Normal speed	Max speed	Normal acceleration	Max acceleration	Normal volumetric flow	Max volumetric flow
Fused filament fabrication (FFF/FDM)	50–150 mm/s	500 mm/s	0.5–1 k mm/s^{2}	20 k mm/s^{2}		
Multi jet fusion (MJF)			(Not critical)		2800–4000 cm^{3}/h	4500 cm^{3}/h
Selective laser sintering (SLS)	48 mm/s	60 mm/s	(Not critical)			
Stereolithography (SLA) / Digital light processing (DLP)	20–36 mm/h	720 mm/h	(Not critical)			

== Importance of speed for time usage ==
3D printing speed refers to only the build stage, a subcomponent of the entire 3D printing process. However, the entire process spans from pre-processing to post-processing stages. The time required for printing a completed part from a data file (.stl or .obj) is calculated as the sum of the time for the following stages:

1. Pre-processing stage, which spans the preparation process of both part and printer. This is required before the actual printing starts. It is calculated as the sum of the time required for the following processes:
  - Positioning and orienting of the part to be printed
  - Entering the parameters (e.g. layer thickness, material type) within the printer's software
  - Generation of the support structure
  - Generation of slices (slicing)
  - Generation of the tool path plan by the software (including infill and infill pattern)
  - Warming up and loading of support and build materials
  - The setting of the x-y and z axes
  - Diagnostics, cleaning or additional testing
2. Build stage, which is the actual print time after the prepared data are transferred to the printer for manufacturing. It can be considered as the sum of the following periods:
  - Manufacturing time, when the part and support materials are being manufactured
  - Idle time, non-productive time such as z-axis movement, cooling time, leveling, non-manufacturing movement of printhead
3. Post-processing stage, which is the final stage, taking place post part manufacturing. It includes the following processes:
  - Removing the supports
  - Refining the surface for obtaining the desired surface quality

== Speed up ==
Additive manufacturing technologies usually imply a trade off between the printing speed and quality. Improvements in speed of the entire 3D printing process can be grouped into improvements to software and hardware:

=== Software improvements ===
Since the actual printing process is directly influenced by how the model is sliced, oriented, and filled, optimizing them results in shorter print times.

Optimal orientation. Changing the orientation of a part can be done through either the STL file or on the CAD model, or in the slicer before generating the gcode. Determining the optimal part orientation is a common software solution for all additive manufacturing processes. This can lead to a significant improvement in many key factors that affect the total print time. The following factors heavily depend on part orientation:

- Height of the part in the build direction: Build speed is slower for z-direction than x-y directions. By minimizing height, the number of layers will be decreased. Hence, both manufacturing and idle time decrease.
- Volume of support material and contact area on the part: The less support material used, the faster the build time and finishing time for removing supports. By minimizing the support volume, less material is deposited so, in general, manufacturing time decreases. This factor influences processes that use external support structures, such as SLA, FDM.
- Quality of the total surface area: The orientation of a part determines which faces are subjected to the staircase effect -- an artifact of layering. By maximizing the surface quality, the required time to finish the surface to the desired tolerance decreases.

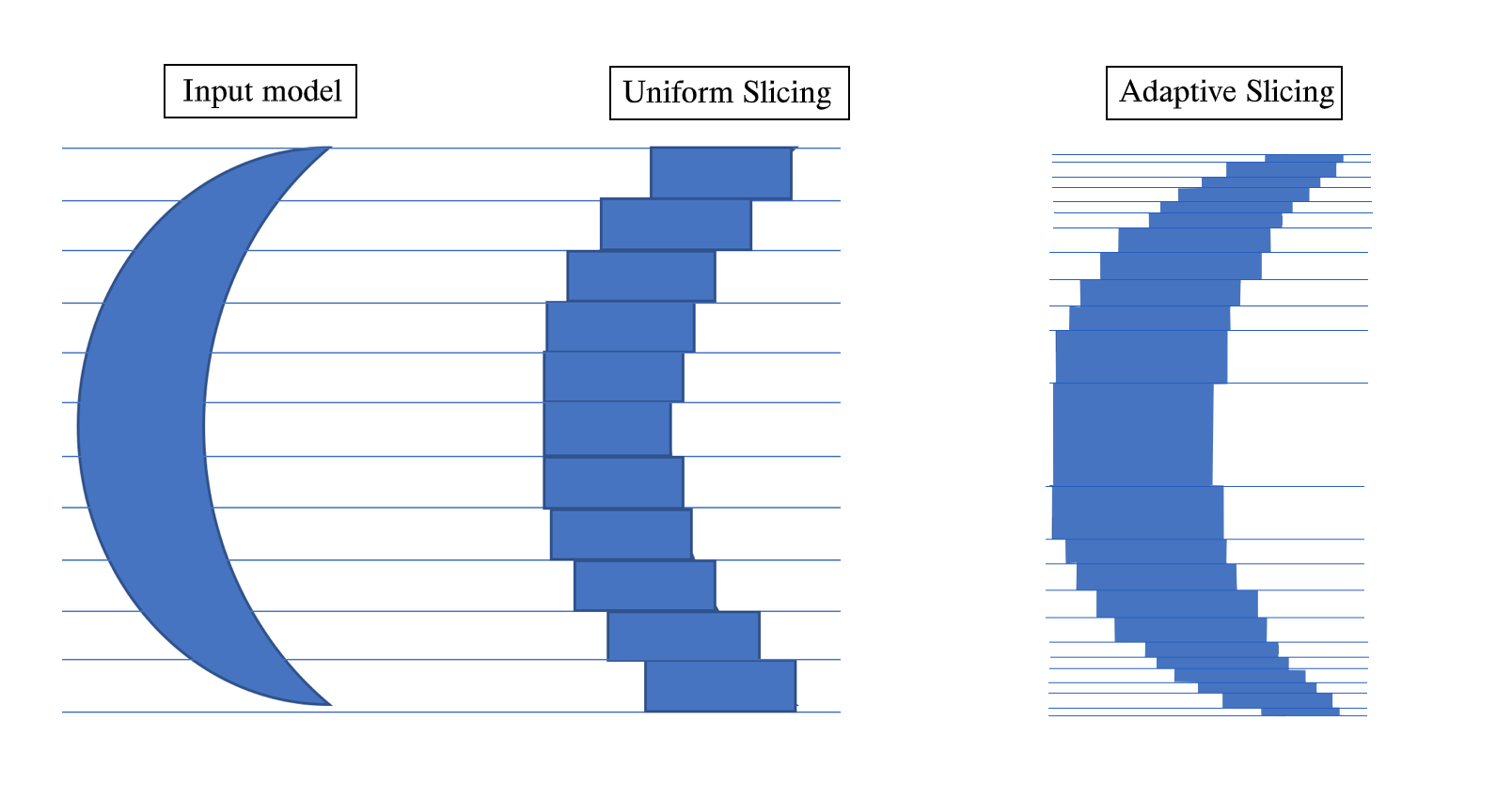
Uniform and adaptive slicing

Adaptive slicing. Error caused by the staircase effect can be measured using several metrics, all of which refer to the difference between model surface and actual printed surface. By adaptively computing the height distribution of layers, this error can be minimized: The quality of surface increases while post-processing time decreases. The benefits of adaptive slicing depend on the proportion of the surface-to-volume ratio of the part. Efficient computation of adaptive layers is possible by analyzing the model surface over the full layer height. Several implementations are available as an open source software.

=== Hardware improvements ===
Increasing the speed of printing through hardware can take the following forms, many of which are used by leading 3D printing companies.

- Modified printheads: using different types of printheads for different printing processes. For instance, having an additional knifed feeder to prevent filament slipping.
- Temperature: including an additional laser to melt the filament before going to the extruder. This prevents unnecessary printhead heating, thereby lowering printhead cooling time.
- Minimizing adhesion force within the dead layer of Digital Light Projector based technologies.
- Gel Dispensing Printing technology, which extrudes a gel material immediately hardened by UV-LED curing
- Adding more printheads which collaborative using path planning to increase the printing speed.
- Using special types of materials for specific manufacturing technologies.

== Challenges ==
Depending on the technology used, there are some challenges that could limit the speed of the 3D printing:

- Shape optimization. Since a product's interior can be filled using many different structures, design optimization through additive manufacturing is necessary. Finding the best way to fill in a product interior given certain constraints is a challenging problem.
- Part orientation. Theoretically, there are infinitely many orientations. Depending on the purpose of the part, there may not be an optimal orientation when trying to optimize multiple criteria at once.
- Slicing. Two main challenges with the slicing are the staircase effect and the containment problem.
- Tool path planning. Since the speed of the printing tool can change the size of the layer, the physical and mechanical properties of the process need to be taken into account during the tool path planning.
- Post-processing. The removed support material can still leave burrs or residue that can be polished by using other methods like sanding the part by hand, bead blasting, traditional machining, or acetone finishing.
- Hardware and maintenance issues. After a part is printed, typical cleanup procedures required to ensure that operations continue with the same quality. Depending on the used material's type, parameters of lasers need to be tuned for avoiding the unnecessary over-curing or sintering.
- Printing methodologies. Each printing methods has its own pros and cons. For example, DLP-based methods have an advantage of manufacturing the entire layer at once. However, DLP idle time is longer due to the adhesion force. SLA based method uses two or more lasers that intersect at specific points to cure the material -- point by point curing -- however, it presents challenges in both planning and implementation. Layer-less methods have more complicated path planning.

== Research ==
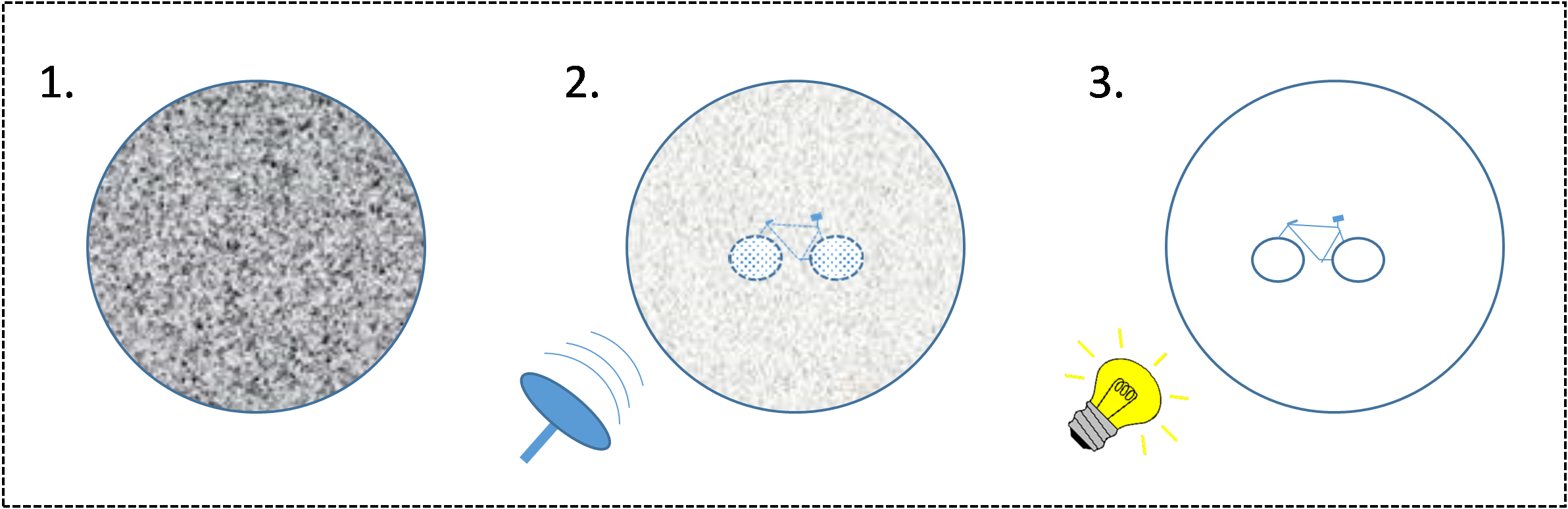
1. Homogeneous material 2. The structured ultrasound field is applied 3. UV light is applied to cure the resulting shape of the previous step

=== Acoustic fabrication ===
Interesting features of sound waves have encouraged scientists to use it in additive manufacturing. Sound waves can form pressure fields that shape the material in the desired form in a contact-free setup. The fact that it can be applied over a large area at the same time makes it a good candidate for rapid fabrication.

The process starts by designing an acoustic hologram. An acoustic hologram is a mask that will direct the sound field to form the desired pattern. It can be fabricated in an additive fabrication combined with etching and nanoimprint methods. The process follows by placing silicone rubber particles in a liquid medium with photo-initiator agents. Then the acoustic mask is used to generate the desired pressure sound field to put the particle in the correct order. The next step is applying the UV light to solidify the final product.

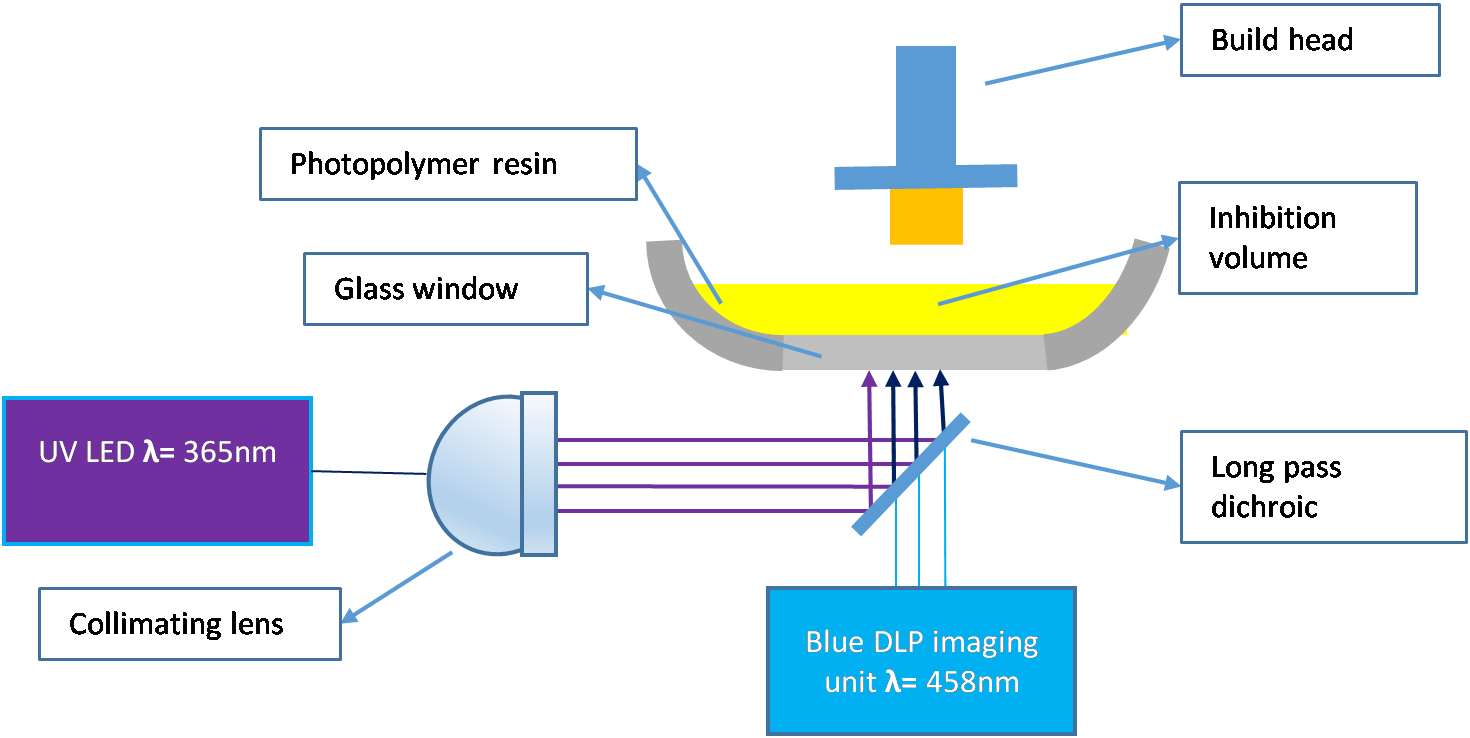
Rapid Continuous additive manufacturing by inhibition patterning

=== Improved SLA processes ===
The speed of SLA processes is limited by:

- Adhesion of cured material to the projection window
- Disturbance of the resin surface

Rapid continuous additive manufacturing by inhibition patterning

Due to the mentioned effects, the printing speed with SLA methods is limited to a few millimeters to several centimeters per hour. To address this problem a system of two light sources is used, one for polymerization and one for inhibiting the polymerization to avoid adhesion and as a result print faster. This method allows us to speed up the process up to 200 cm/hr. Moreover, by controlling the intensity of each pixel in the setup topographical patterning can be created in a single exposure with no stage translation. A mixture of photo initiators and photo inhibitors is used in the setup. The absorbance spectra of two material is orthogonal this allows to control the process with the two orthogonal light sources. As the material is generated layer by layer the tray is gradually lifted and the photo inhibitors will not allow adhesion near the window.

Rapid, large-volume, thermally controlled 3D printing, using a mobile liquid interface

Another way to address the adhesion problem is to create a dead layer which prohibits the curing process. One method to create this dead layer is to use fluorinated oil flow. This liquid is omniphobic which means that it repels all the materials and will not stick to anything. The reason to use a flow instead of a static layer is to create a larger force against the adhesion force and also help with the cooling of the cured layer (curing generates heat).

=== Fast 3D printing by integrating construction kit building blocks ===
Dividing an Object into smaller blocks (e.g. Lego parts) before print, can lead to 2.44x increase in speed over conventional printing method. Moreover, when the object needs to be iterated to find the optimal design it is not efficient to reprint the whole object over and over again: One solution is to print the main constant structure only once and reprint only the small changing parts with high resolution. These smaller parts are mounted onto the main structure.

== See also ==
- Rapid prototyping
- CoreXY, a printer type that offers increased print speed compared to conventional Cartesian 3D printers
