= Toolhead =

Modular part of a tool that is held and acts directly on the workpiece

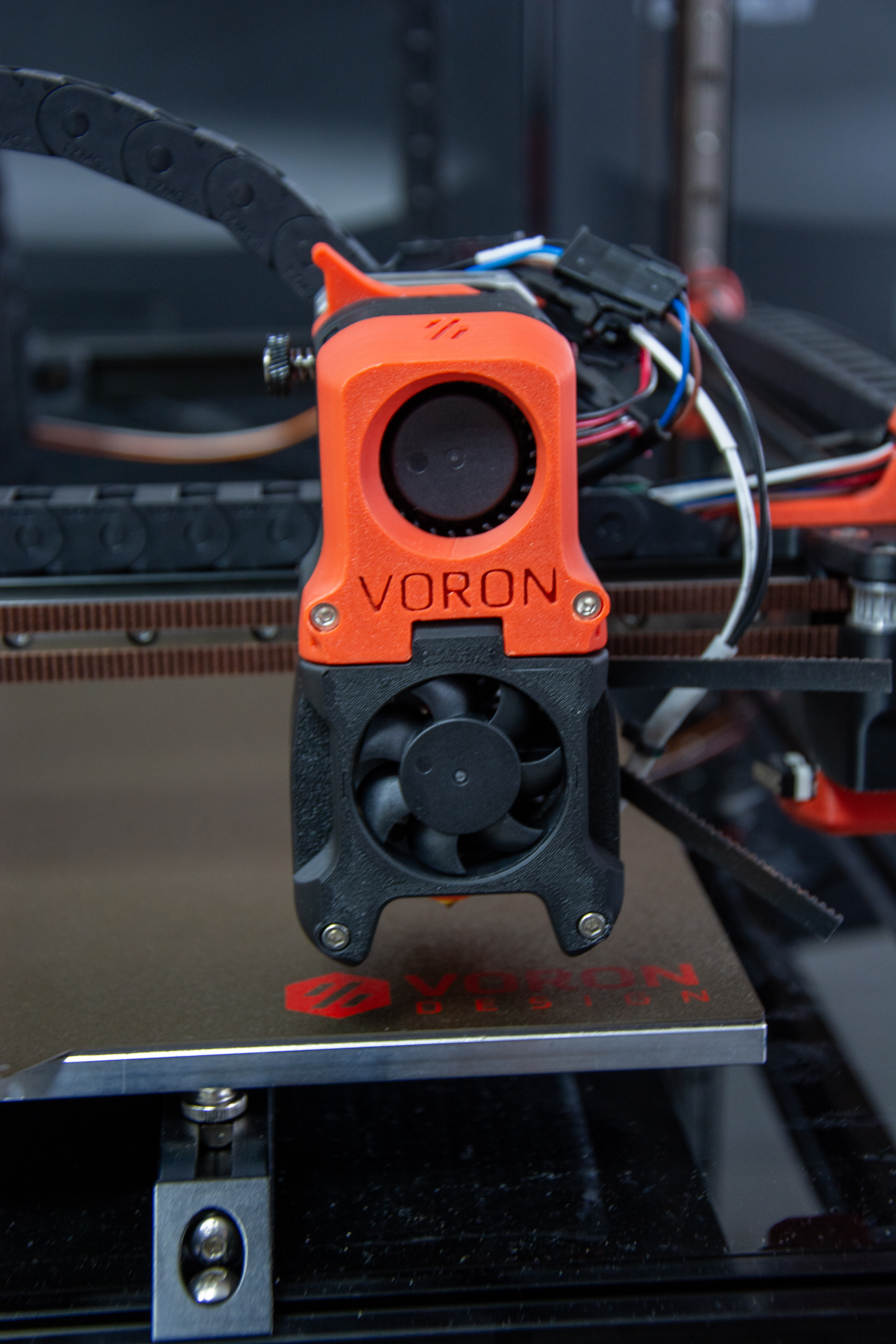
Printhead on a Voron 2.4 3D printer, containing the hotend and direct-drive extruder

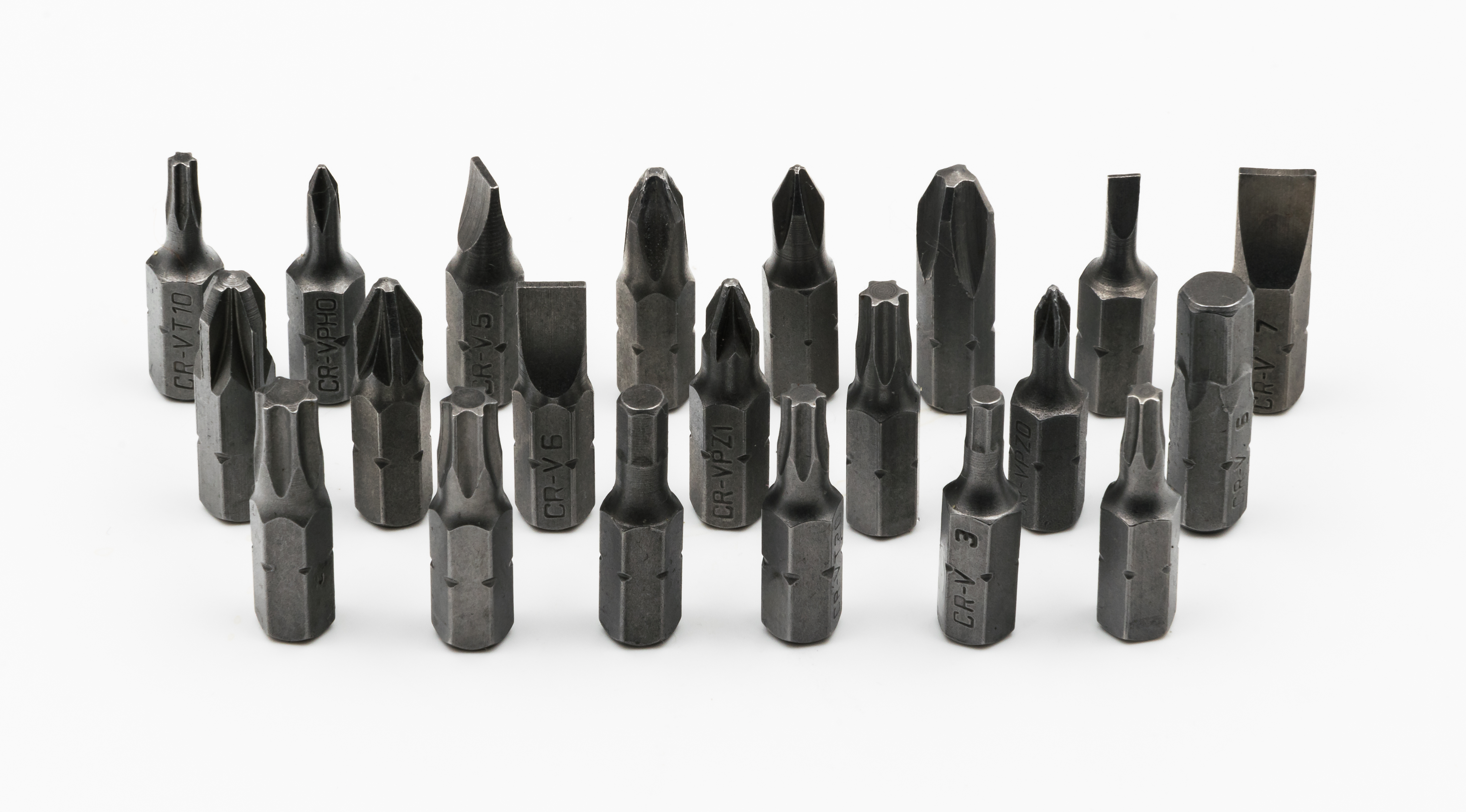
A selection of common screwdriver bits ("toolheads"), including Phillips, Torx, slotted, and hex drive types

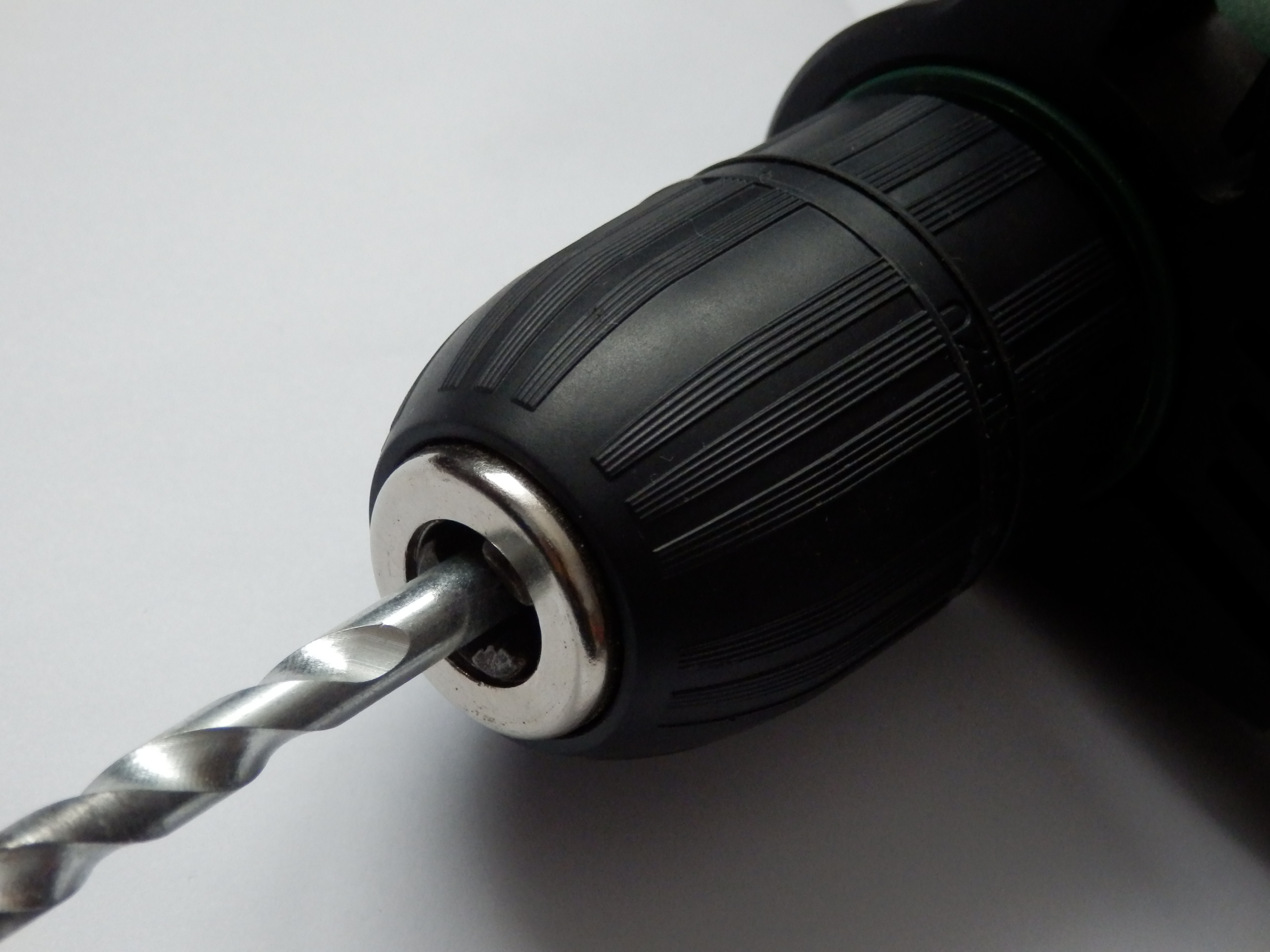
Drill bit ("toolhead") in a chuck

A toolhead is a component of a machine or tool that is held and acts directly on the workpiece. Toolheads can allow for a modular assembly or easier change of tools for different tasks or maintenance. Toolheads can be subtractive and/or additive, that is add or remove material during operation. The position of a toolhead in a machine is important for repeatability, and in numerically controlled machines its position is often calibrated in a process called homing during a machine's startup procedure.

Some examples of toolheads are:

- Printhead (printing), component of a printer responsible for transferring ink (inkjet printhead), toner (laser printhead) or heat (thermal printhead) onto the print medium, such as paper, fabric, or plastic
- Robot end effector, also called toolhead, the device at the end of a robotic arm that interacts with the environment
- Screwdriver bits, sockets and drill bits, interchangeable toolheads enabling use of screwdrivers, socket wrenches and other tools with "bit-drivers" on fasteners with different screw heads by using the corresponding bit
- Toolhead (3D printing) or printhead, component of a 3D printer responsible for transferring material onto the workpiece, for example via filament, powder or resin. One of the main movable parts of a 3D printer which contains the hotend (heating the filament) and, if applicable, also a direct-drive extruder (which performs feeding of the filament).
- Toolhead (handloading), assembly sometimes used on handloading that holds a die, enabling change between different dies without losing their adjustment, thereby increasing output
- Toolhead (machining), part of a milling machine, lathe or other machine tool that holds the cutting tool itself, such as a drill bit or other tools for shaping materials (via a chuck, collet or faceplate)
