= Voron 2.4 =

CoreXY 3D printer released in May 2020

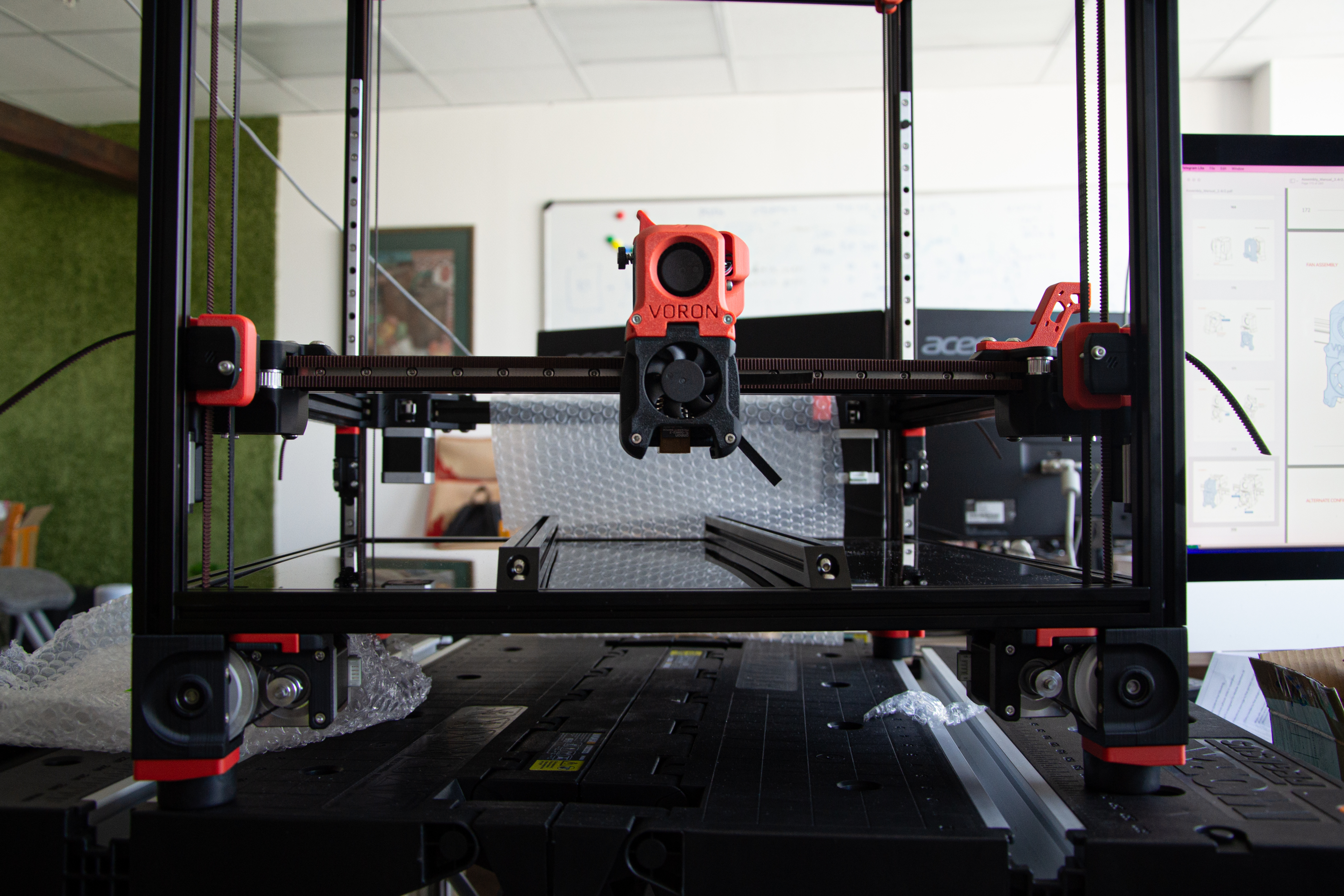
Voron 2.4 3D printer with a flying gantry

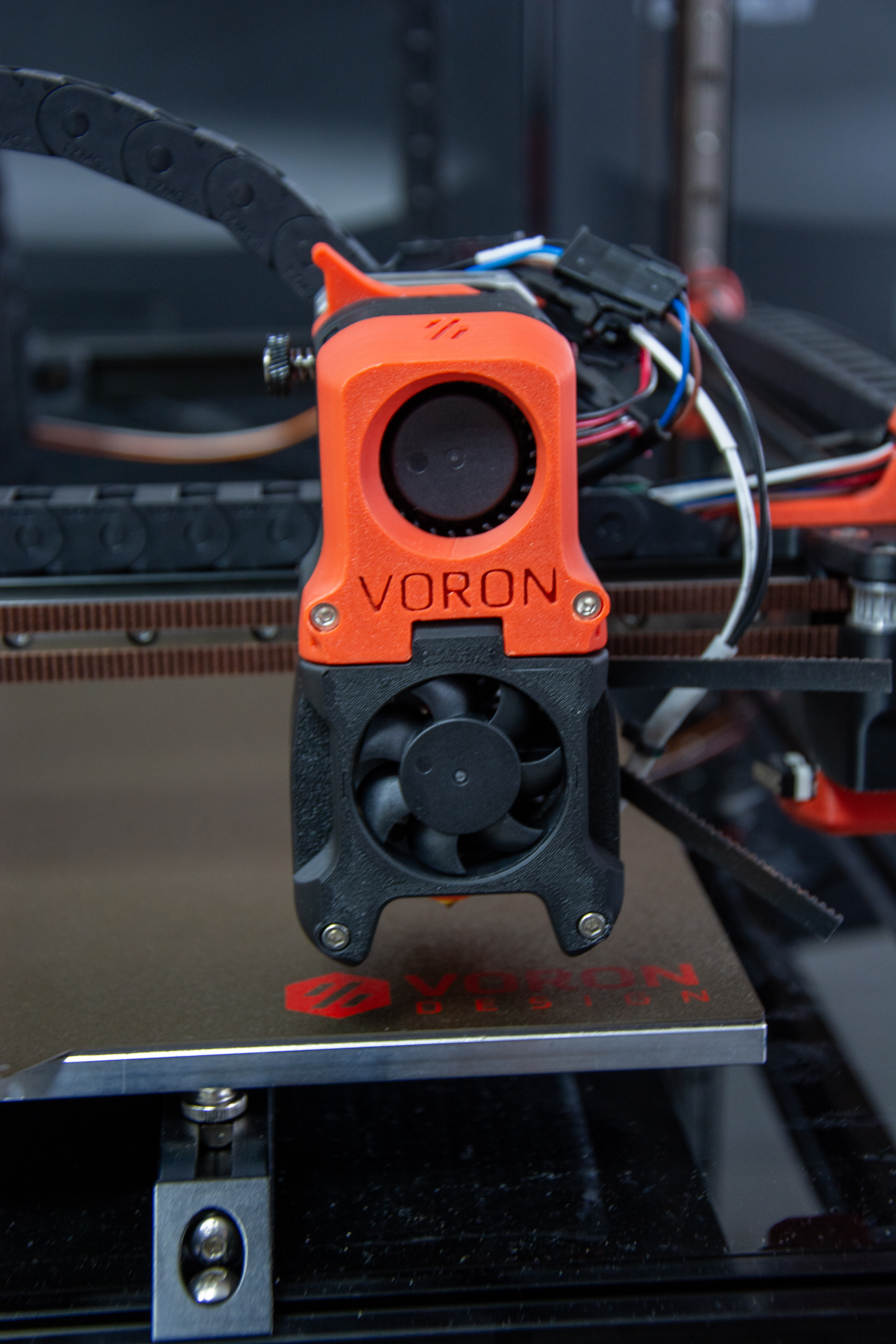
Printhead on a Voron, containing the hotend and direct-drive extruder

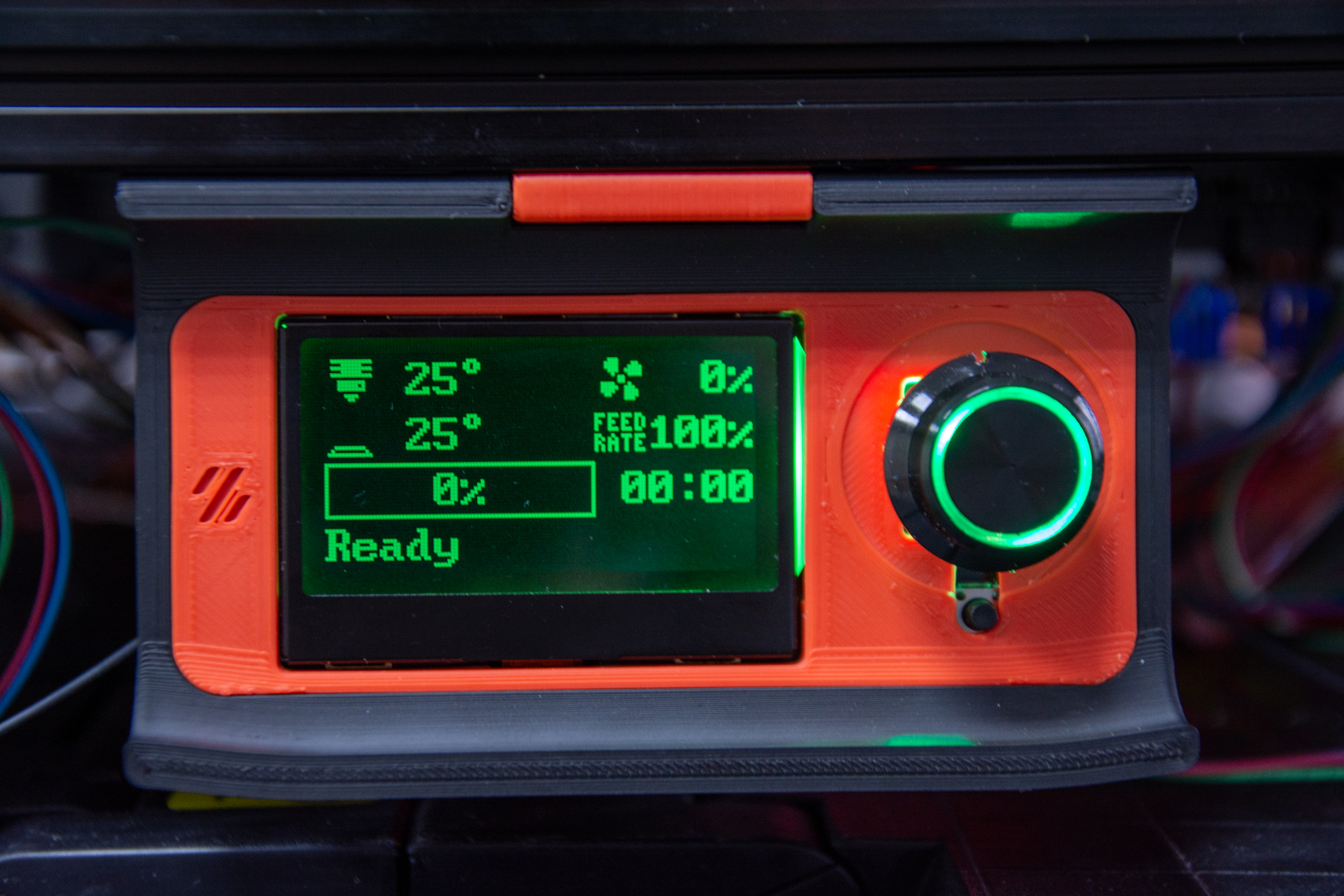
Voron status display

Voron 2.4 (Russian: ворон, raven) is a CoreXY 3D printer released in May 2020 by Voron Design. It has open-source software and hardware, and requires building by the user based on parts sourced individually or in kits from third-party vendors. The printer has been described as a resurgence of the RepRap culture.

An active user community maintains the specification, shares experiences, improvements and modifications. This contributes to continuous improvement, and there are several types of adaptations, extensions and further developments (for example, the StealthBurner interchangeable toolhead).

Voron 2.4 has a reputation for being complex to build and requiring considerable effort to operate. In return, its open specification and extensive use of off-the-shelf Hardware makes it highly maintainable, modular, and extensible.

== History ==
The Voron project was started by Russian Maks Zolin (pseudonym russiancatfood, RCF) who wanted a better, faster, and quieter 3D printer. He built a printer and started the company MZ-Bot based on open source ideology.

In 2015, the Voron Geared Extruder was released as the first design to use the Voron name. In 2015, Zolin sold the first 18 printers as kits (Voron 1.0, later renamed Voron Trident, and quite similar to the later Voron Legacy), and marked them with serial numbers. In March 2016, the first Voron printer was publicly released via the company MZ-Bot.

The V24 was an experimental model with a build volume of 24×24×24" (610×610×610 mm). Only two were built, laying the foundation for the later Voron2. By February 2019, over 100 Voron2 printers had been built and serialized, and a year later in 2020, the number had increased to 350 Voron2 printers. The Voron2.0 was never officially launched.

Zolin found that he did not want to run a company and instead decided to release his work freely, inviting others to collaborate with him. The tradition of marking new builds with serial numbers has lived on, and users who build their own Voron printer can be assigned their own serial number as proof of the hard work they have put into sourcing parts, assembling, and configuring the printer.

In May 2020, Voron2.4 was launched, and over 2500 printers were registered with serial numbers before the 2.4R2 version was launched in February 2022.

== Design ==
The Voron 2.4 is available as standard in the 250, 300 and 350 versions, which have build volumes of 250×250×250 mm (~15 L), 300×300×300 mm (~27 L) and 350×350×350 mm (~42 L), respectively. It features a closed build chamber, which provides stable temperatures that are favorable for certain types of 3D printing filament, reduces noise, and allows for controlled exhaust emissions (HEPA filter extensions are available).

The CoreXY design results in less moving mass, allowing for higher accelerations and speeds. The belt is based on the CoreXY pattern, but with the belts stacked on top of each other and without the crossover found in some other CoreXY designs, which allows for favorable motor placement. The build manual emphasizes that the two belts should be of the same make and have exactly the same length to achieve consistent tension.

The frame is constructed from lightweight and rigid 2020 aluminum profiles with 6 mm slots, which must meet certain requirements. Linear-motion guide rails of type MGN7, MGN9 or MGN12 are used along the three axes (alternatively guide rods can be used). The recommended belts are Gates Unitta 6 mm and/or 9 mm. A single stack of F695 flange bearings is often used for belt idlers, as the bearings are much larger than standard GT2 belt idlers.

Voron 2.4 has a flying gantry, which differs from most other "pioneer" CoreXY printers (like Rat Rig V-Core, VzBot 330 and Voron Trident). In other words, the 2.4 model has a stationary print plate and separate belts for moving the print head along the z-axis, while most other CoreXY printers on the other hand have a fixed gantry and a print plate that moves vertically with lead screws. A stationary print plate gives the possibility to use a heavier print plate (for example of thick steel instead of thin aluminium) that warps less when heated. It also gives a more space efficient frame, and makes it easier to calibrate the print to be parallel with the build plate (less need for bed mesh trimming). A disadvantage is that the z-axis may sag when the printer is not in use, but it shall straighten itself again when the printer is turned on.

All movement control is done with Klipper software on a Raspberry Pi, which provides great flexibility and extensibility through various parameters that can be programmed in a configuration file. The printer has the option of automatic calibration to compensate for unevenness in the build plate. Input shaping was introduced in 3D printers by Klipper in 2020, and is a standard feature on Voron.

== Construction and operation ==
The Voron 2.4 can be used for both hobby and professional small-scale production and prototyping. If using high-quality components and taking care to assemble them properly, one can achieve high speed, precision and reliability. Construction of the printer is time-consuming. Examples of things to pay attention to during construction are that the frame is square, using threadlock on screws and proper torque, using precise 3D printed parts, and connecting all the electrical components correctly.

== See also ==
- RepRap, project to create affordable 3D printers that can print most of their own components
- Prusa i3, Czech open source 3D printer
- Bambu Lab, Chinese manufacturer of proprietary CoreXY printers
