= Stall torque =

Produced by a mechanical device whose output rotational speed is zero

Stall torque is the torque produced by a mechanical device whose output rotational speed is zero. It may also mean the torque load that causes the output rotational speed of a device to become zero, i.e., to cause stalling. Electric motors, steam engines and hydrodynamic transmissions are all capable of developing torque when stalled.

Stall torque is often expressed in units of kg·cm.

== Electric motors ==
Electric motors continue to provide torque when stalled. However, electric motors left in a stalled condition are prone to overheating and possible damage since the current flowing is maximum under these conditions.

The maximum torque an electric motor can produce in the long term when stalled without causing damage is called the maximum continuous stall torque.

== Hydrodynamic transmissions ==
A hydrodynamic torque multiplier (torque converter) produces stall torque when the load prevents the turbine (output stage) from rotating while the pump (input stage) is being driven. In most cases, damage due to overheating occurs if the stall condition persists for any significant length of time.

== Combustion engines ==
In the case of a petrol (gasoline) or Diesel engine, the stall torque may refer to the torque load that causes the engine to stall. The actual amount of torque is dependent on engine RPM and throttle opening.
