= T-slot structural framing =

Framing system made of extruded aluminum

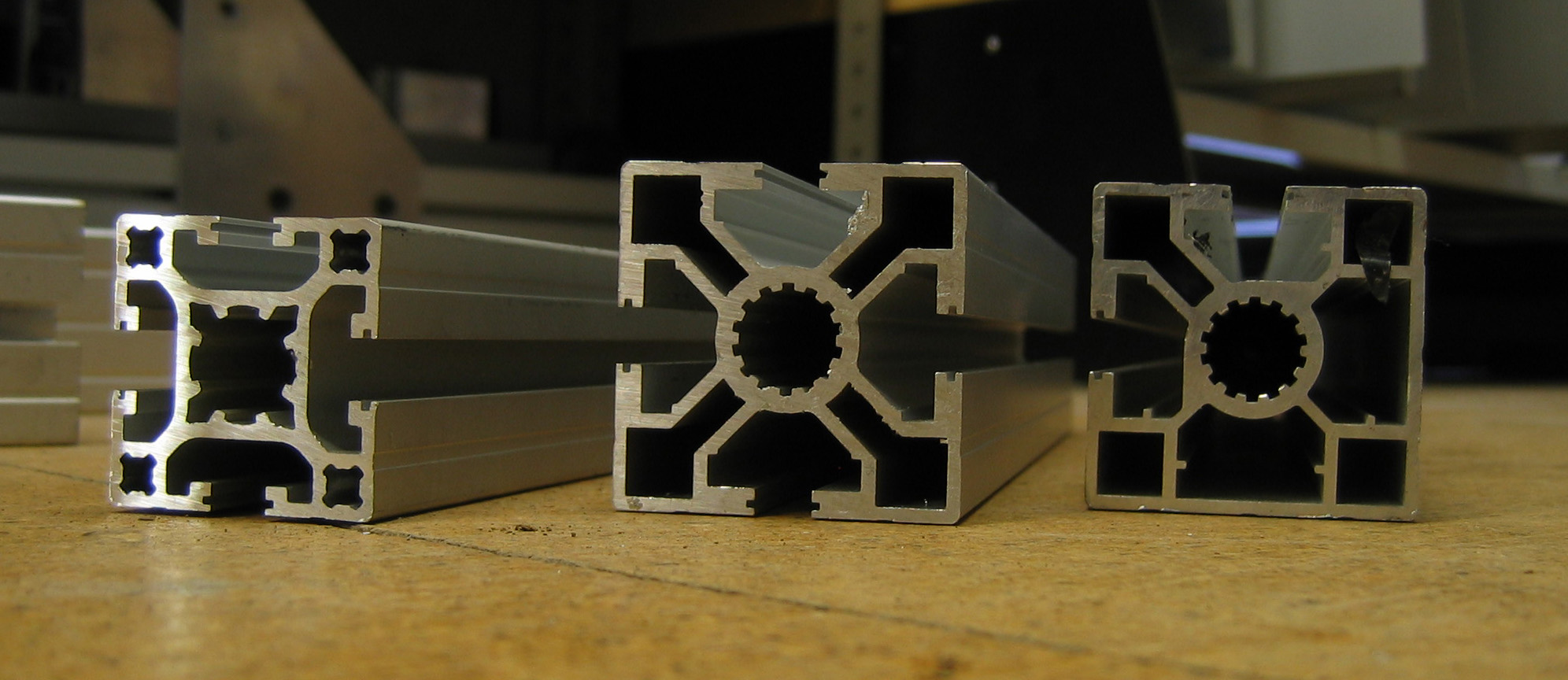
Examples of T-slotted profiles

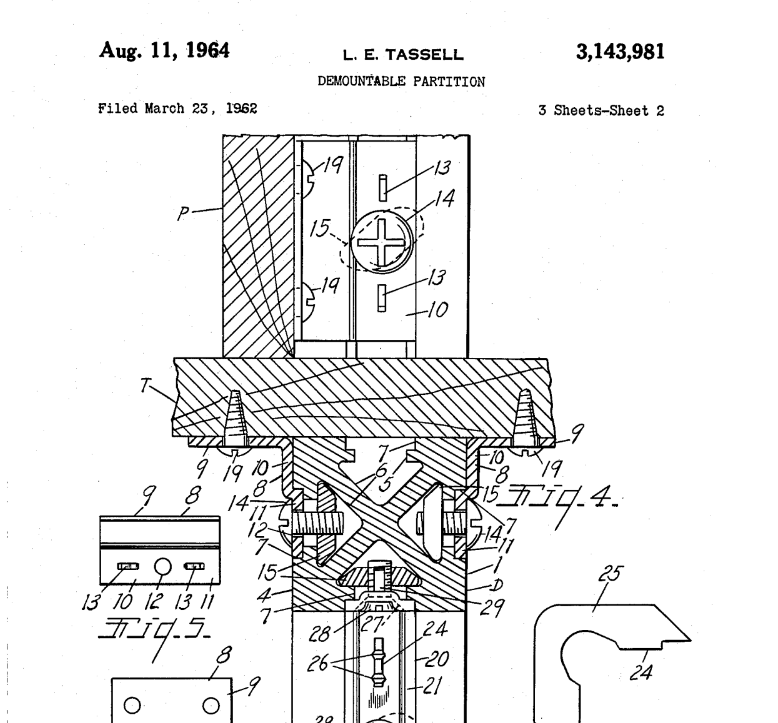
1964 patent demonstrating early use of extruded T-slot members.

Cross-section of 80/20 T-slotted profiles, 10 and 15 series

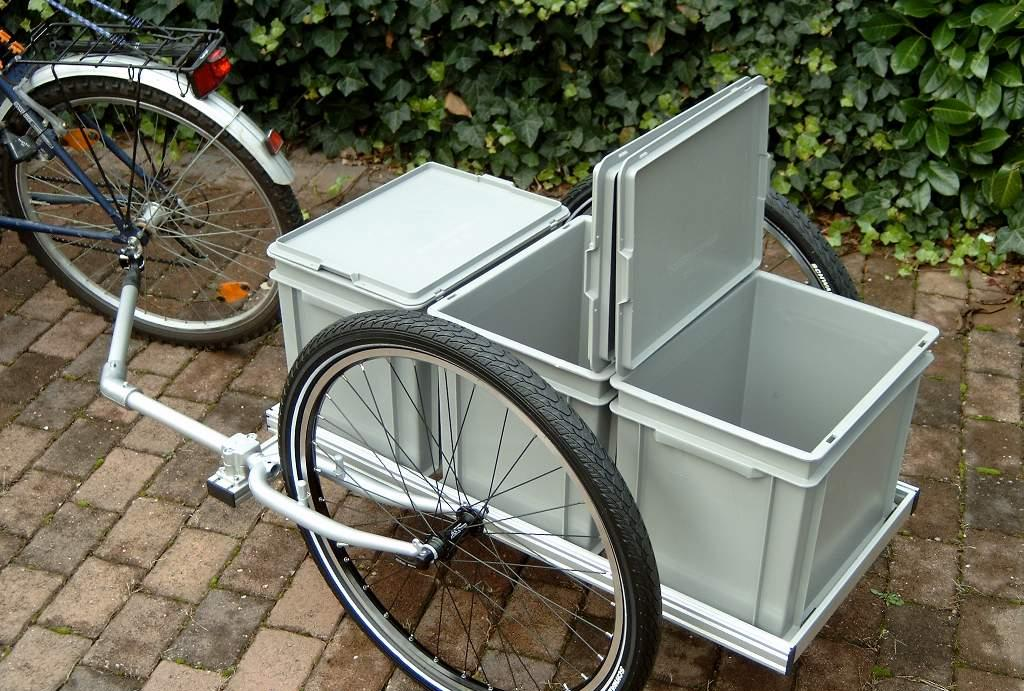
A bicycle trailer for bike-trekking with three Euroboxes and aluminium profile framing

T-slot structural framing is a framing system consisting of lengths of square or rectangular extruded aluminium, typically 6105-T5 aluminium alloy, with a T-slot down the centerline of one or more sides.

It is also known under several generic names, such as aluminium extrusion, aluminium profile and 2020 extrusion if the cross-section is 20x20 mm, alongside brand names, such as 80/20 framing.

While the precise history of the T-slot framing system is not known, advancement in extrusion press technology in the early 1950s allowed for economic production of aluminium profiles, and examples of use can be found from the early 1960s.

Although no published standard defines the system, it is produced in a series of conventional sizes which allows for compatibility between manufacturers.

There is a variation on T-slot profiles known as V-slot rails where V-slot wheels are slotted into the V-shaped channels of the framing for linear motion in a 3D printer or other CNC machine.

== Profiles ==
T-slot framing is divided into metric and fractional (imperial) categories. The T-slot is always centered along the long-axis of the piece. Pieces are available in each series with a square cross-section. Rectangular cross sections are also available which measure x by 2x (where x is the defined width) - e.g. 40mm by 80mm for 40 series.

Profile type	Profile name	Profile size
fractional	10 series	1"
fractional	15 series	1.5"
metric	20 series	20 mm
metric	25 series	25 mm
metric	30 series	30 mm
metric	40 series	40 mm
metric	45 series	45 mm

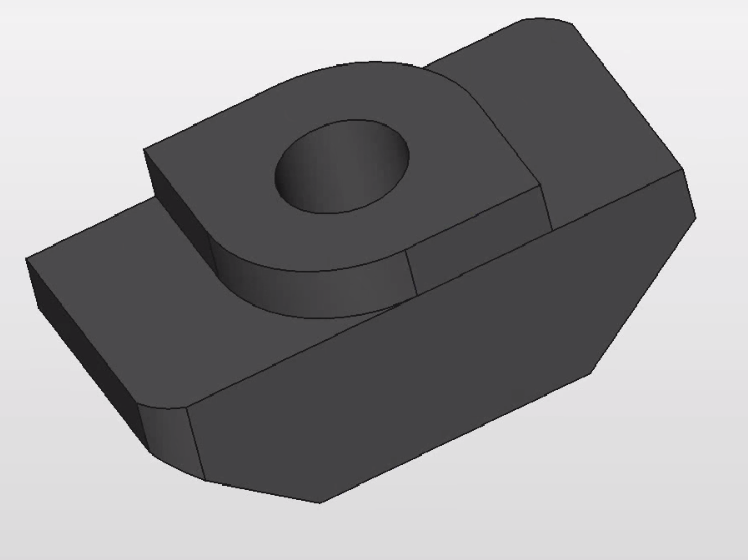
CAD model of a rotating T-slot nut used with aluminium T-slots/ T-track/ extrusions

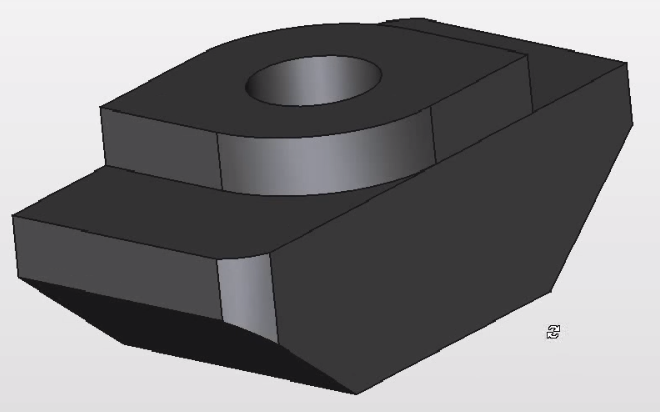

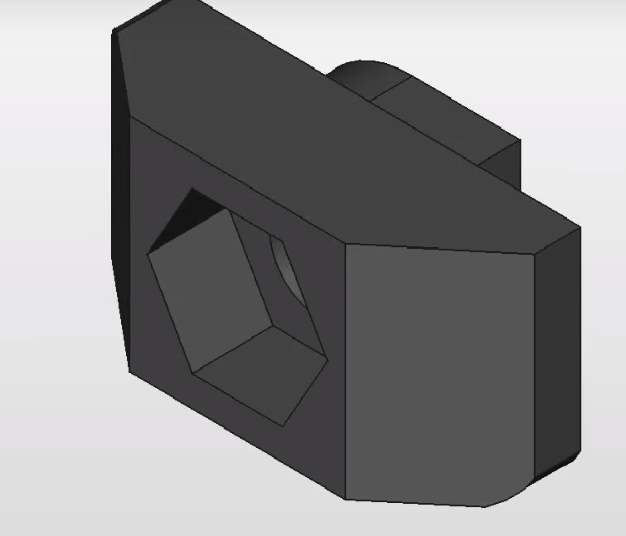

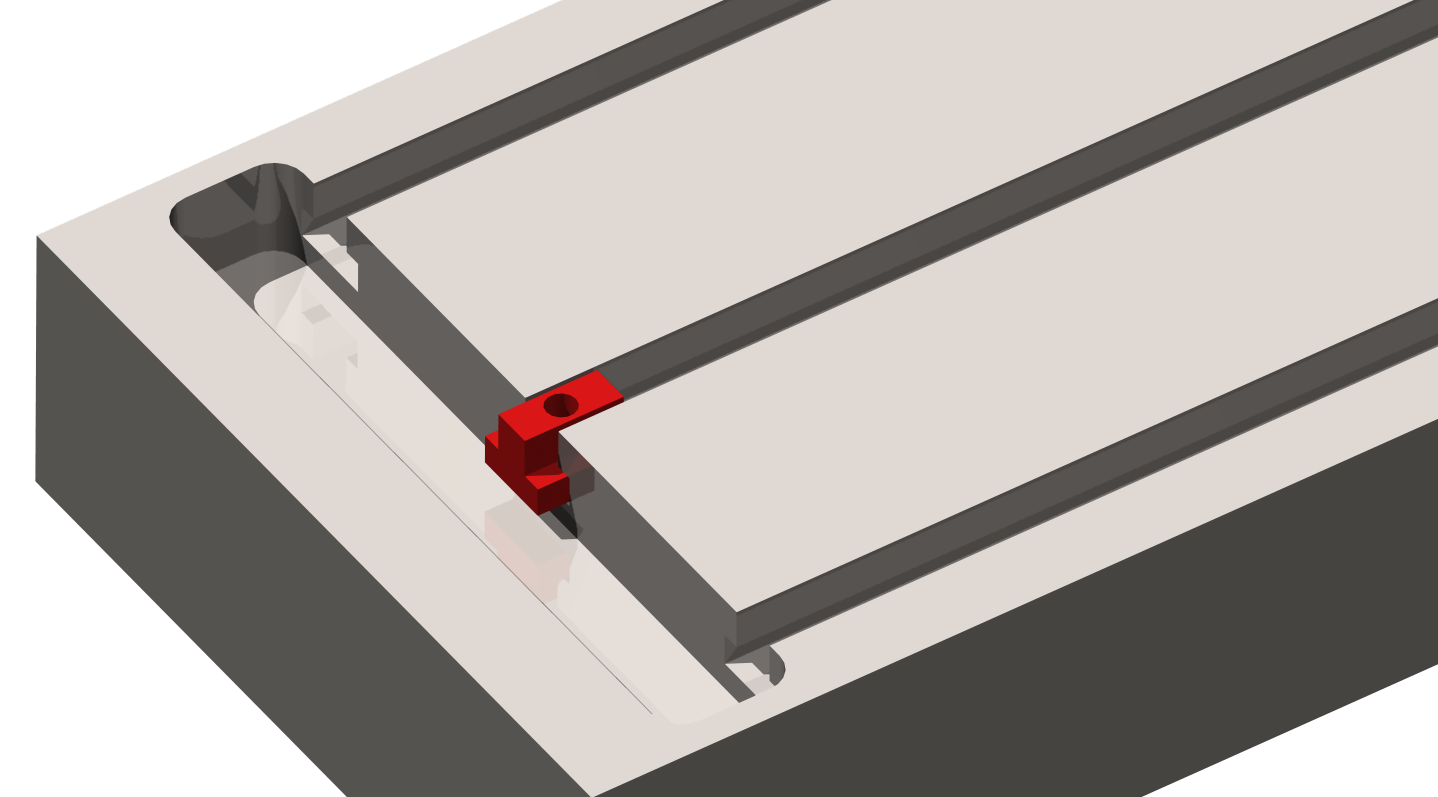
T-nut (red) installed in a T-slot

== See also ==
- T-slot nut
- Strut channel
