= MAD Studio =

Global Architecture firm

MAD Architects
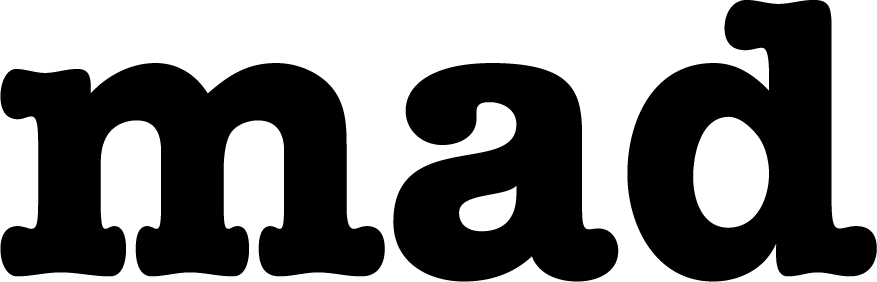
- Company type: Architecture & Design Practice
- Industry: Architecture, interior design, product design, furniture, planning, art installation
- Founded: 2004
- Founder: Ma Yansong
- Headquarters: Beijing, Los Angeles, & Rome
- Key people: Ma Yansong (Founder and Principal Partner); Dang Qun (Principal Partner), Yosuke Hayano (Principal Partner), Dixon Lu, Andrea D'Antrassi, Flora Lee, Tiffany Dahlen, Xu Chen, Fu Changrui, Kin Li, Liu Huiying
- Website: www.i-mad.com

MAD Architects (sometimes referred to as MAD) is a design practice led by founder Ma Yansong, and partners Dang Qun, and Yosuke Hayano.

== Significant Projects ==
- Lucas Museum of Narrative Art, On-going – Los Angeles, California, USA
- Jiaxing railway station – Jiaxing, China
- Harbin Opera House, 2015 – Harbin, China
- Tunnel of Light – Tokamachi, Japan
- Shenzhen Bay Cultural Plaza - Shenzhen, China
- Pingtan Art Museum - Pingtan, China
- Harbin Grand Theatre, Harbin, China
- China Wood Sculpture Museum, 2012 – Harbin, China
- Ordos Museum, 2011 – Ordos, China
- National Art Museum of China - Beijing, China
- Hutong Bubble, 2009 – Beijing, China
- Wormhole library, 2021 – Hainan

== Residential/Hospitality projects ==
- One River North (ongoing) – Denver, Colorado, USA
- Gardenhouse, 2020 – Beverly Hills, California, USA
- Huangshan Mountain Village, 2017 – Huangshan, China
- 71 Via Boncompagni, 2019 – Rome, Italy
- Sanya Phoenix Island, 2018 – Sanya, China
- UNIC (Parc Clichy-Batignolles), 2019 – Paris, France
- Baiziwan Social Housing, 2017 – Beijing, China
- Conrad Hotel, 2013 – Beijing, China
- Absolute Towers, 2012 – Mississauga, Canada
- Sheraton Huzhou Hot Spring Resort, 2012 – Huzhou, China
- Fake Hills, 2015 – Beihei, China
- Soho Shanghai – Shanghai, China
- Urban Forest, 2009 – Chongqing, China
- Taichung Convention Center – Tai Chung, Taiwan
- Hongluo Clubhouse – Beijing, China

== Commercial/Office projects ==
- Xinhee Research & Design Center, 2018 – Xiamen, China
- Chaoyang Park Plaza, 2017 – Beijing, China
- Nanjing Zendai Himalayas Center, Under construction – Nanjing, China
- Sino-Steel International Plaza & MGM Mirage, 2018 - Tianjin, China

== Educational projects ==
- Clover House, 2016 - Aichi, Japan

== Exhibitions ==
- 2016 "Invisible Border", Milan Design Week, Milan, Italy
- 2015 "MADe in China", Danish Architecture Center, Solo Exhibition, Copenhagen, Denmark
- 2015 "Architectures for Dogs", Shanghai Himalayas Museum, Shanghai, China
- 2015 Shenzhen & Hong Kong Bi-City Biennale of Urbanism Architecture, Shenzhen, China
- 2014 Shanshui City Exhibition, Solo Exhibition, Beijing, China
- 2014 “The Changing Skyline” - Beijing Design Week, Beijing, China
- 2014 “Future Cities -- High Mountain, Flowing Water” China Shan-Shui City Design Exhibition Berlin, Germany
- 2014 “Silhouette Shanshui”, “Across Chinese Cities - Beijing”, 14th Venice Architecture Exhibition Venice, Italy
- 2013 Shanshui City Exhibition, Solo Exhibition Beijing, China
- 2012 Between the Modernity and Tradition, Solo Exhibition, ICO Museum Madrid, Spain
- 2011 Verso Est: Chinese Architectural Landscape, MAXXI, Rome, Italy Rome, Italy
- 2010 "Feelings Are Facts", Ullens Center for Contemporary Art (UCCA), Exhibition with Olafur Eliasson, Beijing, China

== Art/Installation projects ==
- Super Star: A Mobile China Town, 2006-2018 - 11th Venice Architecture Biennale
- Rebuilt WTC - New York, USA
- Ink Ice, 2006 - Beijing, China
- Fish Tank, 2004
