= MixC Shenzhen Bay =

Shopping mall in Shenzhen, China

Coordinates: 22.5178°N 113.9387°E

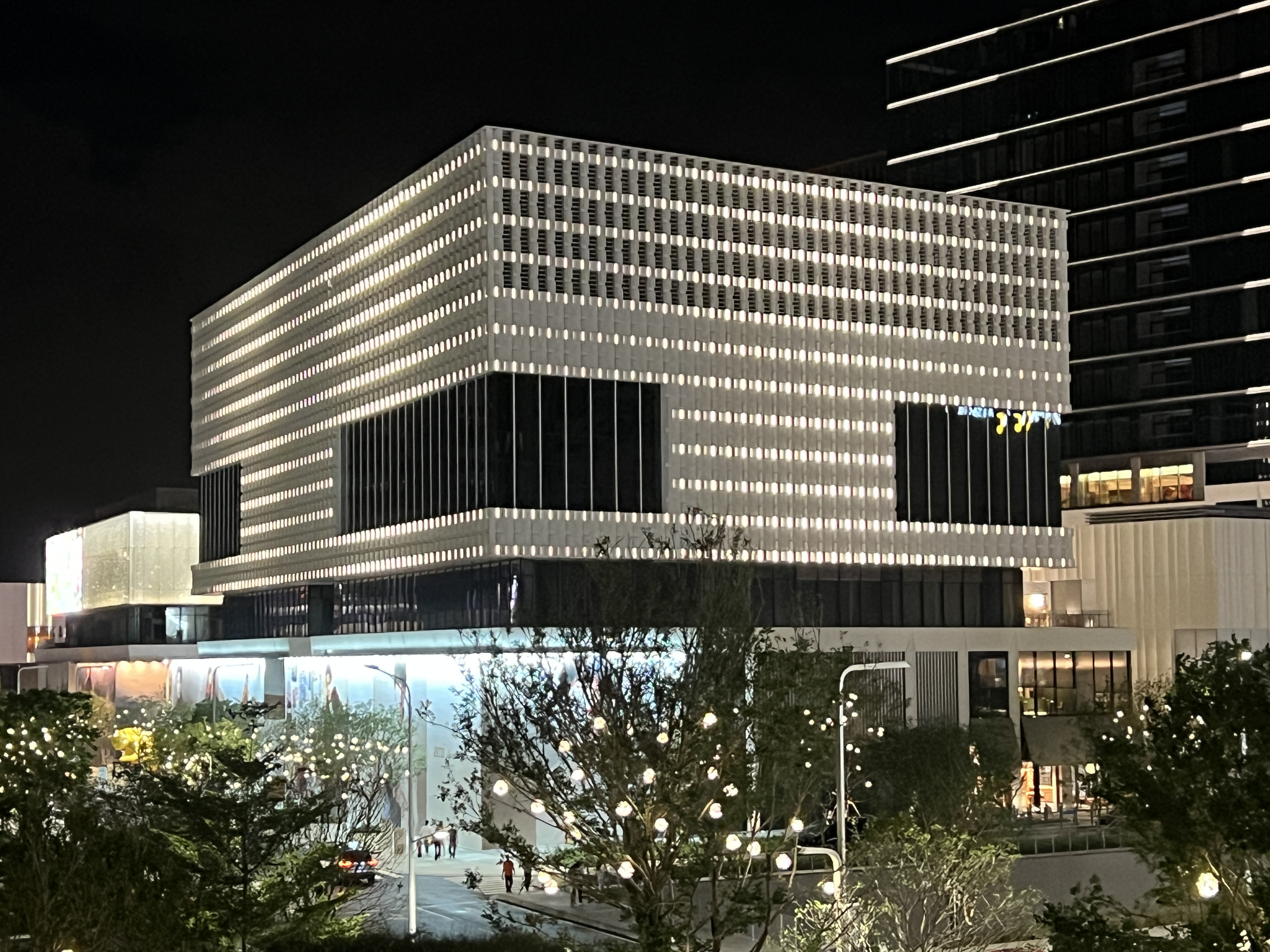
Shenzhen Bay MixC

Shenzhen Bay MixC (Chinese: 深圳湾万象城), originally named Nanshan MixC, is a large shopping mall located in Nanshan District, Shenzhen, China.

== Development and opening ==
Phase I architecture and interior design were carried out by Lead8, and it is operated by China Resources (Shenzhen) Co., Ltd., a subsidiary of China Resources Land Ltd. It opened on 28 December 2018.

Shenzhen Bay MixC is the second M1-level MixC mall in Shenzhen. Together with the landmark building China Resources Tower and the “Spring Cocoon” Shenzhen Bay Sports Center, it forms an urban complex with a total construction area of more than 700,000 square meters.

By turnover, Shenzhen Bay MixC is the shopping mall with the second-highest revenue in Shenzhen, second only to Shenzhen MixC. In 2023, its turnover reached 8.2 billion RMB.

On 30 September 2025, Phase II on the west side of Phase I opened. At the same time, the original Phase I was renamed Zone A, the southern part of Phase I became Zone B, the area west of Zone B became Zone C, and Zone D lies to the east side of Houhai Bin Road.

== Layout ==
The mall has a floor area of about 80,000 square meters and houses multiple flagship brand stores, a MixC cinema, Ole supermarket and numerous high-end restaurants. The basement level of the mall has passages directly connecting to the concourses of Shenzhen Metro Houhai Station Lines 2/8, Line 11 and Line 13.

== Gallery ==
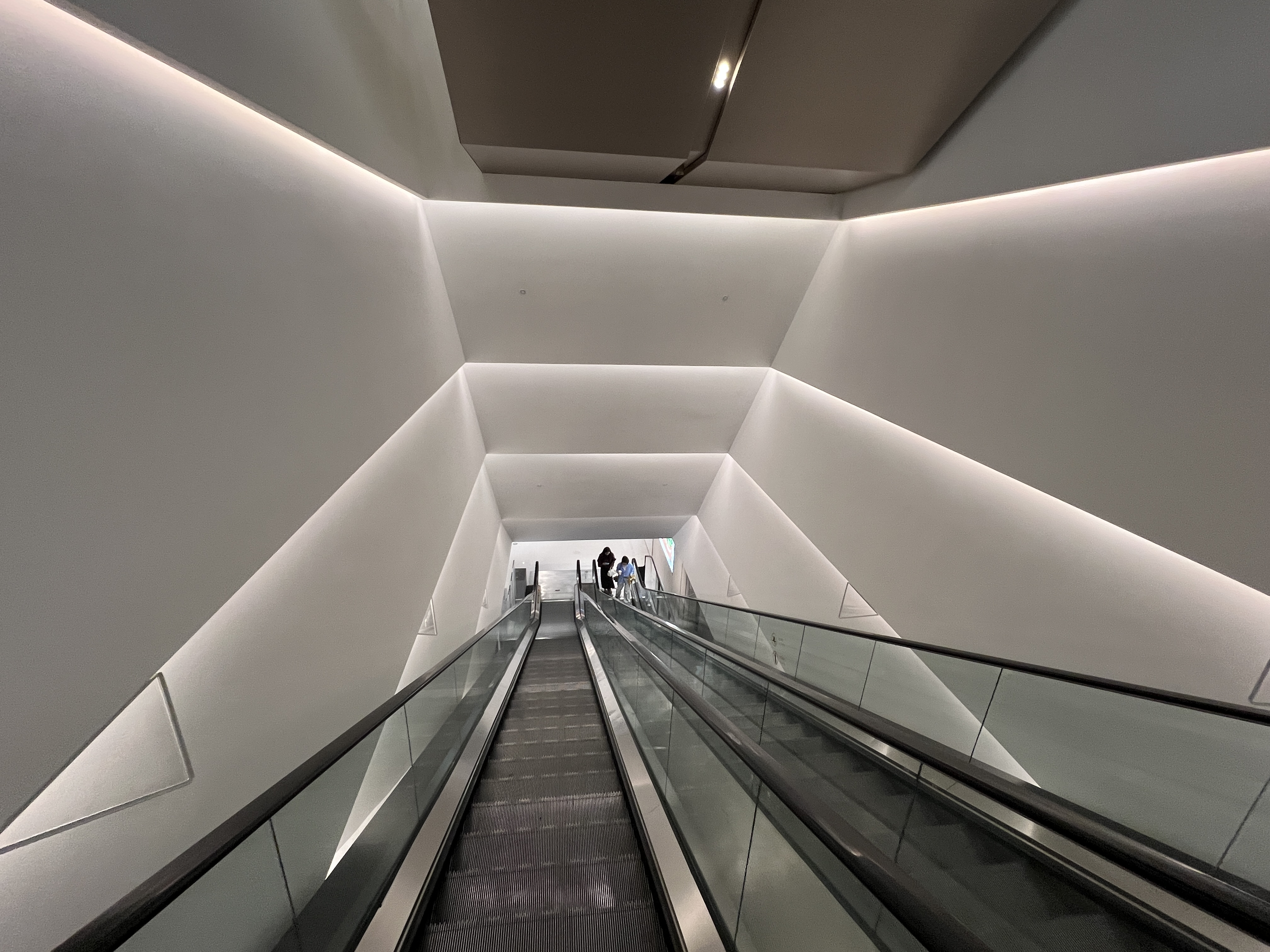
Escalators

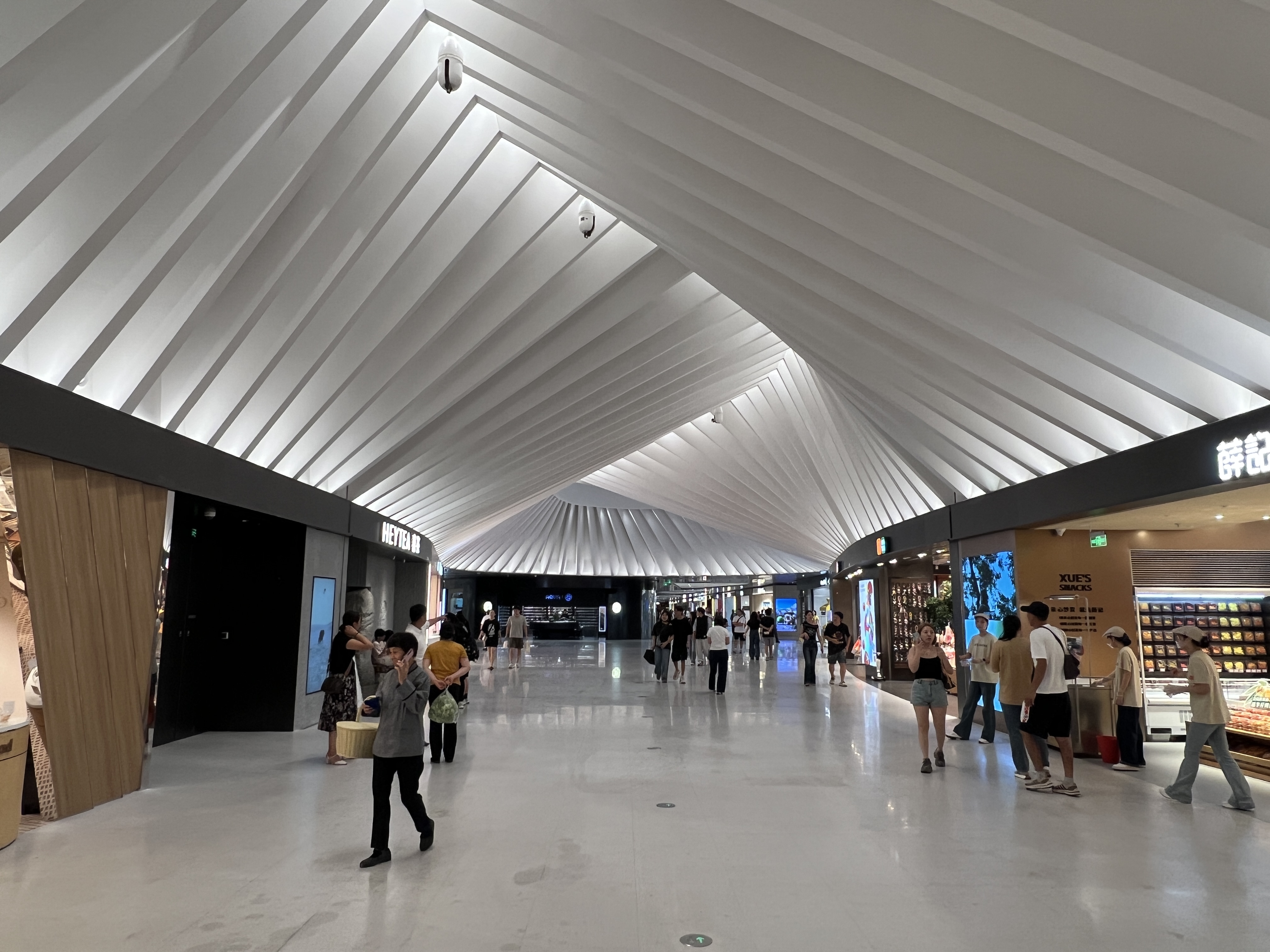
Interior of the mall

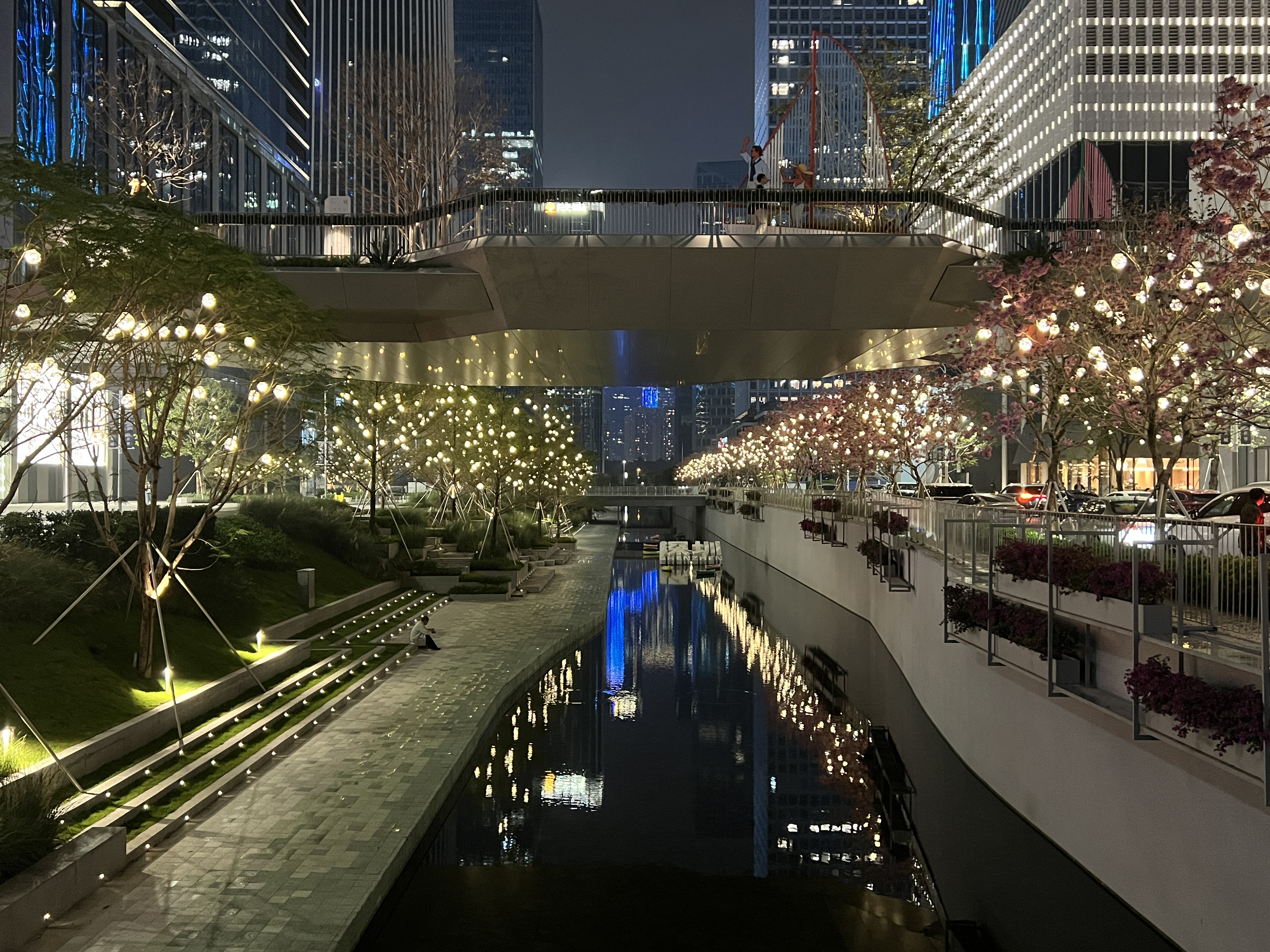
Houhai Canal

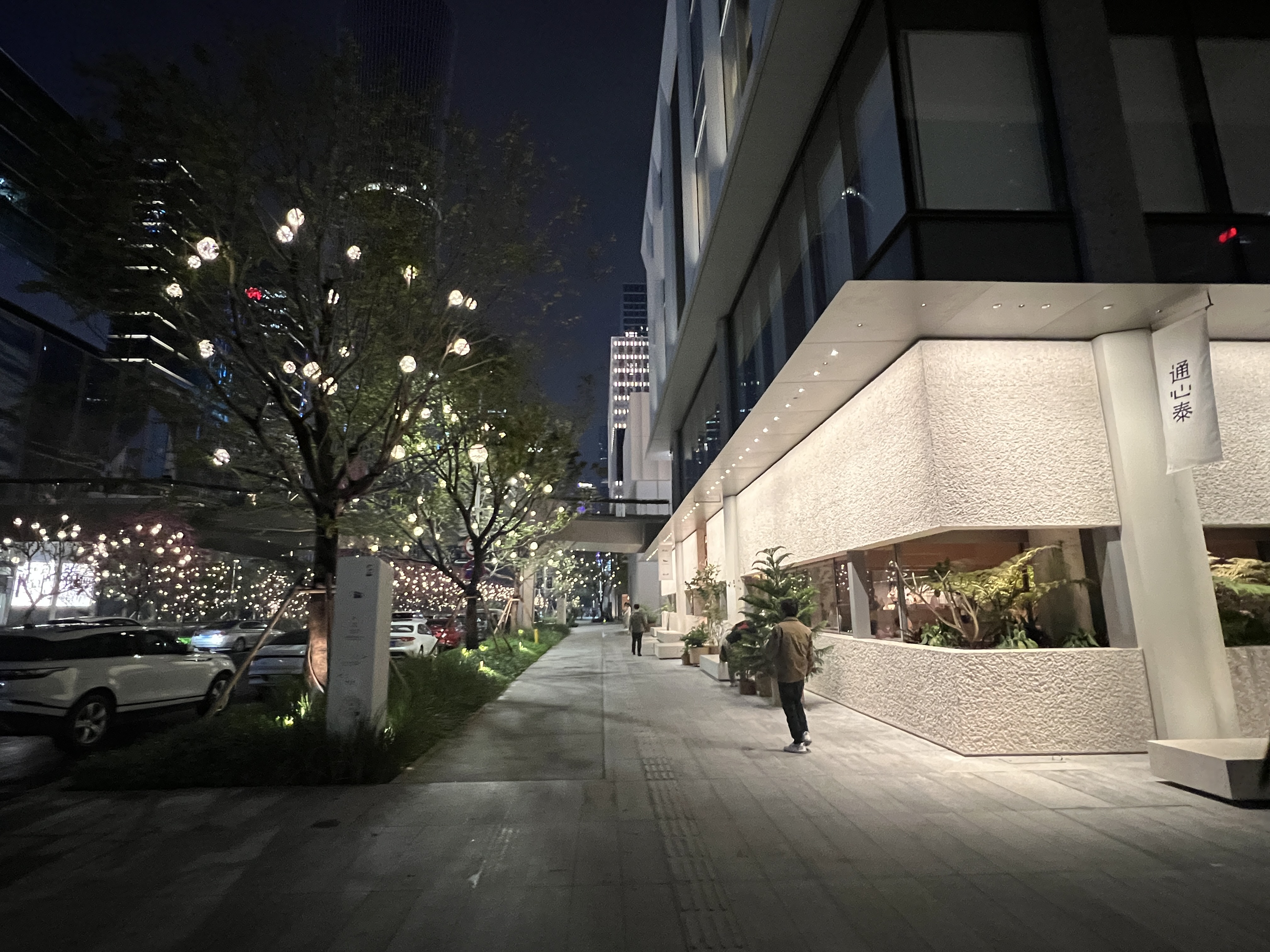
External street

== Nearby buildings ==
- China Resources Tower
- Shenzhen Bay Sports Center
- Shenzhen Talent Park
- Shenzhen Bay No.1
- Shenzhen Bay Cultural Plaza

== Transport ==
The mall is close to the Shenzhen Bay Port, about 10 minutes away by car. In addition, there are underground passages connecting to Line 2/Line 11/Line 13 Houhai station, and it is also served by several bus routes including M519, B964 and M347.
