= FOTP =

FOTP may refer to:

- Friends of the Parks, a watchdog group and environmental advocate for the Chicago area.
- Father of the Pride, a short-lived CGI animated television series that ran in 2004
- File-Oriented Transfer Program, a utility program for the OS/8 minicomputer operating system
- Friends of the People, an American sketch comedy program on truTV
