= Bambu Lab =

Chinese manufacturer of 3D printers

- Native name: 拓竹
- Industry: 3D printing
- Founded: August 2020; 6 years ago
- Headquarters: Shenzhen, China
- Parent: IDG Capital
- Website: bambulab.com

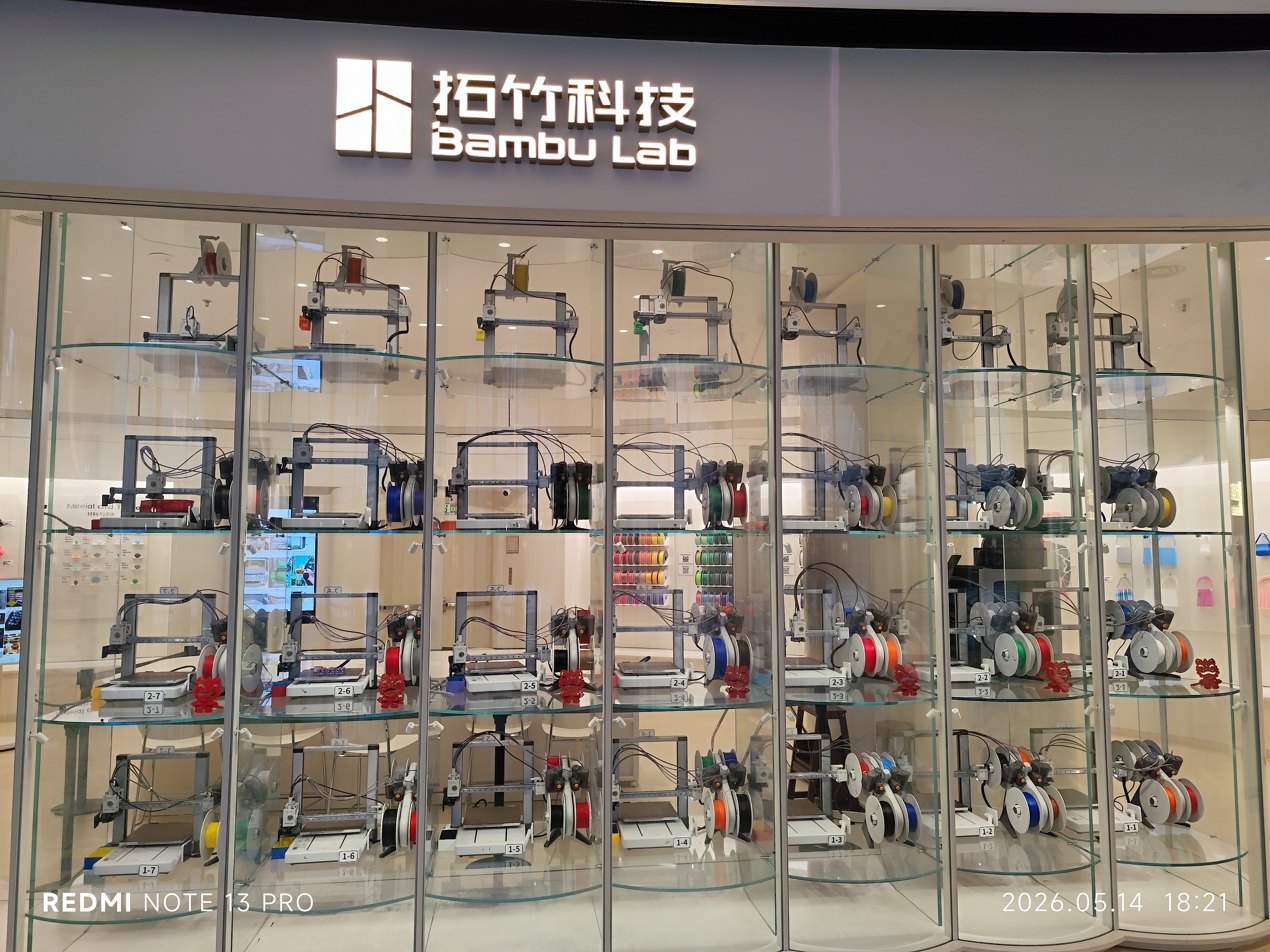
Bambu Lab's first physical retail in Shenzhen’s MixC World mall

Bambu Lab (Chinese: 拓竹; pinyin: Tuò zhú) is a consumer tech company that designs and manufactures desktop fused filament fabrication 3D printers. The company is based in Shenzhen, China, with additional locations in Shanghai and Austin, Texas. It was founded by a team of engineers from DJI.

== History ==
Bambu Lab was founded by four engineers led by Ye Tao. Tao was born and raised in China. Before he founded Bambu Lab, he worked at DJI as the head of DJI consumer drone department. In 2023, it was revealed that Bambu Lab was partially funded by IDG Capital, a global investment firm. In September 2025, they opened their first flagship store in MixC Shenzhen Bay.

== Products ==
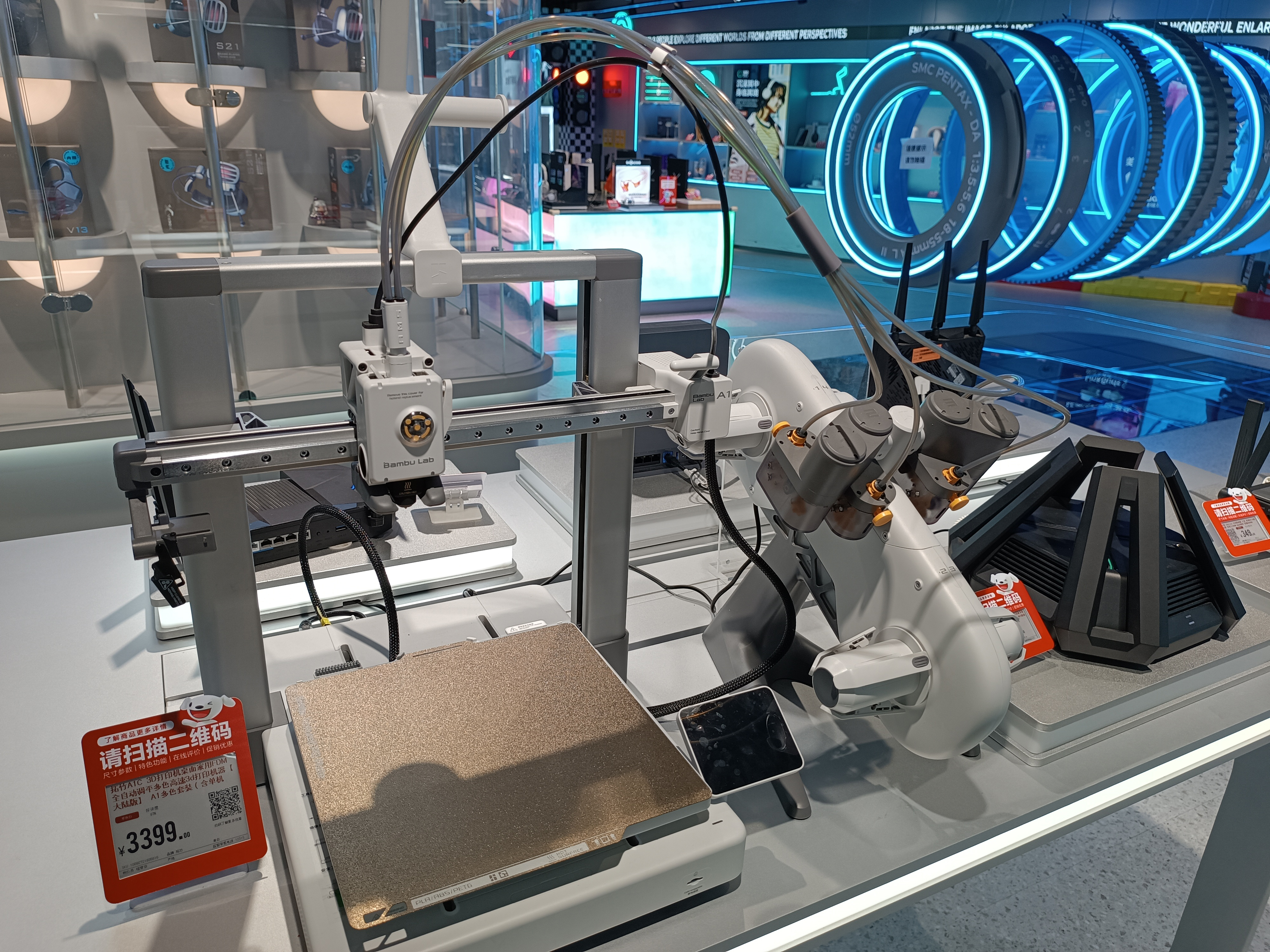
An A1 with an AMS lite

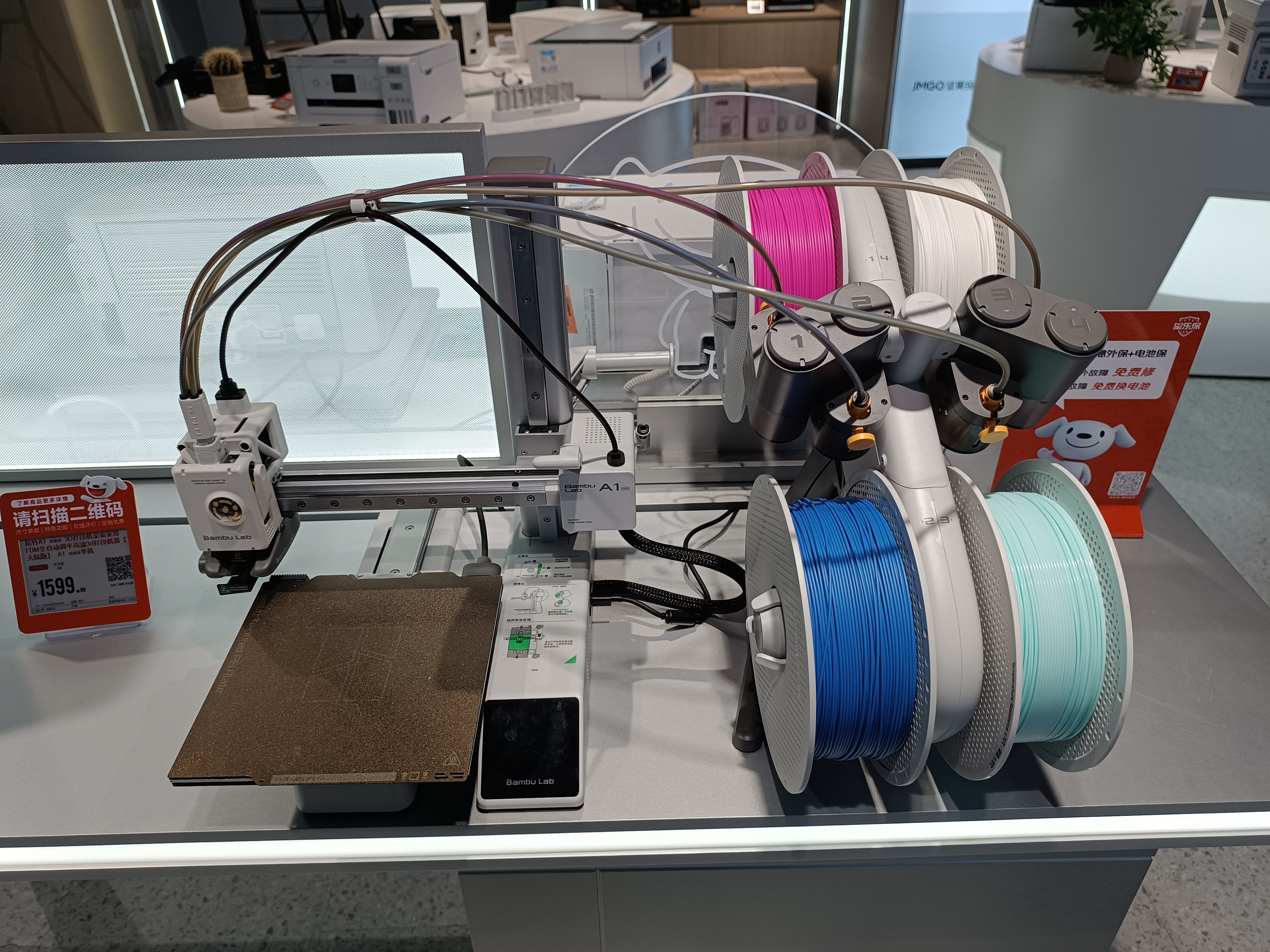
An A1 mini with an AMS lite

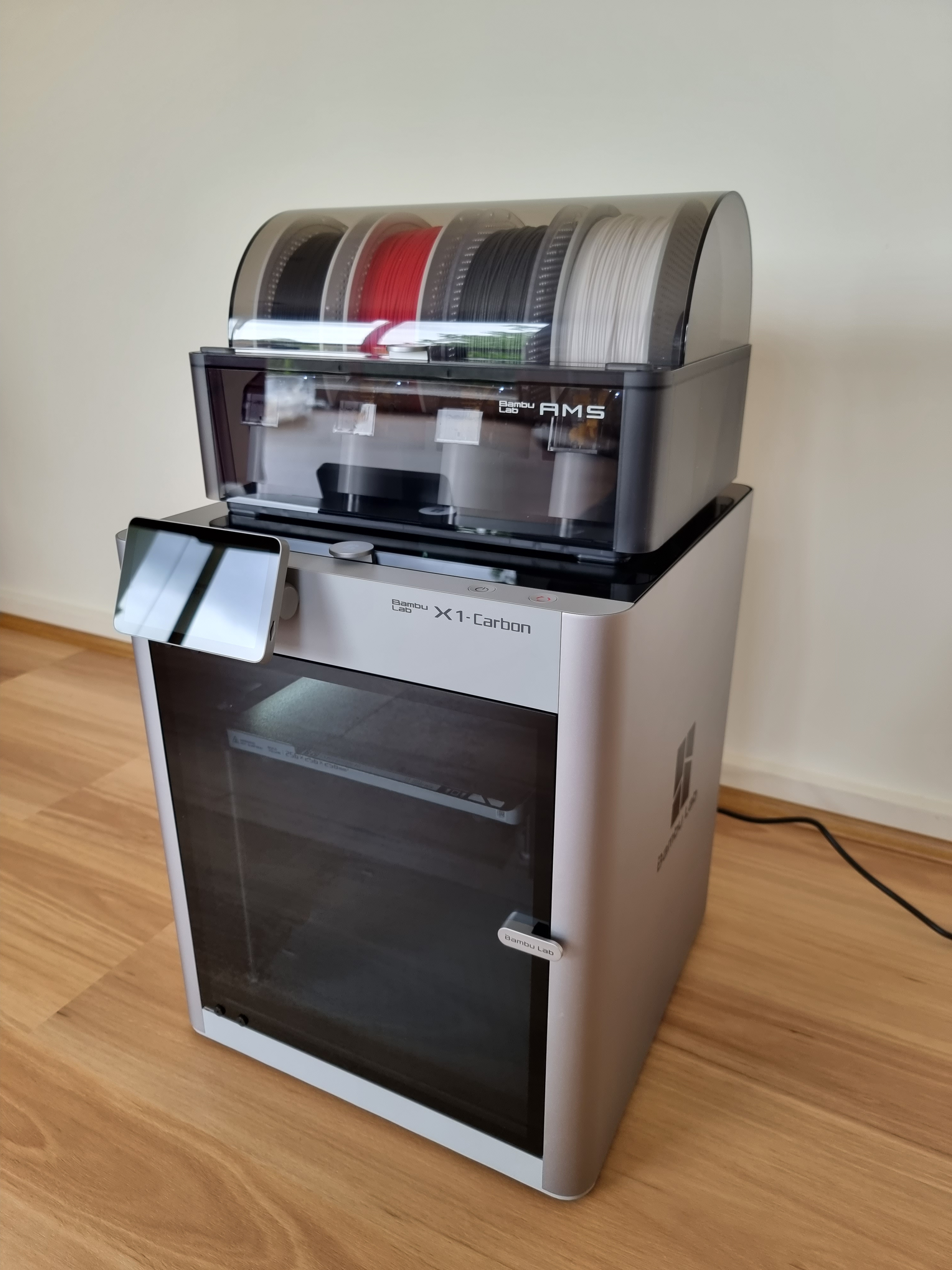
An X1 Carbon model with an AMS

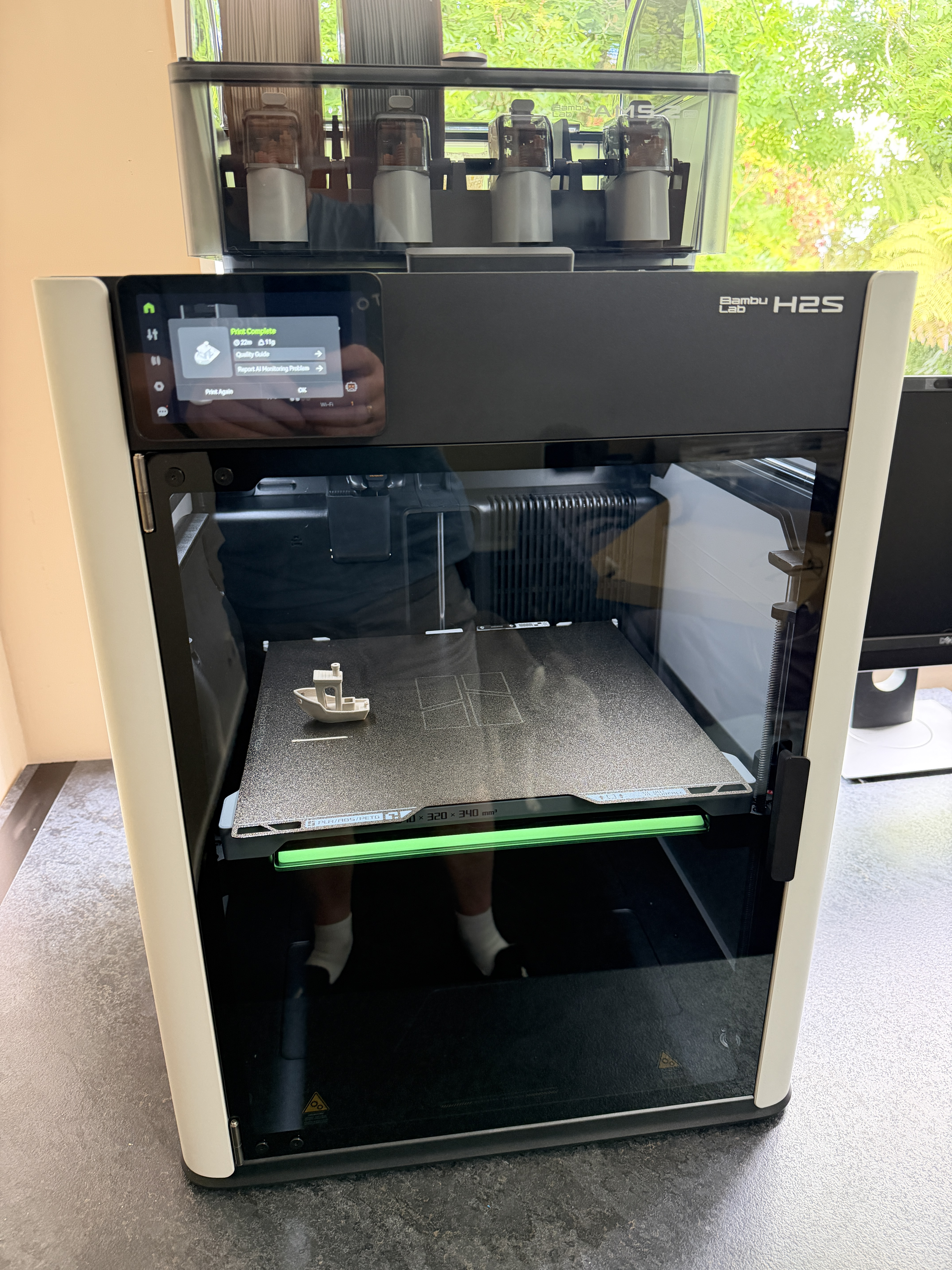
Bambu Lab H2S 3D printer

Video of Bambu lab X1 in printing operation

The company manufactures 3D printers, laser cutters, filament, and accessories for personal, commercial, and educational purposes.

=== Printers ===
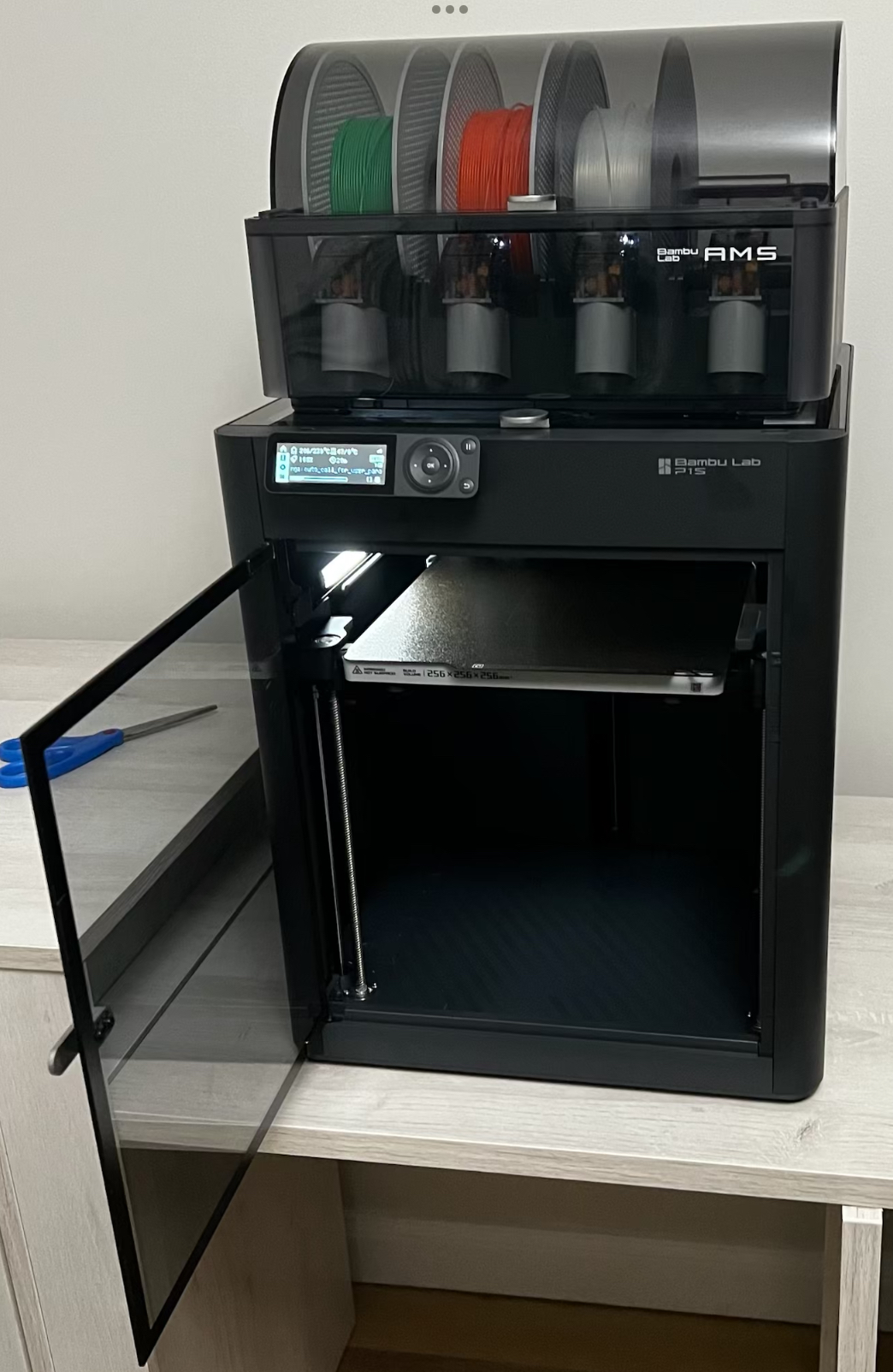
P1S 3D printer with AMS

| Series | Model | Release Date | Description |
|---|---|---|---|
| X | X1 | May 24, 2022 | An enclosed CoreXY printer with lidar-based bed leveling and first layer inspection. Features a 5-inch touchscreen, automatic calibration, and support for multi-filament printing through the optional Automatic Material System (AMS). It was Introduced through Kickstarter and raised HK$55 million (2022) (US$7.02 million). |
| X | X1-Carbon (X1C) | May 24, 2022 | A variant of the X1 designed for printing carbon- and glass-reinforced filament. Utilizes an aluminum enclosure, hardened steel nozzle, and auxiliary cooling fan. |
| X | X1E | October 10, 2023 | A variant of the X1-Carbon intended for professional enterprise use. Adds an Ethernet port, a hotter nozzle, and active chamber heating. |
| X | X2D | April 14, 2026 | A successor to the X1 lineup featuring a mixed direct drive- and Bowden-extruded dual nozzle. Changes include improvements to air filtration, thermal management, and speed. |
| P | P1P | November 18, 2022 | A cheaper, non-enclosed version of the X1C without a touchscreen or lidar sensor, alongside various other cost-cutting modifications. |
| P | P1S | July 13, 2023 | An enclosed variant of the P1P including an auxiliary cooling fan and air filter. |
| P | P2S | October 9, 2025 | A successor to the P1 lineup featuring a touchscreen, quick-swap nozzle, and improved airflow control. |
| A | A1 Mini | September 20, 2023 | An entry-level "bed slinger" printer with a cantilever gantry intended for printing small objects. |
| A | A1 | December 14, 2023 | A larger version of the A1 Mini with a standard two-tower gantry. |
| A | A2L | June 1, 2026 | A entry-level large format successor to the A1 lineup featuring a blade cutter and larger build volume. |
| H | H2D | March 25, 2025 | A large-format successor to the X1C with a direct-drive dual nozzle. The H2D Laser Edition adds laser, blade, and pen toolhead modules for cutting, engraving, and plotting. |
| H | H2D Pro | August 11, 2025 | A variant of the H2D with enterprise network control and tougher tungsten carbide nozzles. |
| H | H2S | August 26, 2025 | A single-nozzle variant of the H2D with its own H2S Laser Edition. |
| H | H2C | November 13, 2025 | A variant of the H2D featuring the "Vortek" automatic hotend swapping mechanism to hasten multi-filament printing and reduce waste. |
| H | H3C | November 3, 2026 | Bambu Lab's first tool-changer with the new "SwapTek" multi-material system |

==== Automatic Material System (AMS) models ====
| Model | Released With | Description |
|---|---|---|
| AMS | X1 | A four-spool filament storage and switching system with humidity monitoring and RFID logging. |
| AMS Lite | A1 Mini, A1 and A2L | A compact, open-air variant of the AMS with simpler filament routing. |
| AMS 2 Pro | H2D | A successor to the AMS with active filament drying and improved routing. |
| AMS HT | H2D | A single-spool filament storage system with high-temperature active drying. |
| AMS 3H | H3C | 9 spool storage, drying,and auto feeding just for the H3C |

=== Standalone Laser Cutters and Engravers ===
| Series | Model | Release Date | Description |
|---|---|---|---|
| R | R1 | September 22, 2026 | Bambu Lab's first standalone laser cutter and engraver. |

== Software ==
- Bambu Studio – Bambu Studio is an open-source slicing software. It also allows users to print models from the MakerWorld model library.
- Bambu Handy – Bambu Handy is a mobile app for a 3D printing service platform designed to let users control their printers remotely, connect to the MakerWorld models library, and print designs.
- Bambu Suite – Bambu Suite is a software that supports laser cutting, blade cutting and pen drawing. It is designed to integrate the whole design process into a single workflow. It supports computer-vision-based alignment.
- Bambu Farm Manager – Bambu Farm Manager is an application suite designed for managing multiple printers in commercial settings. It supports real-time printing status display, batch operations, printer firmware upgrade, print job queue management and multi-user management.
- Bambu Connect - Bambu Connect is an application that is designed to manage multiple printers in a non-commercial setting. It supports camera view, printer controls, and sending prints via .gcode.3mf files.
- MakerWorld - MakerWorld is a model-sharing library that can be accessed at its website or indirectly through other Bambu software such as Bambu Studio.
- Cyberbrick - Cyberbrick is a software that lets users print RC models, and code and control the electronics they can put in those models. Consumers can purchase kits with electronics compatible with cyberbrick at Bambulab Store.
- MakerLab - MakerLab is a fork of Bambu Lab's MakerWorld. It lets you easily design 3D files with their pre-made templates. No modeling skills required or complex knowledge of how to use it.

== Criticism ==
Bambu Lab's 3D printers have been criticized for their dependence on their cloud service. In August 2023, a Bambu Cloud outage caused some printers to print uncontrollably or cease functioning altogether.

In 2025, a security vulnerability was discovered in the cloud connection. Bambu Lab announced in a blog post that future firmware would be equipped with an authorization and authentication protection mechanism. Users feared that basic functions, such as printing over the local area network (LAN), would require authorization via the Bambu Cloud and restrict the use of third-party slicers. Bambu Lab later edited the original blog post to corroborate a newer post where they dismissed many concerns that users had, claiming they were the target of misinformation and cited their edited post as proof. However, the original unedited post, together with the terms of service, appeared to confirm or imply that these concerns were not unfounded.

Some users fear that Bambu Lab intends to force them into a cloud-based subscription model. Youtuber Louis Rossmann criticized Bambu Lab for restricting device functionality. He also noted that they have changed the terms of service without notice and removed evidence of the changes.

== See also ==
- Voron 2.4, a CoreXY printer with open source hardware and software
- Consumer Rights Wiki, for a wiki-page with more depth on Bambu Lab's legal issues
