= Ma Yansong =

Chinese architect

- 马岩松
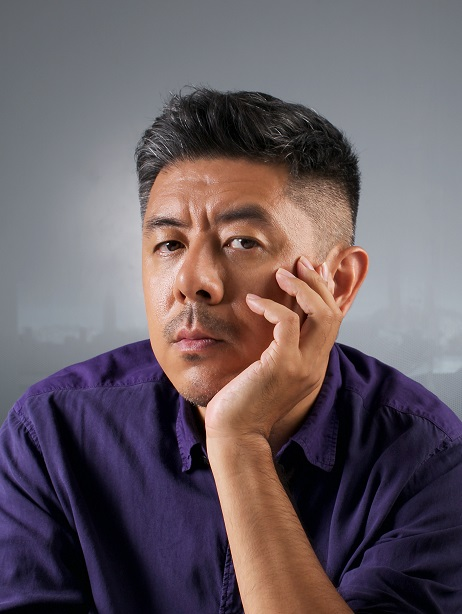
- Ma Yansong / MAD Architects
- Born: 1975 (age 50–51); Beijing
- Education: Yale University, Beijing University of Civil Engineering and Architecture
- Occupation: Architect
- Awards: Honorary FAIA, Time100 List of the world's most influential people, The World's Most Innovative People Awards, 2016 World Summit on Innovation and Entrepreneurship, Royal Institute of British Architects (RIBA) International Fellowship, Fast Company's 2023 Most Innovative Companies.
- Practice: MAD architects
- Buildings: Harbin Opera House, Yue Cheng Kindergarten Courtyard, Jiaxing Train Station, Quzhou Sports Park, FENIX Museum, Lucas Museum of Narrative Art, Tunnel of Light, Shenzhen Bay Culture Square
- Projects: Harbin Opera House, Yue Cheng Kindergarten Courtyard, Jiaxing Train Station, Quzhou Sports Park, FENIX Museum, Lucas Museum of Narrative Art, Tunnel of Light, Shenzhen Bay Culture Park

Ma Yansong (Chinese: 马岩松; pinyin: Mǎ Yánsōng) is the principal partner and founder of MAD Architects, a global design practice with offices located in Los Angeles, Rome, and Beijing. Renowned for his bold designs, Ma has led MAD in the creation of many significant structures around the world, including the Lucas Museum of Narrative Art, Harbin Opera House, Quzhou Stadium, FENIX Museum, The Yue Cheng Courtyard Kindergarten, Jiaxing Train Station, Shenzhen Bay Culture Square, One River North, and the Tunnel of Light. His design approach emphasizes a harmonious integration of urban landscapes, natural elements, and human experiences.

== Early life and background ==
Ma Yansong was born in Beijing in 1975. He holds a master's degree in Architecture from Yale University and a bachelor's degree from the Beijing University of Civil Engineering and Architecture. During his master's degree at Yale, he first received attention for his project "Floating Islands". Ma Yansong founded MAD Architects in 2004, and since then, has been internationally recognized. His influence extends across disciplines, including exhibitions, publications, product design, and the arts, reflecting a multidisciplinary vision that continues to shape global discourse.

== Recent Recognition ==
In 2025, Ma was named to the TIME100 list of the world's most influential people. That same year, he served as curator of the China Pavilion at the Venice Architecture Biennale, further cementing his role as a cultural voice on the international stage. In 2026, the American Institute of Architects (AIA) awarded him “Honorary FAIA.”

== Design philosophy: Shanshui City ==
The famous Chinese scientist Qian Xuesen proposed the concept of "Shanshui City" in the 1980s. As the world's largest manufacturing base, a large number of soulless "shelf cities" appeared in contemporary China due to the lack of cultural spirit. Qian Xuesen pointed out that modern cities' worship of power and capital leads to maximization and utilitarianism. "Buildings in cities should not become living machines. Even the most powerful technology and tools can never endow the city with a soul." To Ma Yansong, Shanshui does not just refer to nature; it is also the individual's emotional response to the surrounding world. "Shanshui City" is a combination of city density, functionality, and the artistic conception of natural landscape. It aims at composing a future city that takes human spirit and emotion at their cores.

The city of the future development will be shifted from the pursuit of material civilization to the pursuit of nature. This is what happens after human beings experience industrial civilization at the expense of the natural environment. The emotionally harmonious relationship between nature and man will be rebuilt upon the 'Shanshui City.'

The freedom and independence (in the siheyuan structure) have had a significant influence on my work. The idea of architecture coexisting with nature fascinates me. So much of today's architecture is like a consumer product – mass-produced. A mass-produced item has no spirit. It's disposable – something to be used once and then simply thrown away. [...] I want to create timeless designs that move with people and inspire people – to make them feel and think.

== Signature Projects ==
=== Architecture ===
- Absolute Towers, Mississauga, Ontario, Canada, 2006–2012, completed
  - Best Tall Buildings Americas, CTBUH "Council on Tall Buildings and Urban Habitat"
  - No.1, Skyscraper Awards 2012, EMPORIS.
  - Building of the Year 2012, ArchDaily.
- Ordos Museum, Ordos, China, 2005–2011, completed
  - Best Museum, UED
  - Winner of "Metal in Architecture", WAN Awards, 2014
- Hongluo Clubhouse, Beijing, China, 2005–2006, completed
- Sino-steel International Plaza, Tianjin, China, 2006
- Huangdu Art Center, Beijing, China, 2008
- Hutong Bubble 32, Beijing, China, 2008–2009, completed
- Fake Hills, Beihai, China 2008–2015, under construction
  - Best Architecture Multiple Residence, International Property Awards
- Harbin Opera House, Harbin, China, 2008–2015, completed
- Taichung Convention Center, Taiwan, 2009
- Harbin China Wood Sculpture Museum, Harbin, China, 2009–2012, completed
- Huangshan Mountain Village, Huangshan, China, 2009–2016, under construction
  - 2012 Top 10 Conceptual Architecture, Designboom
- Urban Forest, Chongqing, China, 2009
- National Art Museum of China, Beijing, China, 2011
- Pingtan Art Museum, Pingtan, China, 2011–2016
- Chaoyang Park Mixed-use, Beijing, China, 2013–2016
  - D21 Chinese Architecture Design in 21st Century, Beijing Design Week
  - Chinese Top 10 Buildings
- Nanjing Zendai Himalayas Center, Nanjing, China, 2013–2017
- Vertu, travelling Pavilion, Milan, Shanghai, Dubai, Beijing, London
- Beijing 2050, Beijing, China
- Rebuilt WTC, New York, USA
- 800m Tower, China
- Changsha Culture Park, Changsha, China
- KBH Kunsthal, Urban intervention, Copenhagen, Denmark
- Lucas Museum of Narrative Art, Los Angeles, USA

=== Art ===
- Shanshui – Experiment – Complex, Shenzhen, China, 2013
- Moon Landscape, Beijing, China, 2013
- "Shanshui City" Exhibition, Beijing, China, 2013
- "Shansui City" for Audi City, Beijing, China
- The Little Rock Fountain Journal
- "The Floating Earth" for Alessi
- Contemplating the Void in Guggenheim, New York, USA, 2009
- Feelings are facts, Beijing, China, 2010
- Monster's Footprint, Shenzhen, China, 2009
- Superstar: A Mobile Chinatown (Uneternal City), Venice, Italy, 2008
- Ink Ice, Beijing, China
- Fish Tank

== Awards and honors ==
- 2026 Honorary Fellowship of American Institute of Architects (H.FAIA)
- 2025 TIME100 list of the world's most influential people
- 2023 Kalmanani National Architecture Award, Mexico
- 2020 AD100 China's most influential designers
- 2018 Prix Versailles World Judge
- 2016 40 Most Famous Architects of the 21st Century, Archute
- 2016 The World's Most Innovative People Awards, World Summit on Innovation and Entrepreneurship
- 2016 Los Angeles "City Recognition" Medal
- 2015 Power 100, Surface Magazine
- 2015 Global Design Power, Interni Magazine
- 2015 Most Influential Chinese Architects, Forbes China Edition
- 2014 100 Most Creative People in Business, Fast Company
- 2014 Chaoyang Park Plaza: Chinese Top 10 Buildings
- 2014 Sheraton Huzhou Hot Spring Resort: No.3, Skyscraper Awards 2013, EMPORIS
- 2013 Designer of the Year, Good Design
- 2013 D21 Young Chinese Architect Award
- 2013 Emporis for the world's best new skyscraper (Absolute Towers)
- 2013 2nd Audi Arts and Design Award in the category Designer of the Year
- 2012 The Best New High-rise Building in the America's by the CTBUH "Council on Tall Buildings and Urban Habitat", (Absolute Towers)
- 2012 International Property Awards (Fake Hills)
- 2011 UED museum award (Ordos Museum)
- 2011 RIBA International Fellowship
- 2011 Fast Company – one of 10 most innovative companies in China
- 2009 Fast Company – one of 10 creative people in architecture
- 2008 ICON magazine – one of 20 most influential young architects
- 2006 Architecture League Young Architects Award
- 2001 American Institute of Architects Scholarship for Advanced Architecture Research

== Exhibitions ==
- 2025 Co-Exist: Pavilion of China, La Biennale di Venezia, Venice, Italy
- 2025 Ma Yansong: Architecture and Emotion, Nieuwe Instituut, Rotterdam, Netherlands
- 2023 Ma Yansong: Landscape in Motion, Shenzhen Contemporary Art and Urban Planning Museum, Shenzhen, China
- 2022 Close-up – One Hundred Art Practices in Beautiful Chin”, China International Design Museum, Hangzhou, China
- 2022 Timeless Beacon, Nanhai Land Art Festival, China
- 2022 Dynamik Chair, Milan Design Week, Italy
- 2022 Shenzhen-Hong Kong City Architecture Biennale, Shenzhen, China
- 2022 Blueprint Beijing”, the architecture exhibition of the first Beijing Biennial (2022), China
- 2021 Art at FULIANG 2021, Jingdezhen, China
- 2021 NINE TIERED PAGODA – Spatial and Visual Magic, Shenzhen, China
- 2021 Light Hanxi Village Art Project, Jingdezhen, China
- 2021 2021 Chengdu Biennale, Tianfu Art Museum, Chengdu, China
- 2021 Rural Reconstruction in China – The Practice of Art, Space and Place”, Jiangxi Academy of Fine Art Museum, Jingdezhen, China
- 2020 Design and the Wondrous”, Centre Pompidou X West Bund Museum Project, Shanghai, China
- 2020 Values of Design: China in the Making, Design Society, Shenzhen, China
- 2019 Future and the Arts: AI, Robotics, Cities, Life – How Humanity Will Live Tomorrow, Mori Art Museum,Tokyo, Japan
- 2019 MAD X, Centre Pompidou, Paris, France
- 2018 Tunnel of Light, Echigo Tsumari Art Field Triennale, Japan
- 2018 Fifth Ring, Milan Design Week, Milan, Italy
- 2018 Reconstructing Utopia, OCT Art and Design Gallery, Shenzhen, China
- 2018 Brazil Curitiba Biennale, Curitiba, Brazil
- 2017 Shanghai Urban Space Art Season, Shanghai, China
- 2017 MAD Martian, Design Miami, Basel, Switzerland
- 2017 New Museums: Intentions, Expectations, Challenges, Art Centre Basel, Basel, Switzerland
- 2017 Beazley Designs of the Year, Design Museum, London, UK
- 2016 Zai Xing Tu Mu. Sixteen Chinese Museums, Fifteen Chinese Architects, Aedas Architecture Forum, Berlin, Germany
- 2016 Towards a Critical Pragmatism: Contemporary Architecture in China, Harvard Graduate School of Design, Boston, USA
- 2016 Invisible Border, Milan Design Week, Milan, Italy
- 2016 Micro Garden, 15th Venice Architecture Biennale, Venice, Italy
- 2015 Shenzhen & Hong Kong Bi-City Biennale of Urbanism\Architecture, Shenzhen, China
- 2015 Architecture for Dogs, Shanghai Himalayas Museum, Shanghai, China
- 2014 Chengnan Project: Qianmen Xianyukou Masterplan, Beijing Center of the Arts (BCA), Beijing, China
- 2014 Shanshui City Exhibition, Solo Exhibition, Ullens Center for Contemporary Art (UCCA), Beijing, China
- 2014 "The Changing Skyline", Beijing Design Week, Beijing, China
- 2014 "Future Cities — High Mountain, Flowing Water" China Shan-Shui City Design Exhibition, Berlin, Germany
- 2014 Building M+: The Museum and Architecture Collection, Hong Kong, China
- 2013 Shenzhen & Hong Kong Bi-City Biennale of Urbanism\Architecture, Shenzhen, China
- 2013 West Bund 2013: A Biennial of Architecture and Contemporary Art, Shanghai, China
- 2013 Palace of China – Architecture China 2013 exhibition, Segovia, Spain
- 2013 Shanshui City Exhibition, Solo Exhibition, Beijing, China
- 2012 Between the Modernity and Tradition, Solo Exhibition, ICO Museum, Madrid, Spain
- 2011 Shenzhen & Hong Kong Bi-City Biennale of Urbanism\Architecture, Shenzhen, China
- 2011 Beijing Design week, Beijing, China
- 2011 Chengdu Biennale: Changing Vistas: Creative Duration, Chengdu, China
- 2011 Living, The Louisiana Museum of Modern Art, Copenhagen Denmark
- 2011 Verso Est: Chinese Architectural Landscape, MAXXI, Rome, Italy
- 2010 Rising East: New Chinese Architecture, Vitra Design Museum, Weil am Rhein, Germany
- 2010 Feelings Are Facts, Olafur Eliasson+Ma Yansong, UCCA, Beijing, China
- 2009 Contemplating the Void: Interventions in the Guggenheim Museum, New York, USA
- 2008 Super Star, A Mobile China Town, Uneternal City, 11th Venice Architecture Exhibition, Italy
- 2008 China Design Now, Victoria and Albert Museum, London, UK
- 2007 MAD IN CHINA, solo exhibition, Danish Architecture Centre (DAC), Copenhagen, Denmark
- 2006 Shanghai Art Biennale, Shanghai, China
- 2006 MAD IN CHINA, Solo exhibition, Diocesi Museum, Venice, Italy
- 2006 MAD Under Construction, Solo Exhibition, Tokyo Gallery, Beijing, China
- 2004 1st Architecture Biennial Beijing, National Art Museum of China, Beijing, China

== Quotes ==
- RIBA President Ruth Reed, in the jury report for the 2010 RIBA international Fellowship:

"Ma Yansong is a young Chinese architect – just 35 – who has come to architectural maturity at a time when his country is beginning to allow the freedom of expression so vital to the artist and sufficient freedom to the economy to allow his ideas to be realized as buildings. His work expresses the tension between the individual imagination and the needs of society as a whole."
