= Lucas Museum of Narrative Art =

Museum of visual storytelling in Los Angeles, United States

- An architectural rendering of the museum
- Established: September 22, 2026
- Location: One Lucas Plaza, Exposition Park, Los Angeles, California, United States
- Coordinates: 34°0′55″N 118°17′27″W
- Type: Art museum
- Founders: George Lucas; Mellody Hobson
- Public transit access: Expo/Vermont
- Website: lucasmuseum.org

The Lucas Museum of Narrative Art is a museum founded by filmmaker George Lucas and his wife, businesswoman Mellody Hobson. It opened on September 22, 2026.

The museum showcases visual storytelling, including painting, photography, sculpture, illustration, comic art, performance, and video. It is located in Exposition Park in Los Angeles, California.

== Collections ==
The Lucas Museum houses works by artists such as Judy Baca, N.C. Wyeth, Carrie Mae Weems, Diego Rivera, Norman Rockwell, Frank Frazetta, Ralph McQuarrie, Jacob Lawrence, Kadir Nelson, Paul Cadmus, Yinka Shonibare, and Jack Kirby. In 2021, the museum announced the acquisition of the archive of materials related to the development and execution of Judy Baca's half-mile-long mural The History of California, popularly known as the Great Wall of Los Angeles, located in the San Fernando Valley. Also in 2021, the museum acquired Robert Colescott's painting George Washington Carver Crossing the Delaware River: Page from an American History Textbook.

In 2019, the museum acquired the Separate Cinema Archive, which includes posters, lobby cards, film stills, scripts, and other artifacts that track the history of African American cinema from 1904 to contemporary era. In total, the archive contains about 37,000 objects. Dorothy Dandridge, Paul Robeson, Duke Ellington, Sidney Poitier, and Josephine Baker are among the stars whose work is documented in the collection.

To curate the Lucas Archives, George Lucas donated his valuable personal collection that includes Star Wars, Indiana Jones, Alice's Adventures in Wonderland and Peanuts props and memorabilia.

== History ==
The first president of the museum was Don Bacigalupi, former president of Crystal Bridges Museum of American Art in Bentonville, Arkansas. He stepped down from this role in early 2019. In October 2019, Sandra Jackson-Dumont was announced as director and CEO. In March 2025 she stepped down from the role. Then Jim Gianopulos became interim CEO. In December 2025 chief curator Pilar Tompkins Rivas also left the museum. As of September 2026, Tracey Bates was serving as CEO of the Lucas Museum of Narrative Art.

=== Proposed sites ===
Originally known as the Lucas Cultural Arts Museum, it was initially planned for San Francisco, on Crissy Field. This version of the museum would have held Lucas's art collection, which is estimated to be worth approximately $1 billion. After four years of unsuccessful negotiations with The Presidio Trust over the land in San Francisco, Lucas announced that Chicago would host the museum instead, due to interest from the city's mayor, Rahm Emanuel, and the promise of land on the shore of Lake Michigan. The museum would lease the land from the Chicago Park District for $1 a year. Los Angeles Mayor Eric Garcetti also made a bid to host the project, offering Lucas land in Exposition Park adjacent to the University of Southern California. Lucas, however, looked to Chicago as the location to build his museum. Youngstown, Ohio Mayor John McNally had also proposed to Lucas to locate the museum in his city, offering donated land in the downtown area.

Previous plan for the museum in Chicago

In Chicago, the proposed site on a parking lot near Soldier Field, Burnham Harbor, and the Museum Campus was chosen by a Chicago city commission. After the formal announcement of the museum's location on Chicago's lake shore and the later unveiling of its architecture, the project faced opposition as it had in San Francisco. In an editorial, the Chicago Tribune condemned the size of the structure, referring to it as "a monument to its patron rather than a modest addition to a democratic public space". The Chicago plan called for a museum building roughly four times the size of the one that had been planned in San Francisco, though that size was later scaled back. The Tribune also expressed worries about the cost of maintenance, to be absorbed by taxpayers, and the damage to the preservation of the lakefront.

Friends of the Parks, a Chicago-area preservation organization, opposed the plan, citing a ban on development on the land proposed for the Lucas Museum. It filed a federal suit to block the development, arguing that granting the museum a 99-year lease "effectively surrenders control" of prime lakefront property to a museum that is "not for the benefit of the public" but would "promote private and/or commercial interests". In March 2015, U.S. District Judge John Darrah ruled the land intended for the museum is held in public trust. Thus, the Illinois General Assembly is the only body with the power to amend the law and allow construction to proceed. The state subsequently approved a law designed to enable such projects, and the Chicago City Council approved zoning. while the Chicago Park District approved a long-term lease and litigation ensued.

MAD architects, headed by Ma Yansong, was responsible for designing a building for the Chicago site, while VOA Associates was designated to oversee construction. Studio Gang Architects, already involved in the rehabilitation of Northerly Island, was selected to design the landscape. The design was met with some criticism upon release. Blair Kamin of the Chicago Tribune called the structure "needlessly massive" and called for a "dose of restraint" to preserve the lakefront. In Crain's Chicago Business, Greg Hinz derided it as "[yelling] and [carrying] on, in its own way defacing the city's lakefront as much as any teenager with a can of spray paint...". Revised plans were released in September 2015, which scaled back on the size of the project but otherwise kept the basic design.

Criticism also has been leveled against Friends of the Parks for its opposition to the project; a project that would have converted a stadium parking lot to a cultural attraction along with additional parkland, and also directly and indirectly provide millions of dollars annually to the host city. In May 2016, Bill Kurtis wrote an op-ed in support of the Lucas Museum which appeared in the Chicago Tribune.

On May 3, 2016, a statement released by Mellody Hobson, wife of George Lucas, stated that the couple was seeking other cities to host the museum after a protracted confrontation with Friends of the Parks. On June 24, 2016, Lucas announced that the museum would not be located in Chicago.

=== Los Angeles site ===
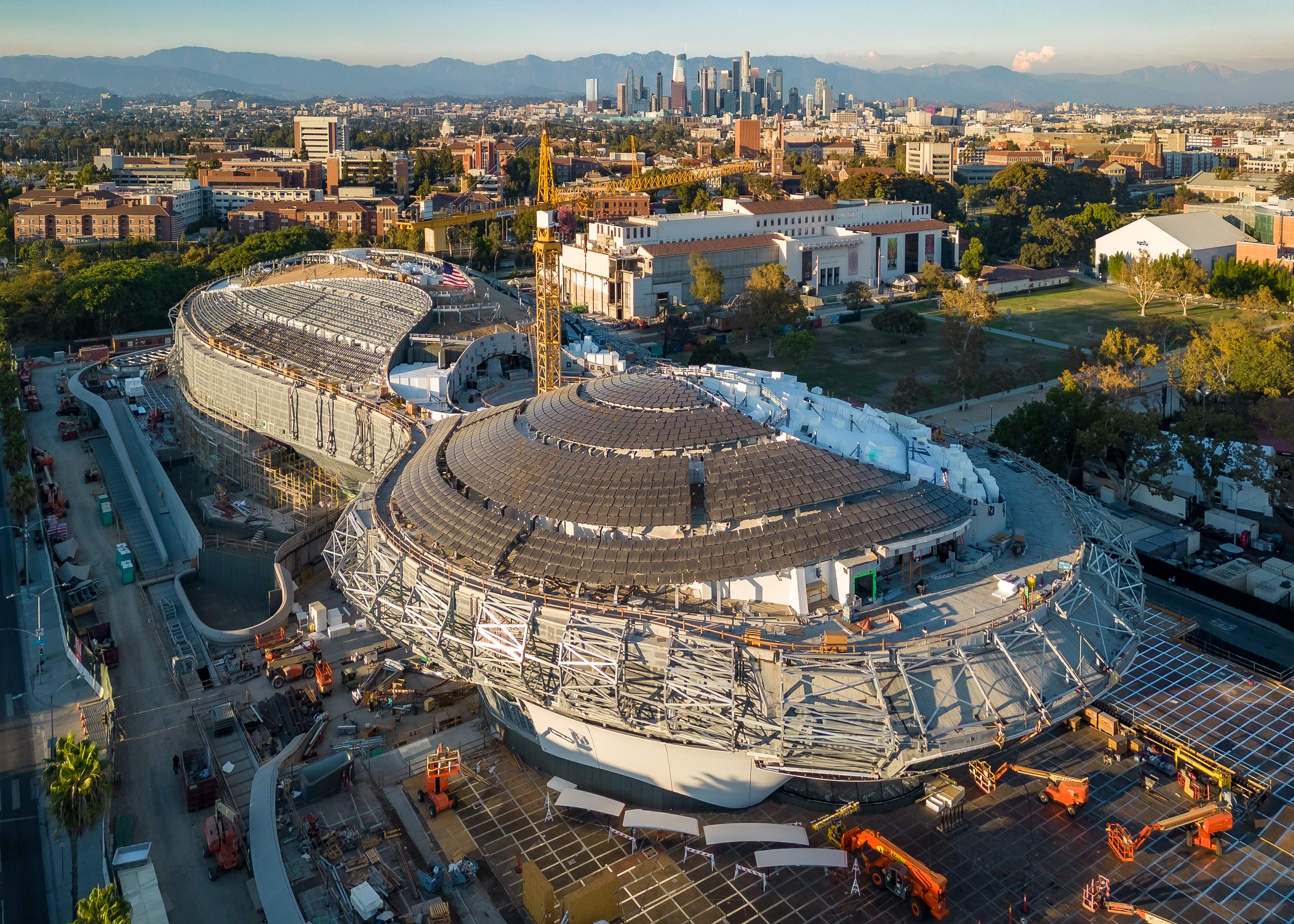
The museum under construction in 2022

After unsuccessful negotiations in San Francisco and Chicago, in June 2016 museum officials announced that they were considering Los Angeles. George Lucas announced on January 10, 2017, that the museum would be built in Exposition Park in Los Angeles, California, citing the proximity of University of Southern California, his alma mater, the Los Angeles Memorial Coliseum, BMO Stadium, other museums, and local schools in the South Los Angeles region.

The building was designed by Ma Yansong of Chinese architecture firm MAD Architects (MAD Studio) and architect of record Stantec. The museum's nearly 300,000-square-foot (28,000 m^{2}) building will be five levels and include 100,000 square feet (9,300 m^{2}) of dedicated gallery space, a library, dedicated learning studios, two theaters, a restaurant, a café, and an event space, and will sit on 11 acres of new park space designed by landscape architecture firm Studio-MLA.

==== Construction ====
Construction prep began in January 2018. Hathaway Dinwiddie is the general contractor. The groundbreaking ceremony took place on March 14, 2018. The museum was originally set to open in 2021, but the opening was pushed to 2023 due to delays associated with the COVID-19 pandemic. In 2022, the opening was pushed again, to 2025. In 2025, it was pushed back further to 2026.

== See also ==
- Narrative art
- Visual narrative
