= Harbin Grand Theatre =

Performing arts centre in Harbin, Heilongjiang Province, China

Harbin Opera House
- Interactive map of the Harbin Opera House area

General information
- Status: Completed
- Type: Performing arts centre
- Location: Cultural Island, Harbin, China
- Coordinates: 45.80710°N 126.57865°E
- Groundbreaking: April 2011
- Opened: 2015
- Inaugurated: 2015

Design and construction
- Architect: Ma Yansong
- Main contractor: Sika AG et al.

Website
- www.hrbgtheatre.com#/

The Harbin Grand Theatre or Harbin Opera House (Chinese: 哈尔滨大剧院; pinyin: Hā'ěrbīn Dàjùyuàn) is a multi-venue performing arts centre in Harbin, Heilongjiang Province, China. Measuring 850,349 square feet, the theatre is designed by well-known Chinese architect agency MAD led by Ma Yansong.

== Description ==
The theatre is situated in Harbin, a UNESCO-listed "City of Music", hosting city of the renowned annual Harbin Summer Music Concert and a metropolis where China's first ever orchestra was established. The building serves as the centerpiece of Harbin's Cultural Island—an arts hub by the Songhua River and surrounding wetlands in suburban Harbin.

The theatre is clad entirely in white aluminium panels. There is a structure inside the opera house with contemporary white walls, skylights and timber.

=== Performance venues and facilities ===
The Harbin Grand Theatre includes a number of performance venues:

- Grand theatre: Consists of 1538 seats, it is the main part of the theatre.
- Smaller theatre: The second largest part consists of 414 seats. This backwall of it is sound-proof glass, making natural scene a background for performance.
- Dressing rooms and Rehearsal Halls
- Public space: Both ticketholders and the general public alike can explore the building. There are carved paths on the façade of the building. Visitors are able to climb up to the top of the building for sightseeing. Grand lobby space are resting place for visitors and sightseers.
- Parking space: 470 parking places are offered on the ground floor outside the building.

== Design inspirations ==
Ma wanted its snow-white structure to have a soothing aesthetic, in contrast to modern landmark buildings in Chinese cities which are often towering and imposing. The architect emphasized the building's integration to nature as an extension of surrounding wetlands, waterways, and snowy terrain.

The architect "envision(s) Harbin Opera House as a cultural center of the future – a tremendous performance venue, as well as a dramatic public space that embodies the integration of human, art and the city identity".

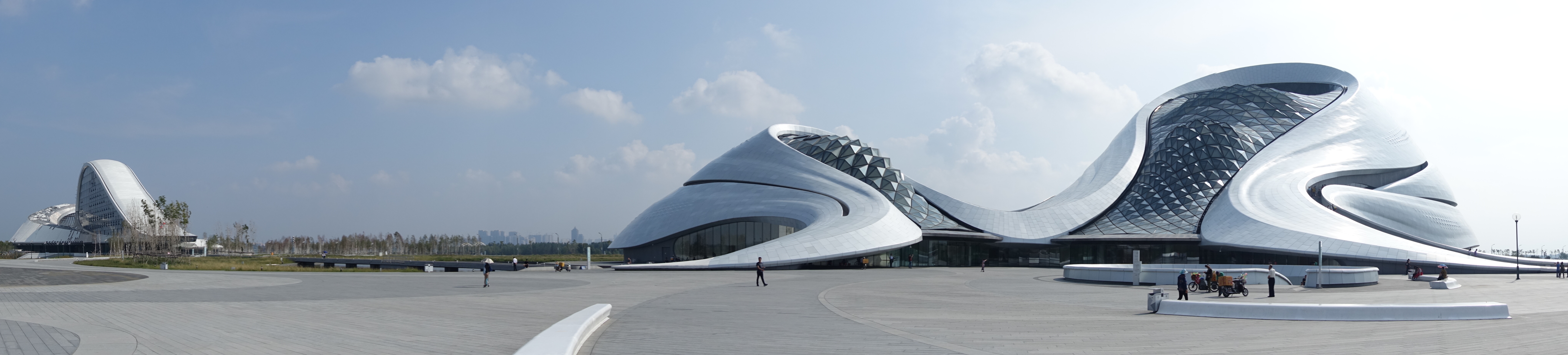
A panoramic view of Harbin Grand Theatre

== Awards ==
The Harbin Grand Theatre won the ArchDaily 2016 Building of the Year Award, WAN Performing Spaces Award 2016 and 2017 IALD Award.
