= Don Bacigalupi =

Museum administrator and curator

Don Bacigalupi is a curator specializing in contemporary art and popular culture and a museum administrator. Bacigalupi helped to set the direction for two American museums early in their history: The Crystal Bridges Museum of American Art and The Lucas Museum of Narrative Art.

== Early life and education ==
Bacigalupi was born in New York in 1960 and moved to Fort Lauderdale, Florida, when he was nine years old.

Bacigalupi studied at the University of Houston where he earned a bachelor's degree. He earned a master's degree and a Ph.D. in art history from the University of Texas, Austin.

== Career ==
Bacigalupi was the Brown Curator of Contemporary Art at the San Antonio Museum of Art from 1993 to 1995. He was director and chief curator of the Blaffer Art Museum at the University of Houston from 1995 to 1999. While at Blaffer, he curated the exhibition Michael Ray Charles, 1989–1997: An American Artist's Work.

From 1999 to 2003, Bacigalupi served as executive director of the San Diego Museum of Art. Dan Stephen, president of the museum's board, described Bacigalupi's tenure as "We wanted someone with fire in his belly, and we got someone like that—someone who could do some fence mending, someone who could help us take our place in the community of museums and as an educational resource." During Bacigalupi's tenure, exhibitions at the museum included High Societies, Axis Mexico, Idol of the Moderns: Pierre-Auguste Renoir and American Painting, and Power & Desire: South Asian Paintings from the Edwin Binney 3rd Collection.

From 2003 to 2009, Bacigalupi served as director of the Toledo Museum of Art. During his tenure, Bacigalupi acquired numerous works for the collection including The Party by Marisol Escobar, Executive by Duane Hanson, and Chandelier Campiello del Remer #2 by Dale Chihuly. He also spearheaded the development of the Glass Pavilion that opened in 2006. Georgia Welles, a committee member at the museum, said of Mr. Bacigalupi "I was always delighted with his enthusiasm when he found wonderful objects to present to us. I would say we had a very successful time under Don's tenure and everyone wishes him well with his new job."

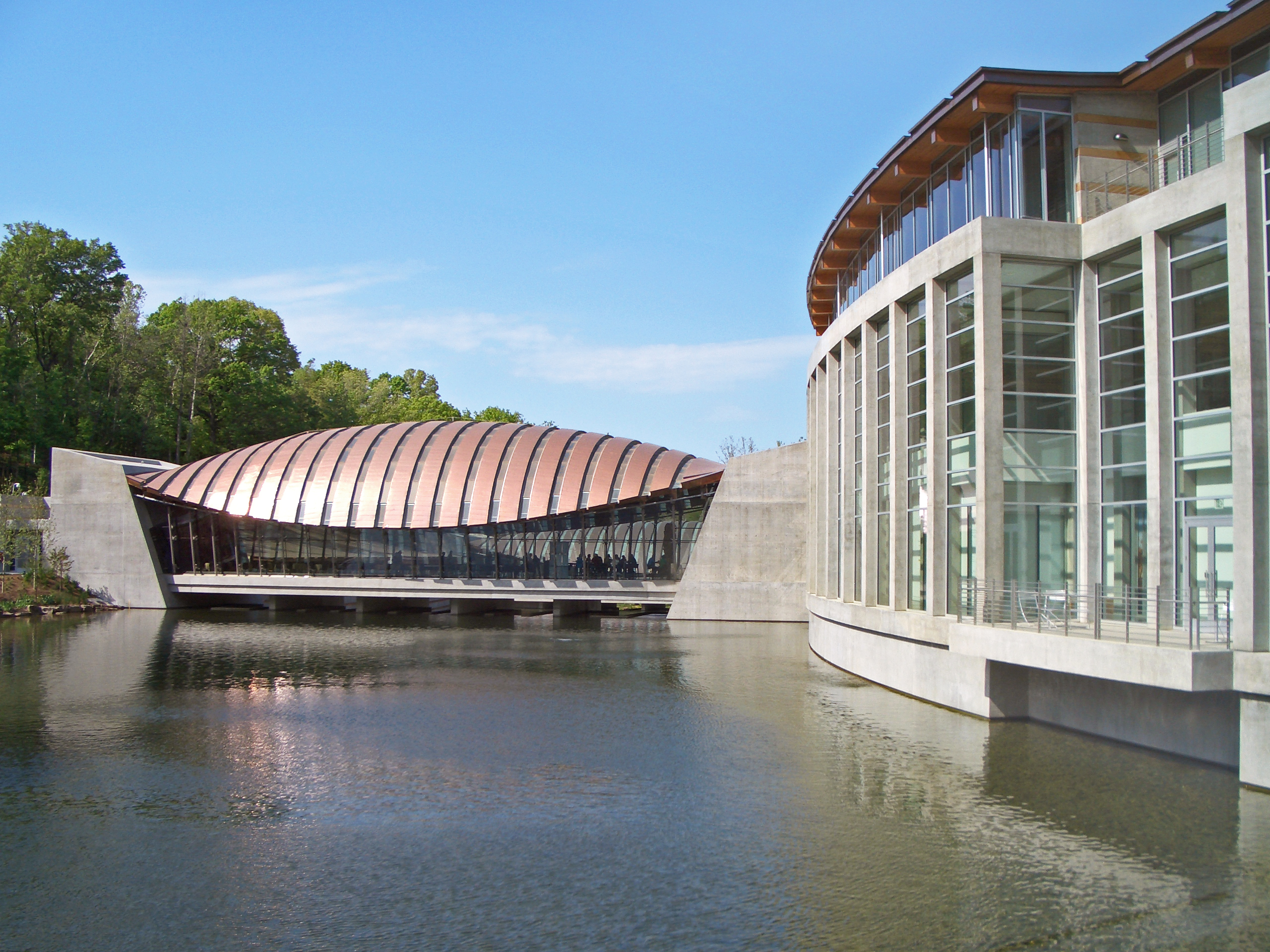
Crystal Bridges Museum of American Art

In August 2009, the Crystal Bridges Museum of American Art named Bacigalupi as director, two years prior to its opening in November 2011. John Wilmerding said of the appointment, “It’s an opportunity for it [the museum] to be perceived not as a curiosity in the hinterlands, but as a major American art museum.” At the time of his appointment, Virginia Germann, director of museum relations at Crystal Bridges, said Bacigalupi "has several skills that will enable him to oversee completion of a new, unusual building, to build a team, and interact with both the Bentonville community and his peers around the world. While at Crystal Bridges. Bacigalupi curated the exhibition State of the Art: Discovering American Art Now, which presented work by around 100 contemporary American artists. In August of 2014, Bacigalupi gave a TEDx talk describing the process of putting the exhibition together.

When Bacigalupi left Crystal Bridges, founder and board chair Alice Walton said of him "“Don’s achievements at Crystal Bridges have been numerous, and many of our successes are attributable to his guidance leading up to the opening of the museum and continuing into our highly successful next three years. He came on board when the museum was in its early stages, guiding our direction through the building phase and helping to shape the development and exhibition of our art collection."

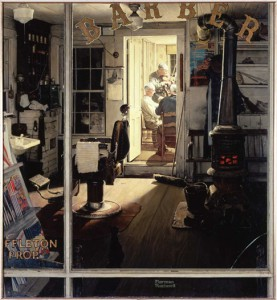
Shuffleton's Barbershop by Norman Rockwell

In November, 2014, Bacigalupi was named founding president of the Lucas Museum of Narrative Art. Worth magazine wrote "Don Bacigalupi is arguably America’s most innovative museum director, and he’s become a trusted partner to some of the nation’s wealthiest individuals when they want to create public art institutions." Worth described Bacigalupi as "a carefully-dressed academic who naturally speaks in paragraphs, [and] has become adept at working with exacting collectors and benefactors." In 2018, during Bacigalupi's tenure, the museum acquired Shuffleton’s Barbershop by Norman Rockwell. Bacigaluci said of the acquisition "This will be one of the anchor works of our museum, which we’re delighted to share with the public." In February 2019, the museum announced that Bacigalupi would step down as president, continuing in the role of special adviser. George Lucas said of Bacigalupi "Don was essential in helping to formalize our vision and in laying the important groundwork that has brought us to this point. We would not have been able to break ground in Los Angeles without him."

In December of 2023, TV producer Dick Wolf gave more than 200 works to the Metropolitan Museum in New York. The gift included works by Van Gogh, Bronzino, Botticelli, and Artemisia Gentileschi. Bacigalupi was described by The Art Newspaper as the art advisor who helped Wolf to assemble the collection.

== Personal life ==
As of July 2020, Bacigalupi lives with his husband graphic artist Dan Feder and their teenage son in the Hancock Park neighborhood of Los Angeles. They have lived in that neighborhood since their move from Chicago in 2018. Additionally, the couple have a weekend home in Palm Springs.

In September of 2024, Bacigalupi and Dan Feder were mentioned in Variety's list of sponsors of the Best In Drag Show.

== Publications ==
- Synesthesia : Sound and Vision in Contemporary Art
- Continental Discourse : Art of Mexico and the United States Today
- Transcending Limits : Moving Beyond Mainstream and Margin
- Michael Ray Charles: An American Artist's Work, 1989-1997
- Celebrating the American Spirit : Masterworks from Crystal Bridges Museum of American Art
- State of the Art: Discovering American Art Now, Exhibition Catalog, 2014.
