= Friends of the Parks =

Environmental watchdog group in Chicago, Illinois

Friends of the Parks (FOTP) is a non-profit organization in Chicago, Illinois. Formed in 1975, it acts as a watchdog group and environmental advocate for the Chicago area. Specifically, it monitors the condition and safety of the Chicago Park District and the forest preserves of Cook County.

FOTP's office is in downtown Chicago. Its staff of approximately eight people relies on volunteer efforts for many of its activities.

Annual events organized by FOTP include the Earth Day Parks and Preserves Clean-up, mobilizing several thousand volunteers on a single day in April to beautify and clean over 100 Chicago area locations; and a black tie ball which features a charity auction.

FOTP provides environmental education programs for Chicago students through two programs: Nature Along the Lake (NAL) for elementary students, and the Earth Team, an after-school apprenticeship program for high school students.

FOTP encourages grassroots efforts to organize local park organizations and acts as a liaison for organizing volunteer events to maintain and improve Chicago area parks, forest preserves, and other greenspace.

On May 3, 2016, a statement released by Melody Hobson stated that the Lucas Museum of Narrative Art would seek a location outside Chicago after a protracted confrontation with FOTP over plans that would have erected a private museum with public greenspace in place of a lakefront parking lot.

In May 2018, Juanita Irizarry, Executive Director, said that Friends of the Parks "disagree with the choice to locate [the Obama Center] on public parkland rather than vacant land across the street from Washington Park." Nonetheless, Friends of the Parks did not join the lawsuit initiated by Protect our Parks against the Obama Center.
