= MixC Shenzhen =

Shopping mall in Luohu, Shenzhen, China

Shenzhen China Resources MixC, also known as Shenzhen MixC (Chinese: 深圳万象城), is located in Luohu District，Shenzhen, China. It is connected to Shenzhen Metro Grand Theater station. It is operated by China Resources Land Ltd.'s subsidiary China Resources (Shenzhen) Co., Ltd.

MixC Shenzhen is part of Phase I of Shenzhen China Resources Center, comprising a mall with six floors and a total floor area of 167,000 square metres, and a 29-storey Grade A office tower. Phase II of Shenzhen China Resources Center includes the Grand Hyatt Shenzhen.

China Resources MixC opened in mid-December 2004, with a mall floor area of 188,000 square metres.

By turnover, Shenzhen MixC is the shopping mall with the highest revenue in Shenzhen. In 2014, its turnover reached 6.2 billion RMB, ranking fourth nationwide and second in Guangdong Province.

== Transport ==
The mall is adjacent to Shennan Road, one of Shenzhen's main arterial roads, and is served by multiple bus routes. In addition, Shenzhen Metro Line 1, and Line 2’s Grand Theater station also has exits connecting directly to the mall's B1 level.
