= Beijing University of Civil Engineering and Architecture =

Municipal public university in Beijing, China

Coordinates: 39°56′07″N 116°20′29″E

- 北京建筑大学
- Type: Public
- Established: 1936; 90 years ago
- Academic staff: 691
- Students: 10,333 (2009)
- Postgraduates: 504 (2009)
- Location: Beijing, China
- Campus: Urban 13.3 ha (33 acres)
- Website: www.bucea.edu.cn

The Beijing University of Civil Engineering and Architecture (Chinese: 北京建筑大学; pinyin: Běijīng Jiànzhù Dàxué; lit. 'Beijing Architecture University') is a municipal public university in Xicheng, Beijing, China. Established in 1936, it is affiliated with the City of Beijing and funded by the Beijing Municipal Education Committee.
