= Shenzhen Bay Cultural Plaza =

Museum in Shenzhen, China

Shenzhen Bay Culture Plaza
- 深圳湾文化广场
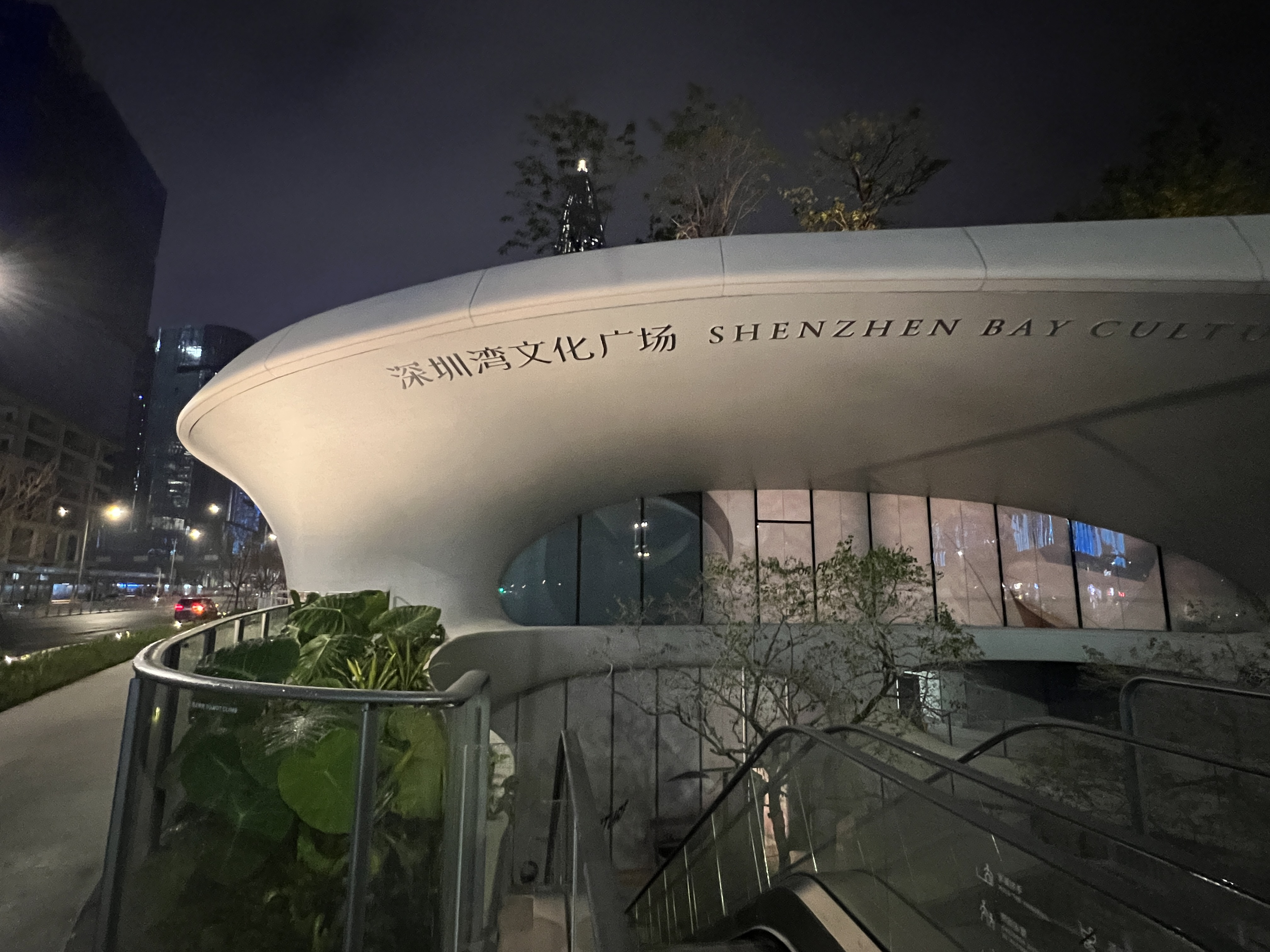
- Location: Nanshan District, Shenzhen, Guangdong Province, China, Chuangye Road (about 50 metres northwest of Shenzhen Talent Park)
- Coordinates: 22.515°N 113.940°E
- Architect: MAD Architects
- Public transit access: Adjacent to Shenzhen Talent Park, with metro and bus stations in Nanshan District nearby

Shenzhen Bay Culture Plaza (Chinese: 深圳湾文化广场) is a museum and exhibition venue located in the Houhai area of Nanshan District, Shenzhen City in China, about 50 metres northwest of Shenzhen Talent Park. The project plans to carry out design art and design science education activities and public cultural services.

The site covers a total area of about 50,900 square metres, with a total construction area of about 188,000 square metres and an exhibition area of about 50,100 square metres. The project’s schematic design is undertaken by MAD Architects led by Ma Yansong, adopting the symbolism of a Chinese allusion "Shui Luo Shi Chu" (水落石出, water receding and rocks emerging). The overall form consists of eight standalone buildings in the shape of cobblestones, and because the shape also resembles Apple’s in‑ear headphones, it has been nicknamed the “AirPods Building” by local community.

Construction of the project commenced on 26 August 2020. It entered the main structure construction phase in October 2022. On 7 April 2024, it was announced that the main structure had been fully topped out. Trial operation began in November 2025.

== International Exhibition zone ==
The International Exhibition zone collaborates on exhibitions with Tate, Design Museum in London, Musée des Arts Décoratifs, and Design Miami.

== Gallery ==
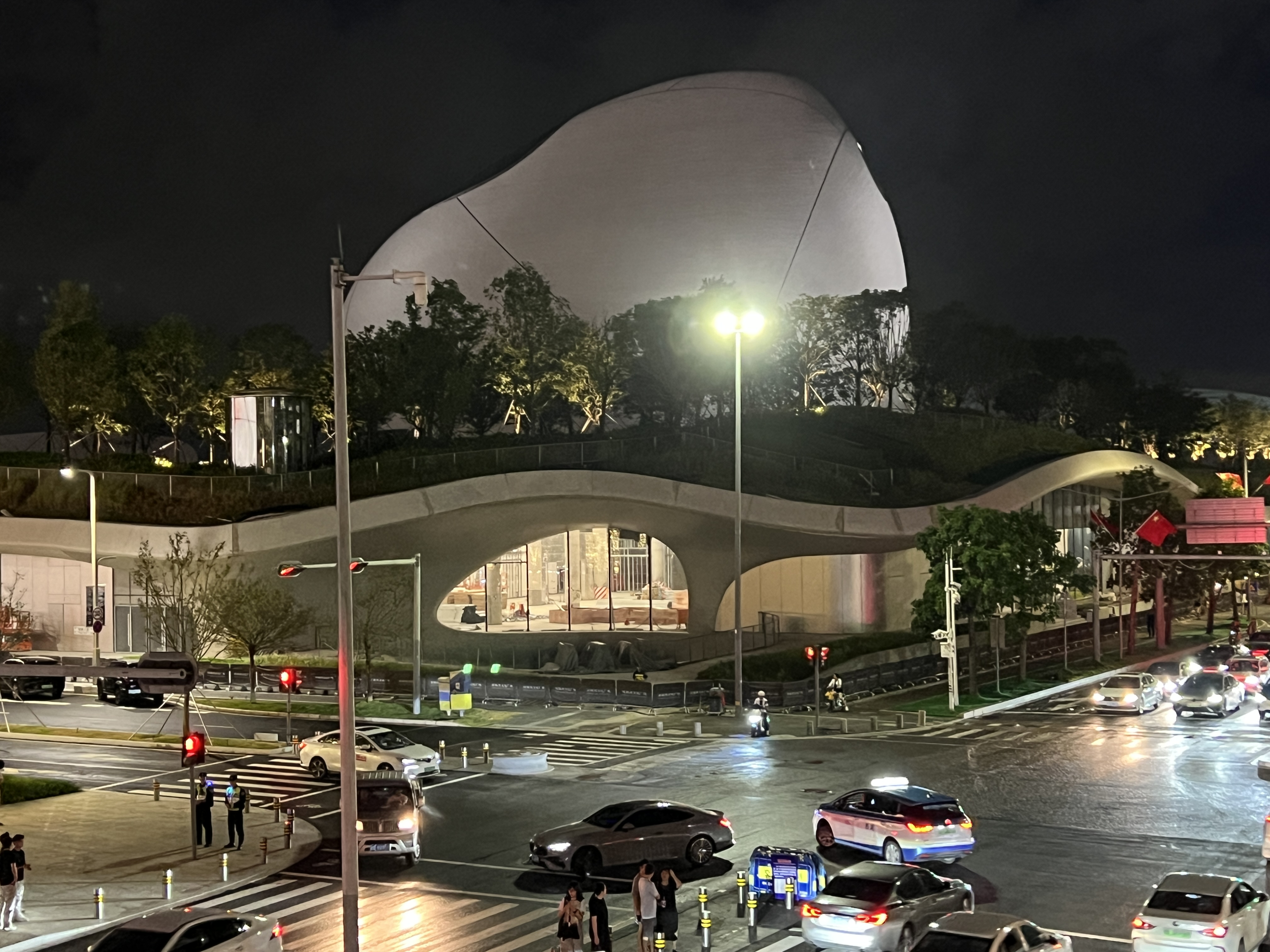

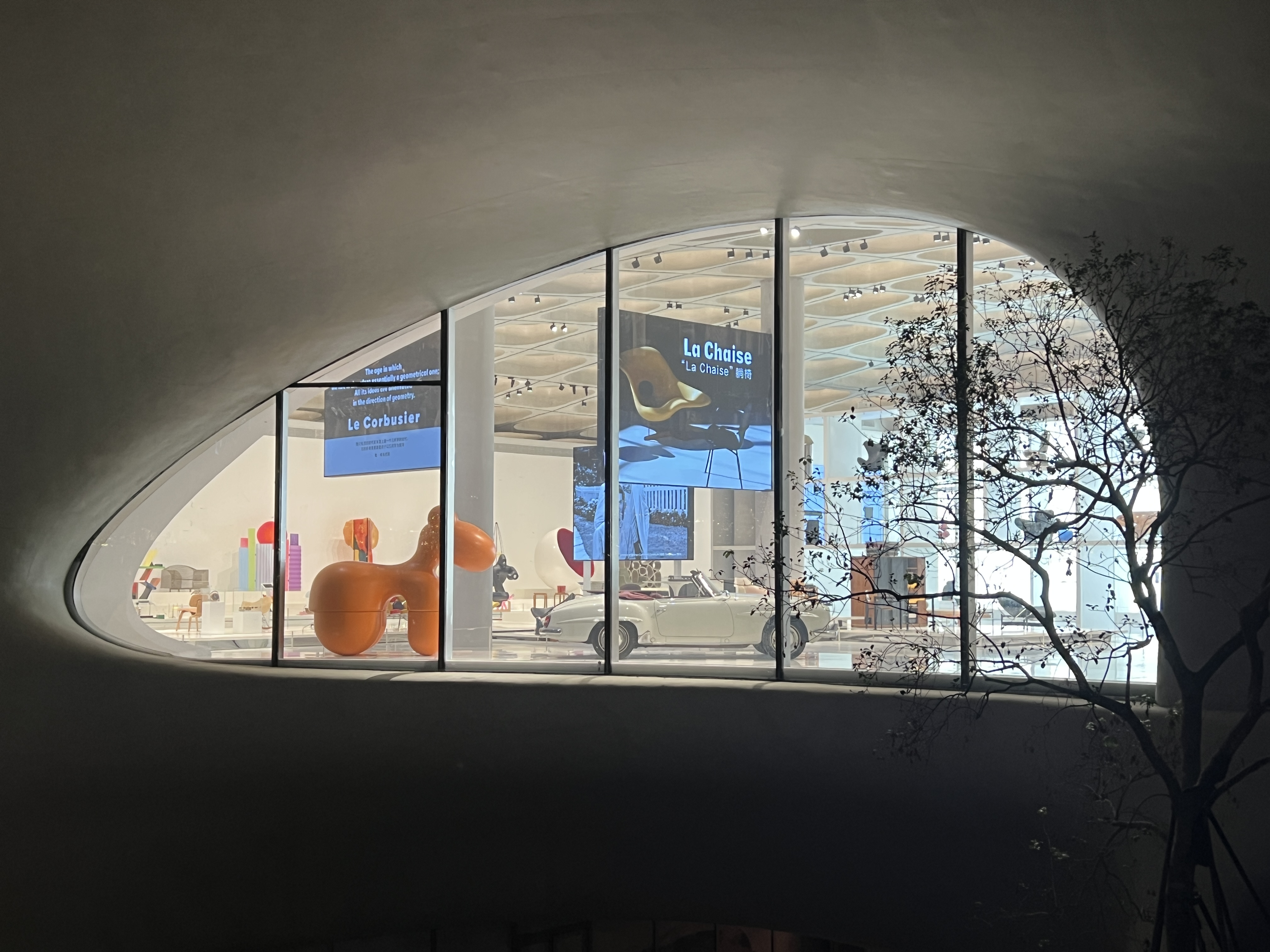

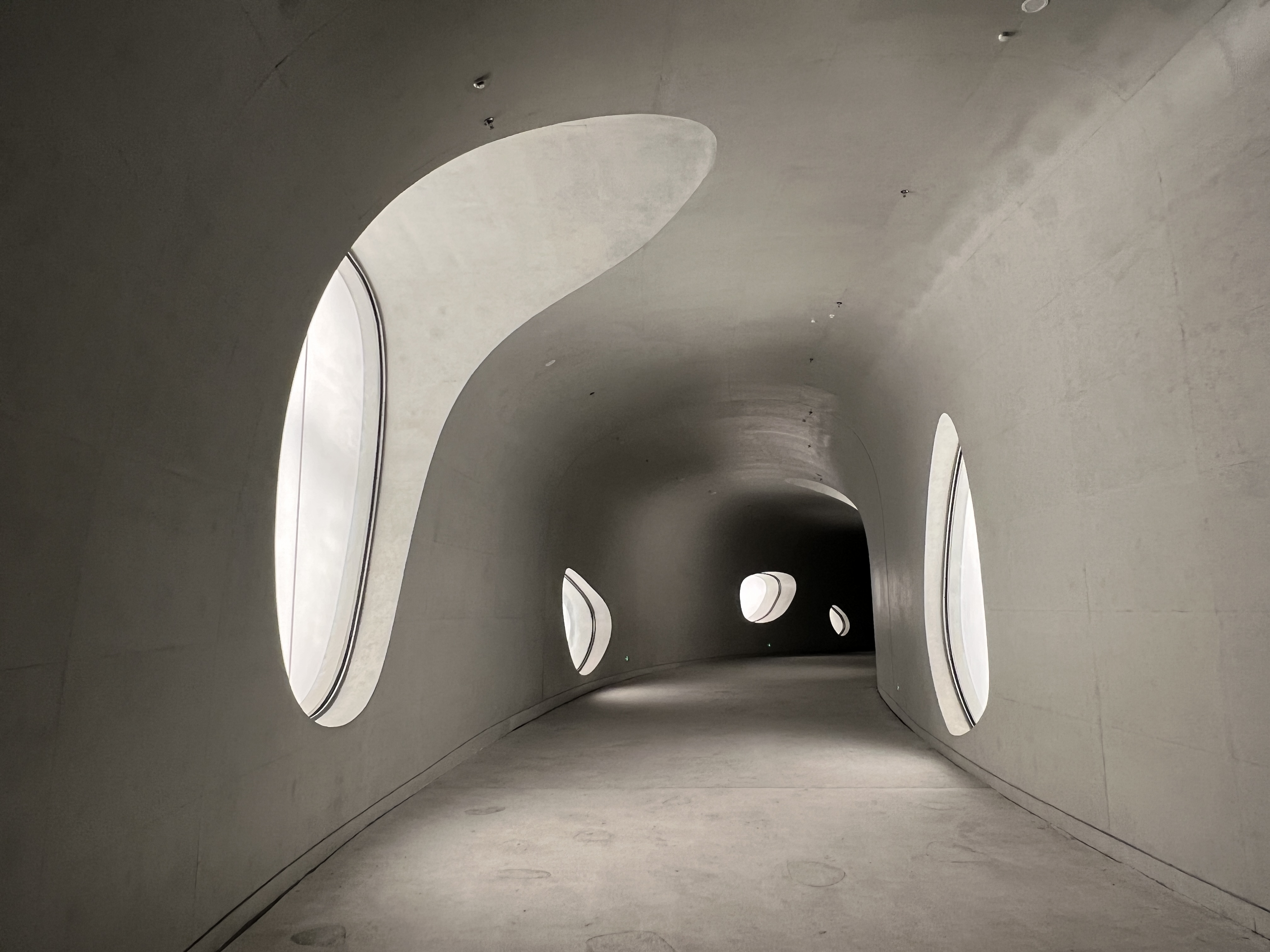

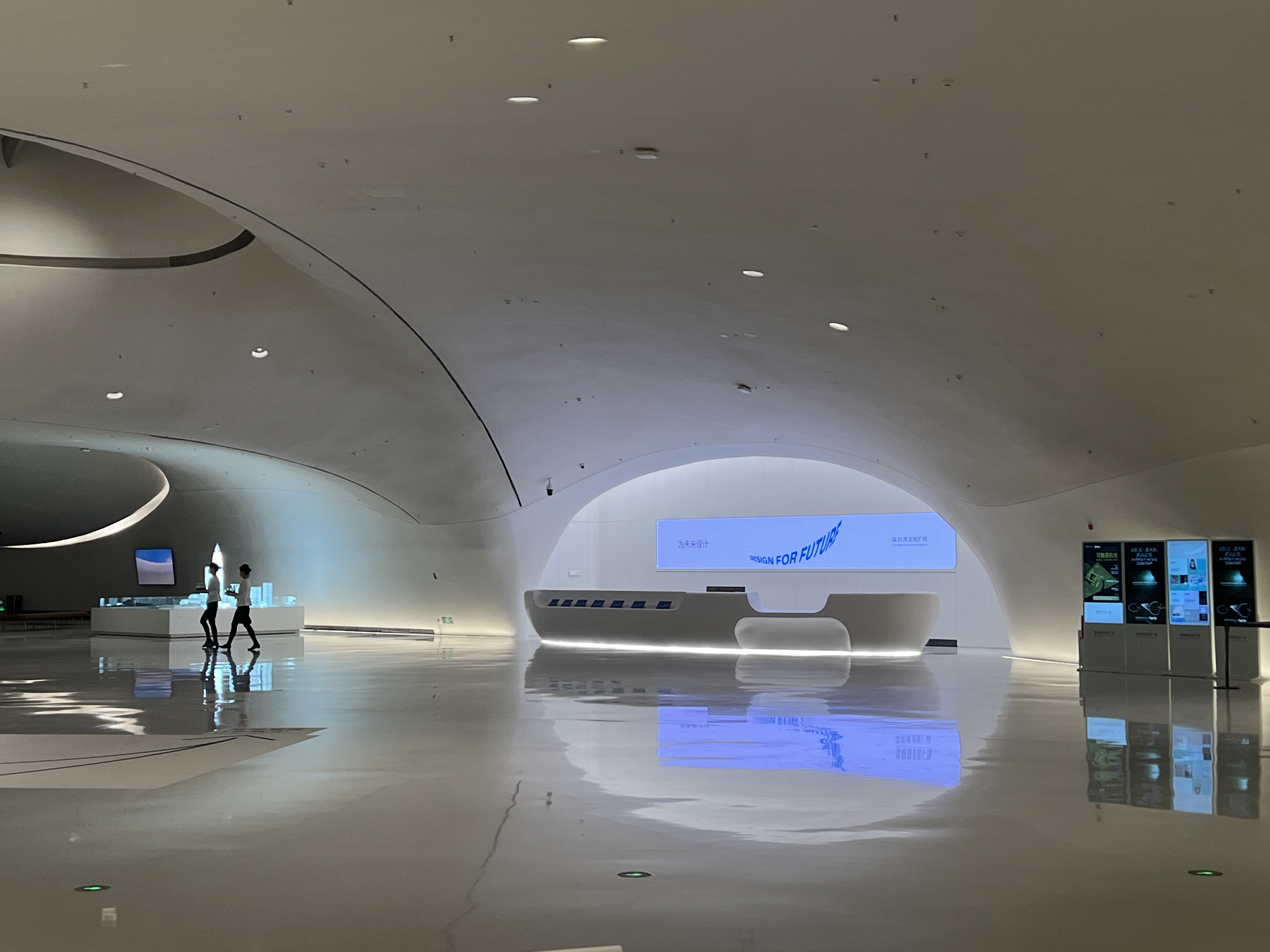

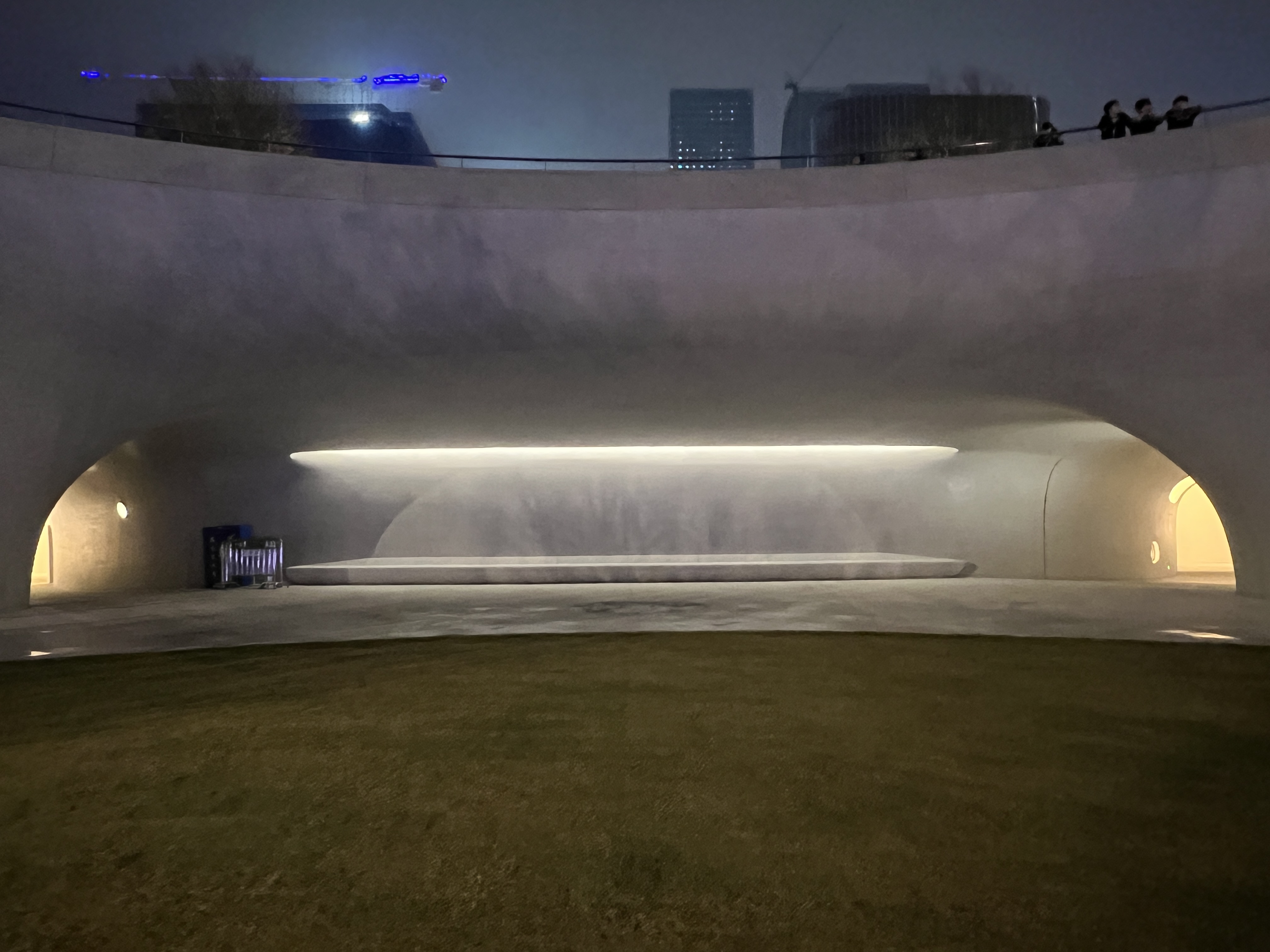

== Transport ==
- Houhai station，Shenzhen Metro
