= Ordos Museum =

Museum in Ordos, Inner Mongolia, China

Coordinates: 39.6000°N 109.7784°E

- 鄂尔多斯博物馆
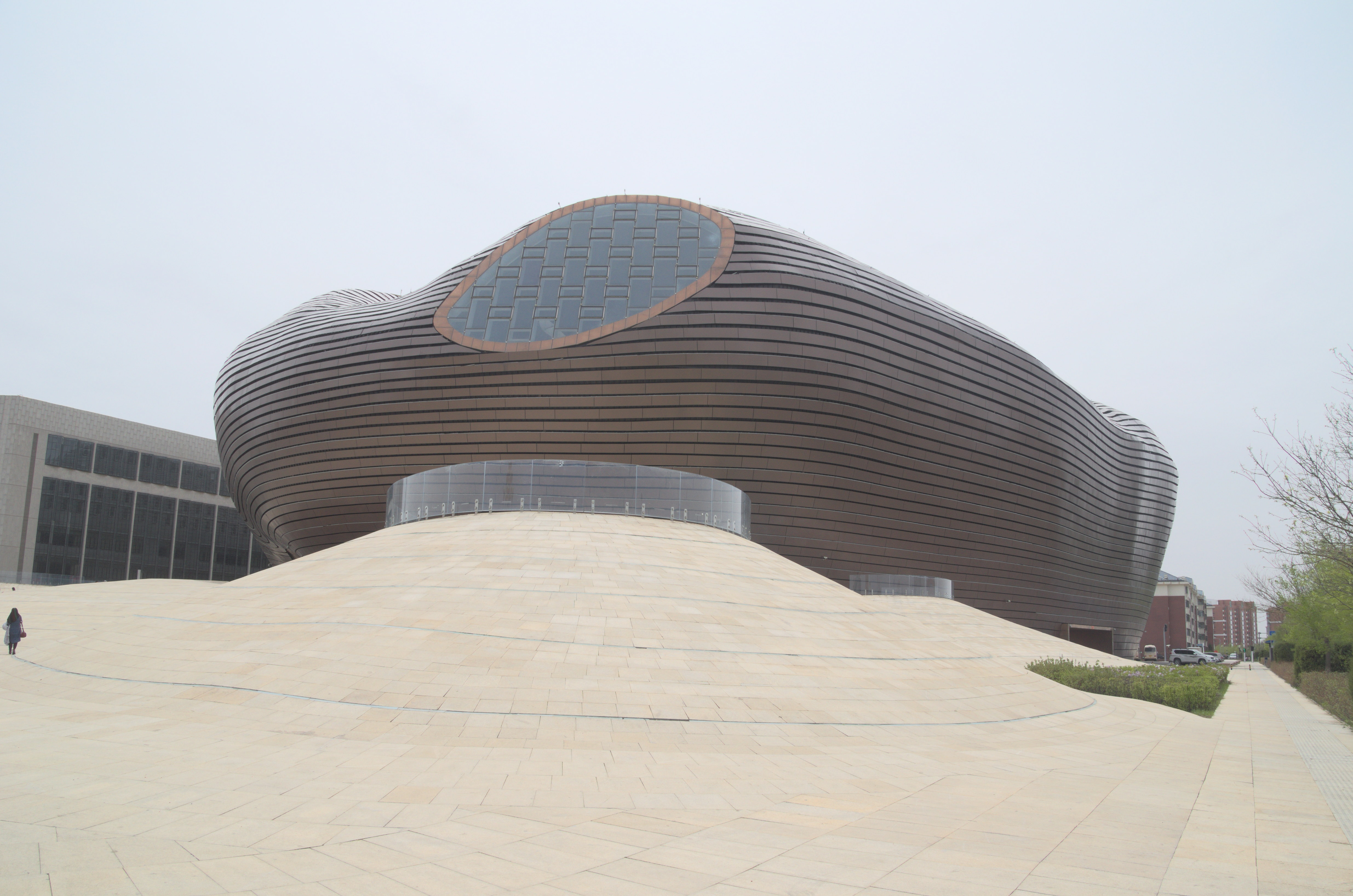
- Location: Kangbashi, Ordos, Inner Mongolia, China
- Type: Museum

The Ordos Museum (Chinese: 鄂尔多斯博物馆) is a museum in Kangbashi, Ordos, Inner Mongolia, China.

The museum, which houses collections relating to the local history of Ordos and the surrounding area, was designed by Chinese design company MAD at the request of the local government and built by Huhehaote Construction. It is a large, open-plan space of around 41,000 square feet; the design was influenced by both the Gobi Desert and the work of Buckminster Fuller. The museum has six levels of exhibition space.

== See also ==
- List of museums in China
