= 3D printing processes =

Methods used for additive 3D manufacturing

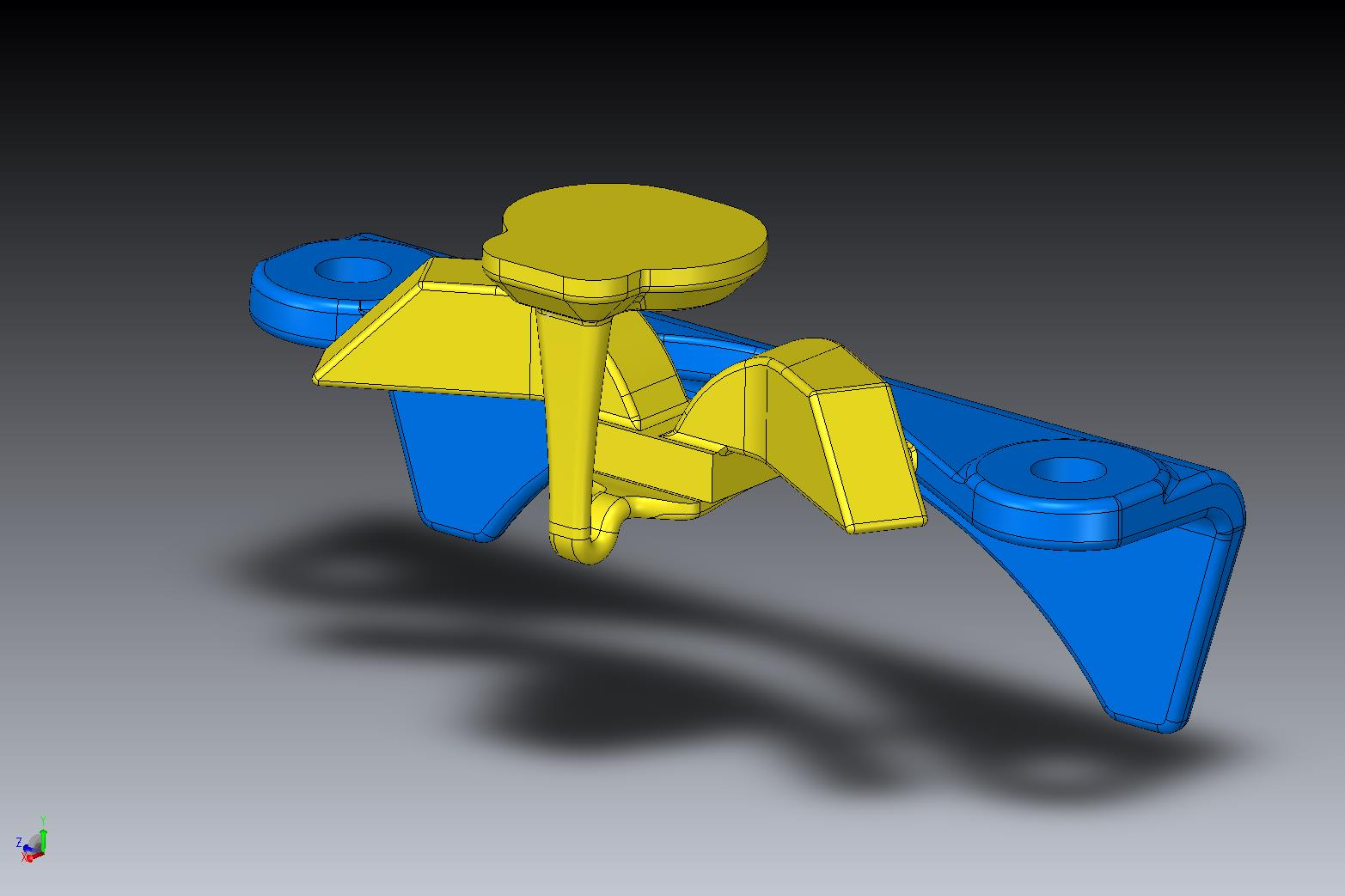
Computer-aided design (CAD) model used for 3D printing. The manual modeling process of preparing geometric data for 3D computer graphics is similar to plastic arts such as sculpting. 3D scanning is a process of collecting digital data on the shape and appearance of a real object, creating a digital model based on it.

A variety of processes, equipment, and materials are used in the production of a three-dimensional object via additive manufacturing.

Techniques include jetting, extrusion, additive friction stir deposition, powder bed fusion, binder jetting, stereolithography, computed axial lithography, liquid alternative, lamination, directed energy deposition, selective powder deposition, and cryogenic manufacturing.

== Types ==
3D printing processes, are grouped into seven categories by ASTM International in the ISO/ASTM52900-15:

- Binder jetting
- Directed energy deposition
- Material extrusion
- Material jetting
- Powder bed fusion
- Sheet lamination
- Vat photopolymerization

Each process and piece of equipment has advantages and disadvantages associated with it. These usually involve aspects such as speed, costs, versatility with respect to feedstock, geometrical limitations and tolerances, as well as a mechanical and appearance properties of the products such as strength, texture, and color.

The variety of processes and equipment allows for numerous uses by amateurs and professionals alike. Some lend themselves better toward industry use (in this case the term additive manufacturing is preferred) whereas others make 3D printing accessible to the average consumer. Some printers are large enough to fabricate buildings whilst others tend to micro and nanoscale sized objects and in general many different technologies can be exploited to physically produce the designed objects.

== History ==
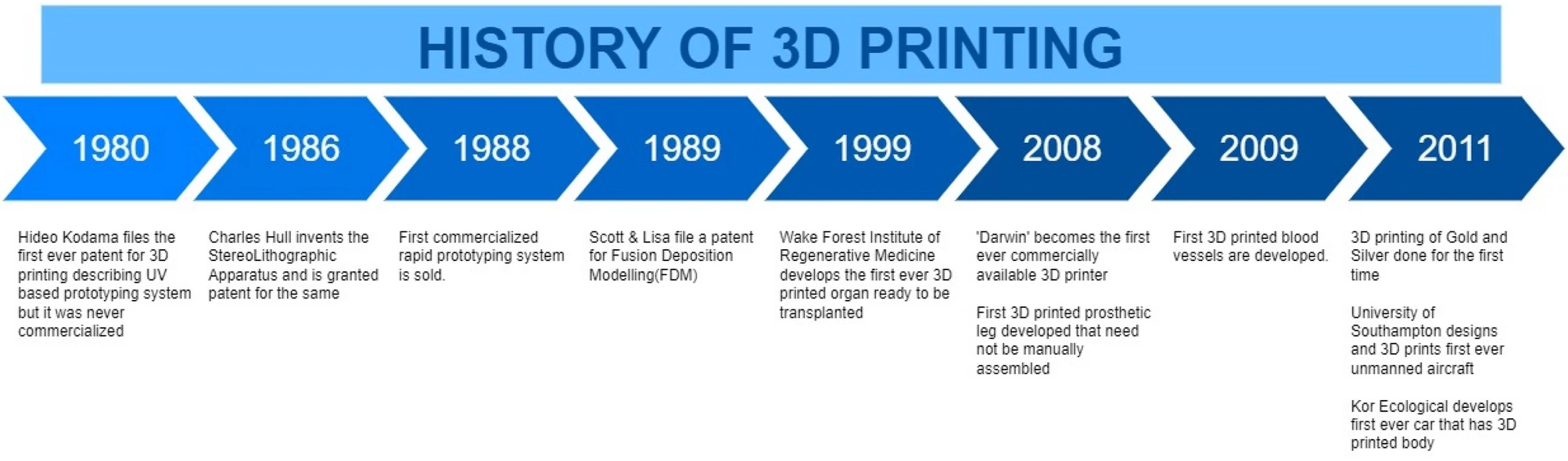
Evolution of 3D printing over the decades.

Inkjet printing was pioneered by Teletype which introduced the electrostatic pull Inktronic teleprinter in 1966. The printer had 40 jets that offered a break-through speed of 120 characters per second.

Continuous inkjets were popular in the 1950–1960's before Drop-On-Demand inkjets were invented in 1972. Continuous three-dimensional inks were wax based and low temperature metal alloys. Printing with these hot-melt inks produced alpha-numeric characters that were solid and raised, but no one recognized them as 3D printing. In 1971, a young engineer, Johannes Gottwald patented a liquid metal recorder that printed large characters in metal for signage, but Teletype Corp ignored the discovery. Braille was printed with wax inks but never commercialized in the 1960s.

R.H. Research researched printing from 1982 -1983 and decided that single-nozzle inkjet was a possible fit. He recruited engineers Al Hock, Tom Peer, Dave Lutz, Jim and Kathy McMahon to join the company, which became Howtek, Inc. The company's Pixelmaster device used Tefzel nozzles, which allowed the inkjet to work at high temperature and support thermoplastic hot-melt inks. The device could handle a frequency range of 1–16,000 drops per second. It featured 32 inkjet single nozzles per printhead, printing 4 colors (8 jets per color) CMYK. The printhead rotated at 121 rpm and placed uniform drops precisely as subtractive printing. This technology of hot-melt inks printing layers of CMYK was a precursor to a 3D patent by Richard Helinski.

Chuck Hull patented stereolithography (SLA) in 1986.

In 1993, Helinski's patent was licensed first by Sanders Prototype, Inc.,(later Solidscape, Inc) manufacturer of the first desktop rapid prototype printer, the Modelmaker 6 Pro. It used Howtek style inkjets and thermoplastic inks. Models printed with thermoplastic were perfect for investment casting with no ash during burnout. Thermoplastic ink drop printing is accurate and precise enough for jewelers and detail sensitive CAD designers. The Howtek inkjets that were designed to print a page in 4 minutes were employed to print for as long as 4 days straight.

== Processes ==
Several 3D printing processes have been invented since the late 1970s. The printers were originally large, expensive, and highly limited in what they could produce.

A large number of additive processes are now available. The main differences between processes are in the way layers are deposited to create parts and in the materials that are used. Some methods melt or soften the material to produce the layers, for example. selective laser melting (SLM) or direct metal laser sintering (DMLS), selective laser sintering (SLS), fused deposition modeling (FDM), (Note: FDM (Fused Deposition Modeling) is a trademark owned by Stratasys. Non-Stratasys machines using the same process are commonly referred to as using fused filament fabrication (FFF).) or fused filament fabrication (FFF), while others cure liquid materials using different sophisticated technologies, such as stereolithography (SLA). With laminated object manufacturing (LOM), thin layers are cut to shape and joined (e.g., paper, polymer, metal). Particle deposition using inkjet technology prints layers of material in the form of individual drops. Each drop of solid ink from hot-melt material actually prints one particle or one object. Color hot-melt inks print individual drops of CMYK on top of each other to produce a single color object with 1–3 layers melted together. Complex 3D models are printed with many overlapping drops fused together into layers as defined by the sliced CAD file. Inkjet technology allows 3D models to be solid or open cell structures as defined by the 3D printer inkjet print configuration. Each method has its own advantages and drawbacks, which is why some companies offer a choice of powder and polymer for the material used to build the object. Others sometimes use standard, off-the-shelf business paper as the build material to produce a durable prototype. The main considerations in choosing a machine are generally speed, costs of the 3D printer, of the printed prototype, choice and cost of the materials, and color capabilities.

Printers that work directly with metals are generally expensive. However less expensive printers can be used to make a mold, which is then used to make metal parts.

3D Printing Processes
Type	Technologies	Materials
Material jetting	Drop-on-demand or continuous (single- or multi-nozzle) particle deposition	Hot-melt materials (wax, thermoplastic, metal alloy), dispersed materials (technical ceramics, metals, polymers)
Material extrusion	Fused deposition modeling (FDM) or fused filament fabrication (FFF) and fused pellet fabrication or fused particle fabrication	Thermoplastics, eutectic metals, edible materials, rubbers, modeling clay, plasticine
Material extrusion	Robocasting or MIG welding 3D printing or direct ink writing (DIW) or extrusion based additive manufacturing of metals (EAM) and ceramics (EAC)	Metal-binder mixtures such as metal clay, ceramic-binder mixtures (including ceramic clay and ceramic slurries), cermet, metal matrix composite, ceramic matrix composite, metal (MIG welding)
Material extrusion	Additive friction stir deposition (AFSD)	Metal alloys
Material extrusion	Composite filament fabrication (CFF)	Nylon or nylon reinforced with carbon, Kevlar or glass fibers
Light polymerized	Stereolithography (SLA)	Photopolymer (including preceramic polymers)
Light polymerized	Digital light processing (DLP)	Photopolymer
Light polymerized	Continuous liquid interface production (CLIP)	Photopolymer + thermally activated chemistry
Light polymerized	Dynamic Interface Printing (DIP)	Photopolymer
Powder bed	Powder bed and inkjet head 3D printing (3DP)	Almost any metal alloy, powdered polymers, Plaster
Powder bed	Electron-beam melting (EBM)	Almost any metal alloy including titanium alloys
Powder bed	Selective laser melting (SLM)	Titanium alloys, cobalt-chrome alloys, stainless steel, aluminium
Powder bed	Selective heat sintering (SHS)	Thermoplastic powder
Powder bed	Selective laser sintering (SLS)	Thermoplastics, metal powders, ceramic powders
Powder bed	Direct metal laser sintering (DMLS)	Metal alloys
Laminated	Laminated object manufacturing (LOM)	Paper, metal foil, plastic film
Powder fed	Laser metal deposition (LMD) or Directed Energy Deposition (DED)	Metal alloys
Powder fed	Extreme high-speed laser cladding (EHLA)	Metal alloys
Wire	Electron beam freeform fabrication (EBF^{3})	Metal alloys
Wire	Wire-arc additive manufacturing (WAAM)	Metal alloys

=== Jetting ===
==== Material jetting ====
In material jetting a nozzle is drawn across an absorbent surface. The material is either wicked, electrostatically pulled from a larger jet, pressurized to expel material either continuously, or in short bursts as spray or drops.

Nozzles can be single nozzle with one fluid chamber or multi-nozzle with single or multi-fluid chambers, or combinations of these.

The material needs to have low enough viscosity to pass through the nozzle opening. Hot-melt materials can be melted to become liquid. The inks must be thick enough to accumulate vertically.

Continuous inkjet technology (CIT) began by printing signs and documents on paper, later adapted to print metals. Wax and thermoplastics were the first 3D materials, printed by drop-on-demand (DOD) inkjets.

==== Binder jetting ====
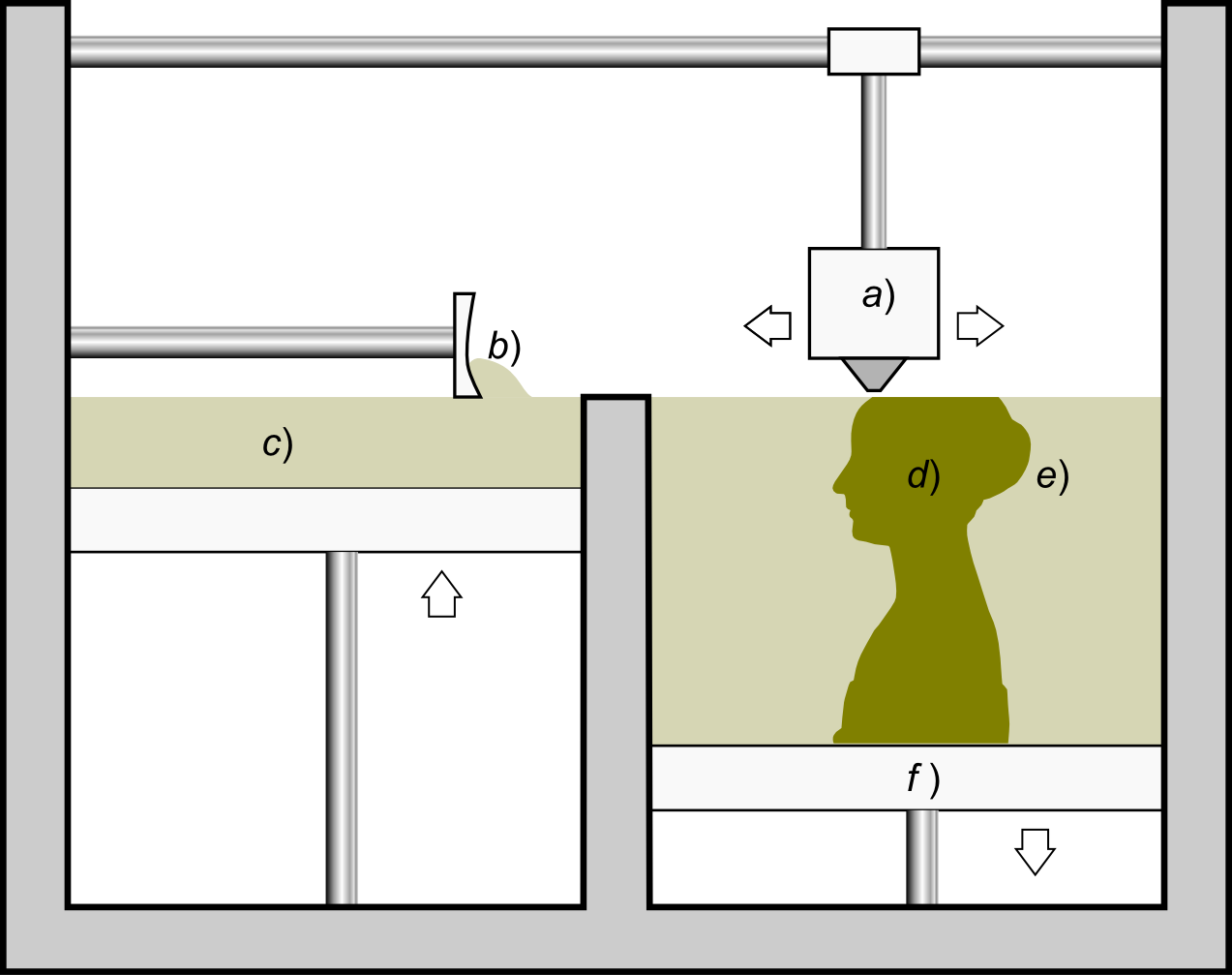
Schematic of binder jetting. Moving head selectively deposits binder onto powder bed. Platform lowers progressively. Solidified object rests in unbound powder. New powder adds from reservoir via leveling mechanism.

Binder jetting deposits binding adhesive onto layers of powdered material. Also known as inkjet 3D printing, the process spreads powder (ceramic, metal, or plastic-based, including plaster and resins) across a platform. A print head deposits binder in the cross-section of each layer. Modern printers cure (solidify) the binder at each layer. The resulting part is further cured in an oven to remove most binder. Operators sinter it in a kiln following a material-specific time-temperature curve. Unbound powder supports overhangs during printing. The method enables full-color prototypes and elastomer parts. Strength improves by impregnating voids with wax, thermoset polymer, bronze, or other compatible materials.

=== Extrusion ===
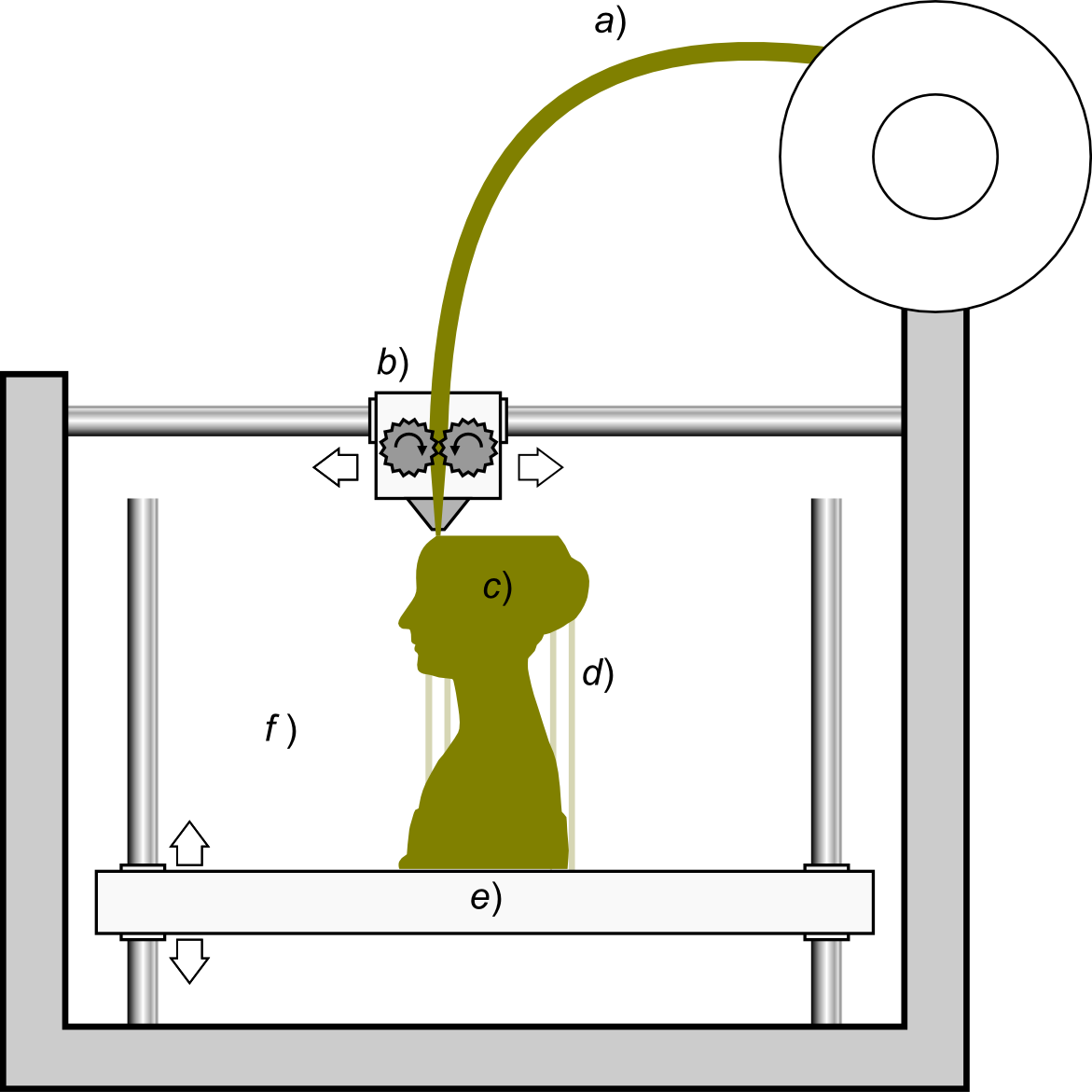
Schematic of fused filament fabrication. Filament a) feeds through heated moving head b). Head melts and extrudes material, depositing it layer by layer to form shape c). Moving platform e) lowers after each layer. Support structures d) sustain overhangs.

Fused filament fabrication (FFF), trademarked as fused deposition modeling (FDM), extrudes thermoplastic material to build objects layer by layer. As of 2023, FDM was the dominant 3D printing method.

A filament of thermoplastic feeds into an extrusion nozzle. The nozzle head heats the material to its melting point and extrudes it onto a build platform. Stepper or servomotors move the head and control flow along three axes. Computer-aided manufacturing software generates G-code. A microcontroller drives the motors.

Common materials include acrylonitrile butadiene styrene (ABS), polycarbonate (PC), polylactic acid (PLA), high-density polyethylene (HDPE), PC/ABS, polyphenylsulfone (PPSU), and high impact polystyrene (HIPS). The filament forms from virgin resins.

A timelapse video of a robot model (logo of Make magazine) being printed using FDM on a RepRapPro Fisher printer.

3D glass printer, depositing molten glass

Open-source projects recycle post-consumer plastic waste into filament using shredders and extruders like recyclebots. PTFE tubing transfers filament due to high-temperature resistance. Variants use pellets or particles instead of filament, known as fused pellet/particle/granular fabrication (FPF/FGF), aiding the use of recycled materials. Metal wire enables printing via wire arc additive manufacturing (WAAM), reducing costs. Molten glass deposition creates artistic works. Use of FDM limits complex geometries such as overhangs or stalactite structures. Slicer software adds removable support structures for such features.

S. Scott Crump developed the process in the late 1980s. Stratasys commercialized it in 1992. It evolved from automated polymeric foil hot air welding, hot-melt gluing, and gasket deposition. After patent expiration, open-source RepRap projects fostered community development and DIY variants. Prices fell by two orders of magnitude.

=== Additive friction-stir deposition ===
Additive friction stir deposition (AFSD) is a solid-state metal additive manufacturing process that uses a rotating tool to deposit feedstock material onto a substrate. AFSD offers a number of advantages over other metal additive manufacturing processes, including high material utilization, low energy consumption, and the ability to print metal alloys incompatible with melt-based processes.

=== Powder bed fusion ===
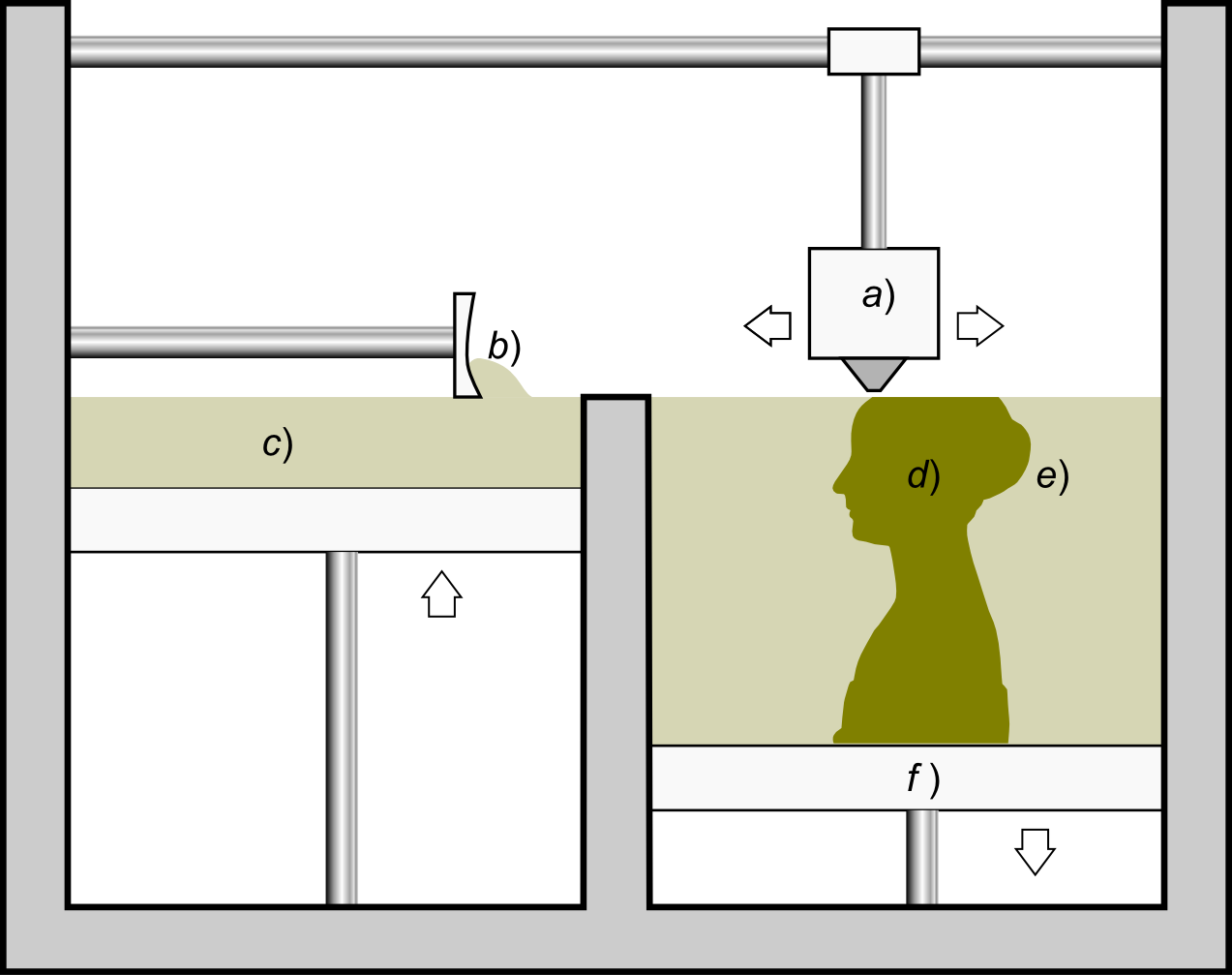
Schematic of granular binding. Moving head a) selectively binds powder bed e) surface by dropping glue or laser sintering. Platform f) lowers progressively. Solidified object d) rests in unbound powder. Leveling mechanism b) adds new powder from reservoir c).

Powder bed fusion (PBF) selectively fuses material in a granular bed. The process fuses layer parts, raises the working area, adds granules, and repeats until completion. Unfused powder supports overhangs and thin walls, reducing auxiliary supports. PBF includes direct metal laser sintering (DMLS), selective laser sintering (SLS), selective laser melting (SLM), multi-jet fusion (MJF), and electron beam melting (EBM). These methods handle diverse materials and enable complex geometries.

==== Selective laser sintering ====
Selective laser sintering (SLS) uses polymers and metals (e.g., PA, PA-GF, PEEK, alumide, carbonmide, elastomers) and direct metal laser sintering (DMLS). Deckard and Joseph Beaman developed and patented it in the mid-1980s under DARPA sponsorship. R. F. Housholder patented a similar, uncommercialized process in 1979.

==== Selective laser melting ====
Selective laser melting (SLM) does not use sintering for the fusion of powder granules but melts the powder using a high-energy laser to create fully dense materials in a layer-wise method that has mechanical properties similar to those of conventional manufactured metals.

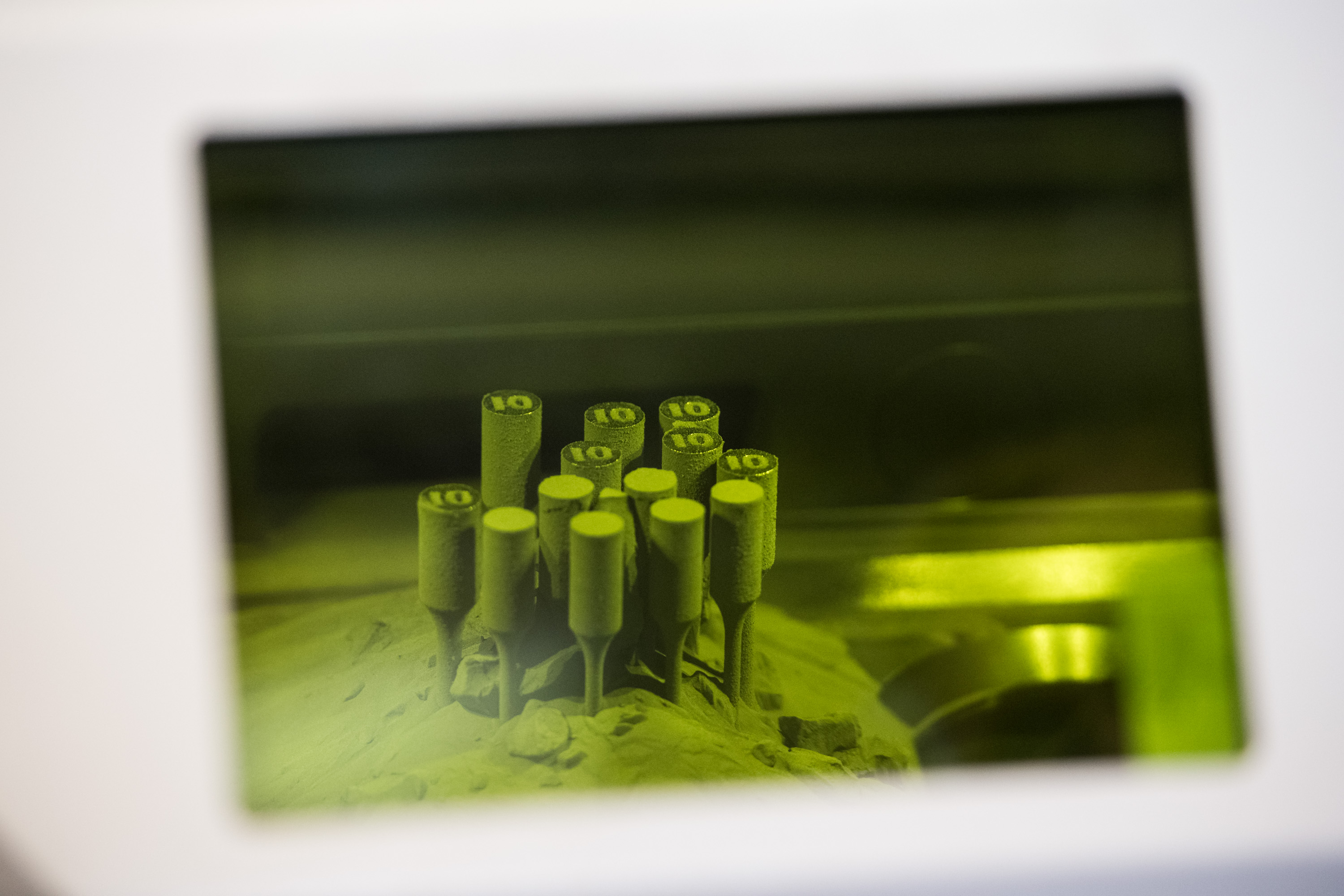
Selective laser melting in TRUMPF TruPrint 1000 - view of the printing chamber with print in progress.

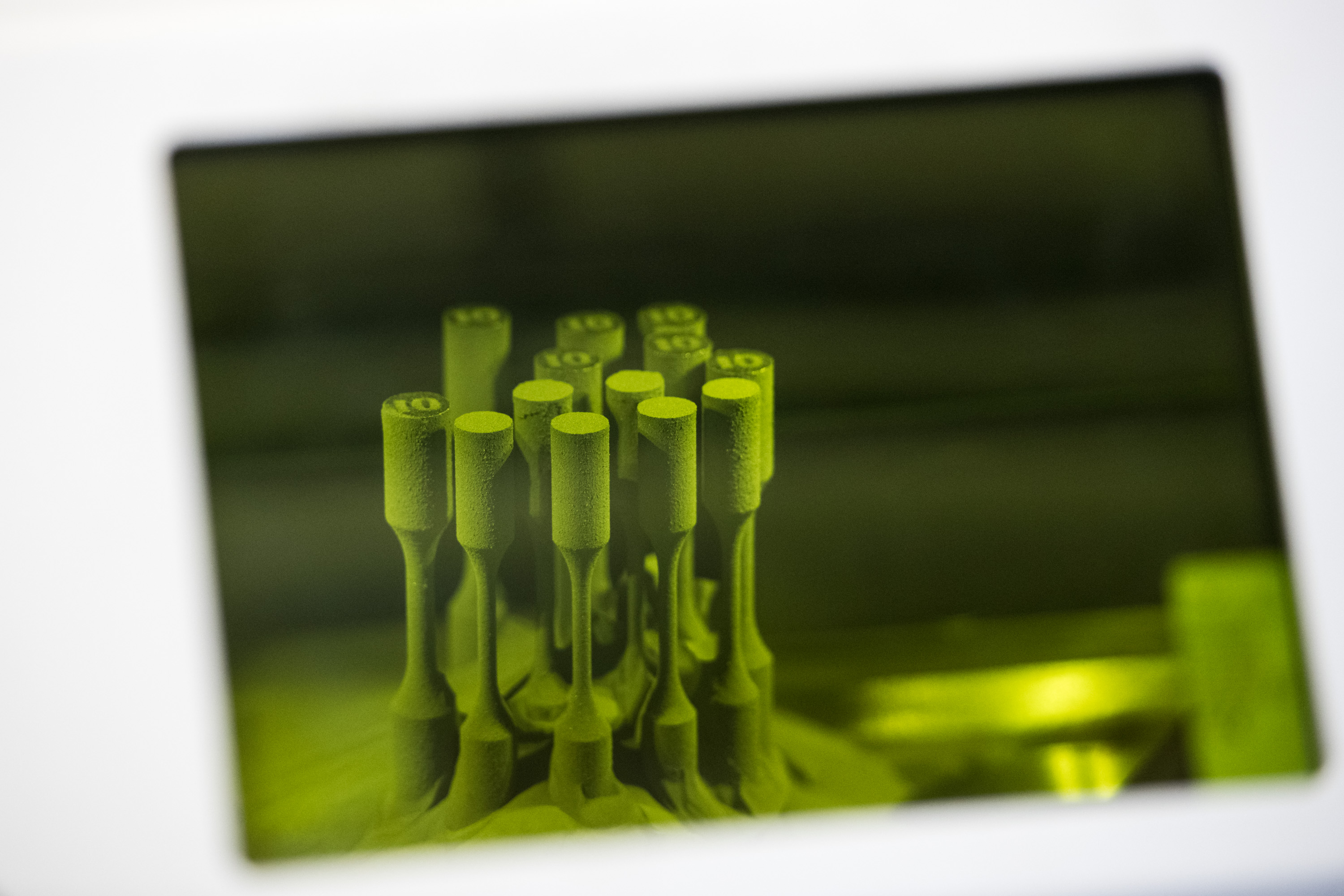
Print in progress

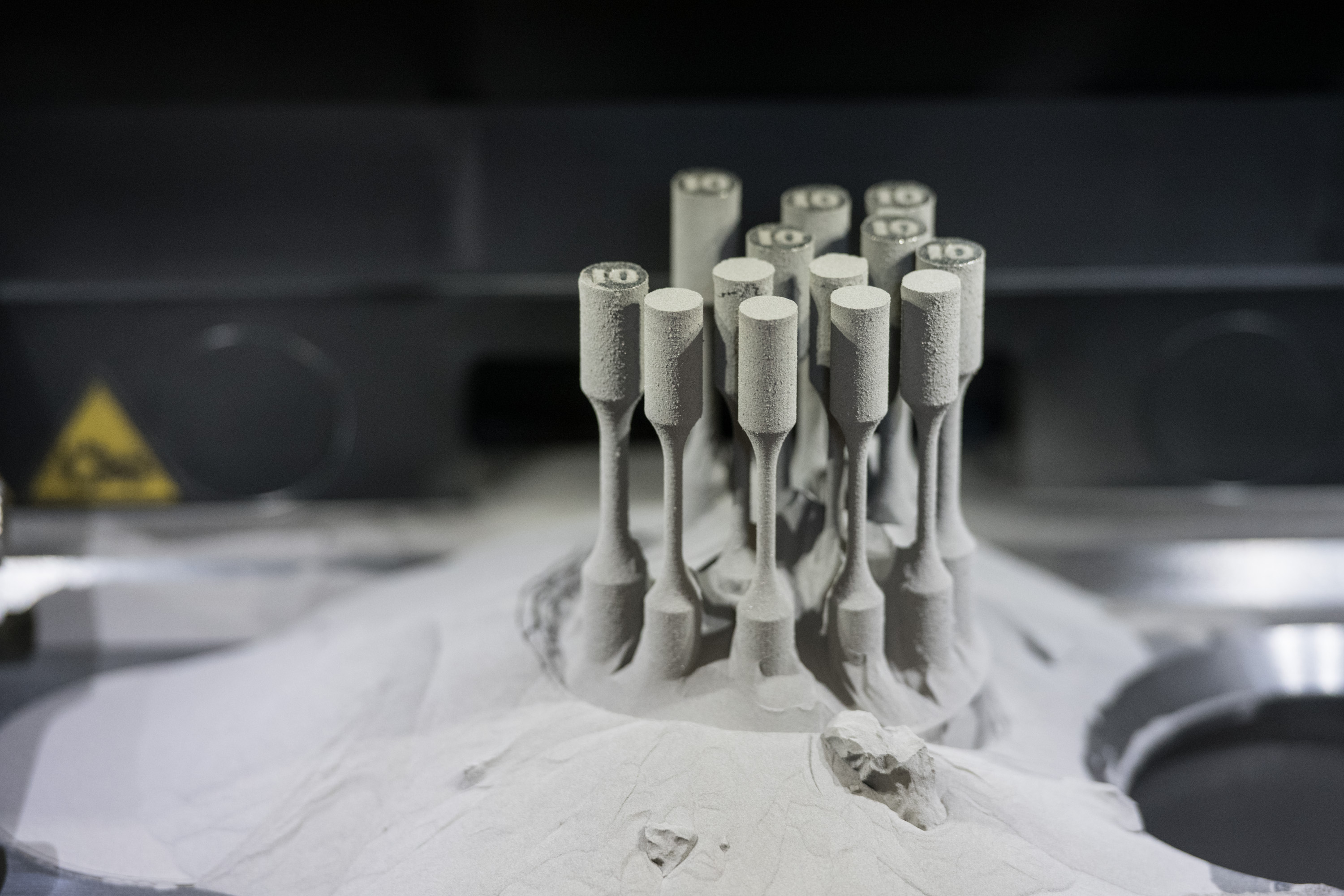
Print finished

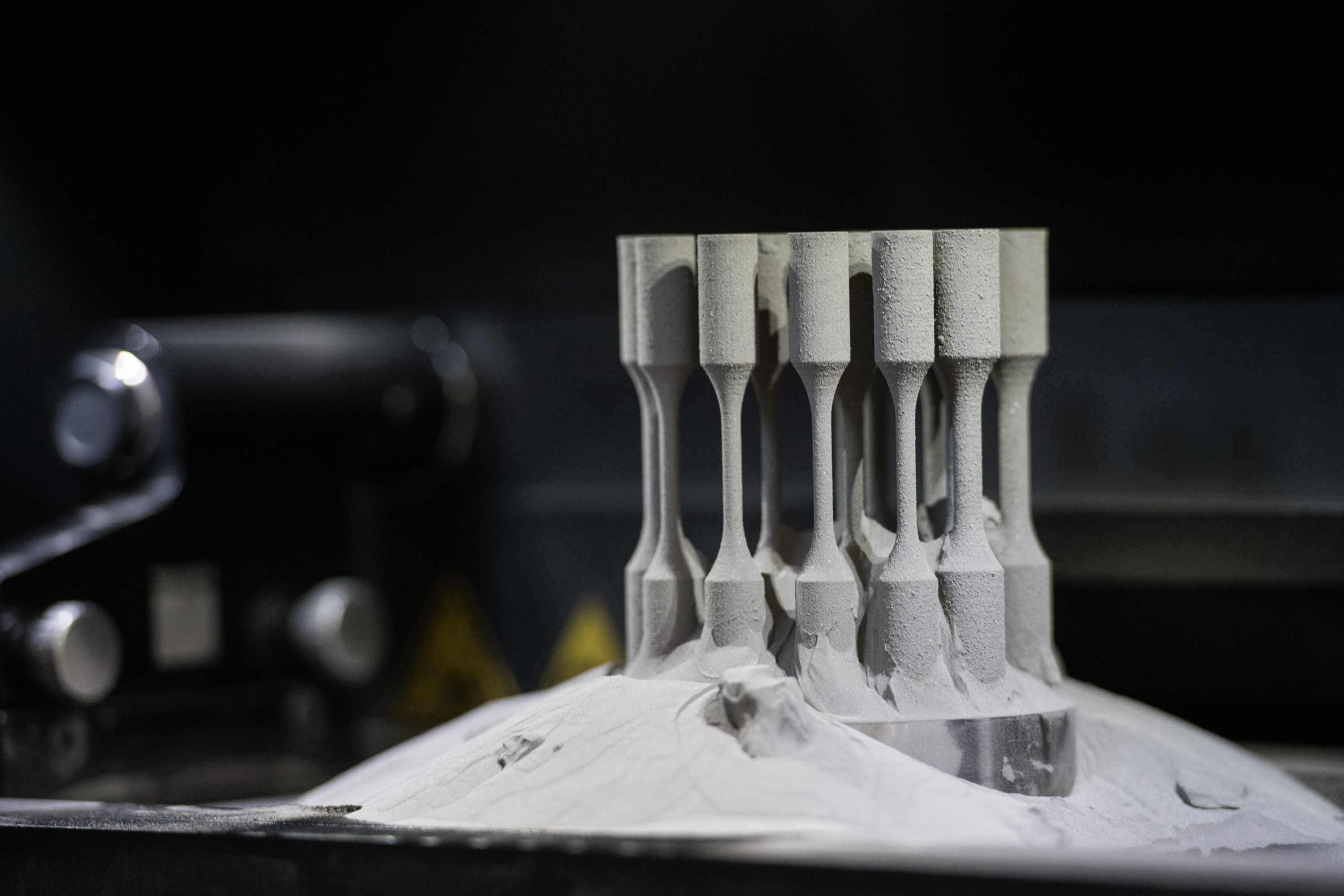
Print finished (excess powder cleaned)

==== Electron beam melting ====
Electron beam melting (EBM) melts metal powder (e.g., titanium alloys) layer by layer with an electron beam in high vacuum, producing void-free parts.

==== Multi-jet fusion ====
Multi-jet fusion (MJF) combines fusing and detailing agents with an inkjet array that it heats to solidify layers without lasers. Binder jetting spreads powder (plaster or resins) and prints binder via inkjet. Selective heat sintering applies heat with a thermal printhead to thermoplastic powder, offering a cheaper, scalable alternative. Another 3D printing approach is the selective fusing of materials in a granular bed. The technique fuses parts of the layer and then moves up, adding layers of granules and repeating the process until the piece is complete. This process uses the unfused media to support overhangs and thin walls, which reduces the need for auxiliary supports. For example, in selective heat sintering, a thermal printhead applies heat to layers of powdered thermoplastic; when a layer is finished, the powder bed moves down, and an automated roller adds a new layer of material to sinter into the next cross-section; using a less intense thermal printhead instead of a laser, a cheaper solution than lasers, and can be scaled down to desktop sizes.

=== Vat photopolymerization ===
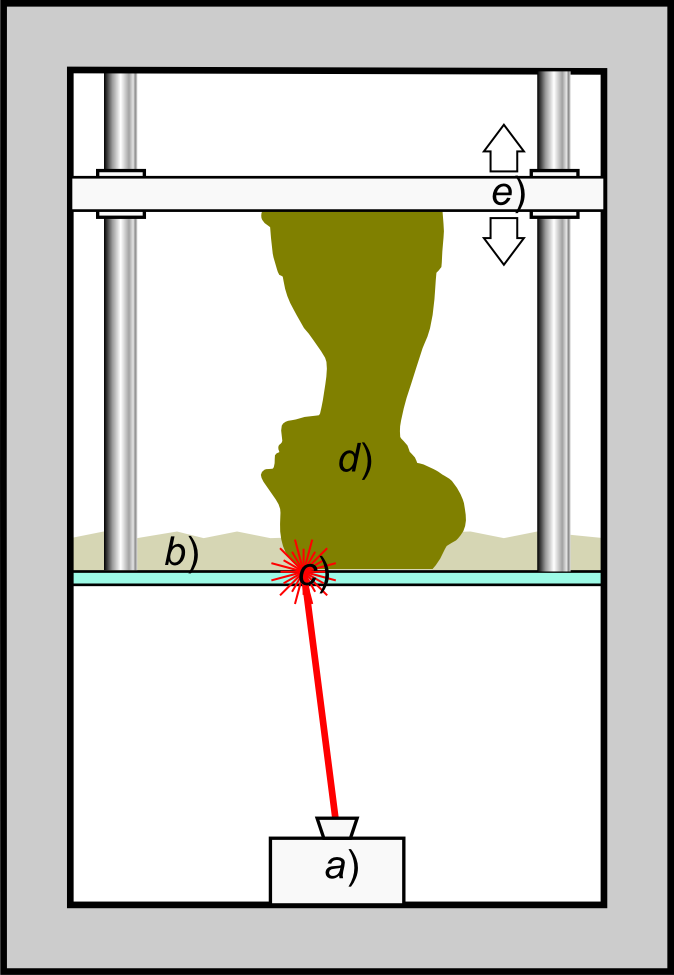
Schematic of stereolithography. Light-emitting device a) (laser or DLP) selectively illuminates transparent bottom c) of tank b) filled with liquid photopolymer resin. Solidified resin d) drags up progressively by lifting platform e).

Vat photopolymerization cures liquid photopolymer resin layer by layer using light sources such as lasers, digital light projectors (DLP), or LEDs. The process exposes resin in a vat to controlled light under safelight conditions. Photopolymerization cross-links monomers, typically via carbon-carbon double bonds in acrylates, when exposed to chromophores or photosensitive additives. The build platform moves incrementally. Excess liquid resin drains after completion. Objet PolyJet systems spray photopolymer in ultra-thin layers (16–30 μm). UV light cures each layer immediately, enabling instant handling without a later curing step. Gel-like supports are removed by hand or water jetting.

The method suits elastomers and ophthalmic lenses.

Multiphoton polymerization uses focused lasers to cure gel only at focal points due to nonlinear photoexcitation. Excess gel washes away. This enables features under 100 nm and complex moving structures.

Mask-image-projection stereolithography slices models into planes, converts slices to masks, and projects them onto resin to cure layers. Some systems support multiple materials.

Continuous liquid interface production (CLIP) uses an oxygen-permeable window below the resin pool to create a persistent liquid "dead zone." This enables continuous extraction of the object, reducing times from hours to minutes.

Dynamic Interface Printing (DIP) submerges a hollow print head with a transparent window into prepolymer. Visible light cures at the air-liquid meniscus. Air pressure and acoustic modulation control the interface for precision and material flow.

Preceramic polymers enable ceramic printing (e.g., silicon carbide) via photopolymerization. Some systems solidify synthetic resin with LEDs.

Powder-fed directed-energy deposition melts supplied metal powder with a laser, a localized analog of selective laser sintering.

Vat photopolymerization is widely used for 3D printing of ceramic materials such as alumina and zirconia. Preceramic polymers also enable ceramic printing (e.g., silicon carbide) via photopolymerization.

The precision of ceramic vat photopolymerization is often challenged by light scattering and lateral overcure, which can obstruct fine internal features. Recent research has established quantitative frameworks for printing "vascular ceramics" with embedded internal channels. By optimizing cure depth-to-layer height ratios and applying geometric pre-compensation to account for symmetric tapering, fully enclosed channels can be achieved.

=== Computed axial lithography ===
Computed axial lithography reverses the principle of computed tomography (CT) to create prints in photo-curable resin. It was developed by a collaboration between the University of California, Berkeley with Lawrence Livermore National Laboratory. It creates objects using a series of 2D images projected onto a cylinder of resin. It is notable for its ability to build objects more quickly than other resin methods and can embed objects within the prints.

=== Liquid additive manufacturing ===
Liquid additive manufacturing (LAM) is an additive manufacturing technique which deposits a liquid or highly viscous material (e.g. Liquid Silicone Rubber) onto a build surface to create an object, which is then vulcanised using heat to harden it. The process was created by Adrian Bowyer and extended by German company RepRap.

Programmable tooling involves creating a temporary mold, which is then filled via a conventional injection molding process and then immediately dissolved.

=== Lamination ===
In some printers, paper can be used as the build material, lowering costs. These printers that cut cross-sections out of special adhesive coated paper using a carbon dioxide laser and laminates them.

Alternatively, ordinary sheets of office paper can be cut by a tungsten carbide blade, followed by selective deposition of adhesive and pressure to bond layers.

Other printers print laminated objects using plastic and metal sheets.

Ultrasonic consolidation (UC) or ultrasonic additive manufacturing (UAM) is a low temperature additive technique for metals.

=== Directed energy deposition (DED) ===
==== Powder-fed directed-energy deposition ====
A high-power laser melts metal powder supplied to the focus of the laser beam. The laser beam typically travels through the center of the deposition head and is lens-focused to a small spot. The build occurs on an X-Y table which is driven by a tool path created from a digital model. The deposition head is moved vertically as each layer is completed.

Some systems make use of 5-axis or 6-axis systems (i.e. articulated arms) capable of delivering material on the substrate (a printing bed, or a pre-existing part) with few to no spatial access restrictions. Metal powder is delivered and distributed around the head or can be split by an internal manifold and delivered through nozzles arranged around the deposition head. A hermetically sealed chamber filled with inert gas or a local inert shroud gas (sometimes combined) are often used to shield the melt pool from atmospheric oxygen, to limit oxidation and better control material properties.

The powder-fed directed-energy process is similar to selective laser sintering, but the metal powder is projected only where material is to be added to the part at that moment. The laser heats and creates a "melt pool" on the substrate, in which the new powder is injected quasi-simultaneously.

The process supports materials including titanium, stainless steel, aluminum, tungsten, and other specialty materials as well as composites and functionally graded material. The process can build new metal parts, but can also add material to existing parts, supporting coatings, repair, and hybrid manufacturing applications. LENS (Laser Engineered Net Shaping), is one example.

==== Metal wire processes ====
Laser-based wire-feed systems, such as laser metal deposition-wire (LMD-w), feed wire through a nozzle that is melted by a laser using inert gas shielding in either an open environment (gas surrounding the laser), or in a sealed chamber. Electron beam freeform fabrication uses an electron beam heat source inside a vacuum chamber.

It is also possible to use conventional gas metal arc welding attached to a 3D stage to 3-D print metals such as steel, bronze and aluminum. Low-cost open source RepRap-style 3-D printers have been outfitted with Arduino-based sensors and demonstrated reasonable metallurgical properties from conventional welding wire as feedstock.

=== Selective powder deposition ===
In selective powder deposition (SPD), build and support powders are selectively deposited into a crucible, such that the build powder takes the shape of the desired object and support powder fills the rest of the crucible. Then an infill material is applied, such that it comes in contact with the build powder. Then the crucible is fired in a kiln between the melting point of the infill and the powders. When the infill melts, it soaks the build powder. But it doesn't soak the support powder, because the support powder is chosen to not be wettable by the infill. If at the firing temperature, the atoms of the infill material and the build powder are mutually defusable, such as with copper powder and zinc infill, then the resulting material is a uniform mixture of those atoms, in this case, bronze. But if the atoms are not mutually defusable, such as tungsten and copper at 1100°C, then the resulting material is a composite. To prevent shape distortion, the firing temperature must be below the solidus temperature of the resulting alloy.

=== Cryogenic ===
Cryogenic 3D printing is a collection of techniques that forms solid structures by freezing liquid materials as they are deposited. As each liquid layer is applied, it is cooled by the low temperature of the previous layer and printing environment which solidifies it. Cryogenic techniques requires a controlled printing environment. The ambient temperature must be below the material's freezing point to ensure the structure remains solid during manufacturing and the humidity must remain low to prevent frost formation between layers. Materials typically include water and water-based solutions, such as brine, slurry, and hydrogels. Cryogenic techniques include rapid freezing prototype (RFP), low-temperature deposition manufacturing (LDM), and freeze-form extrusion fabrication (FEF).

=== Electrochemical ===
Electrochemical additive manufacturing (ECAM) is as a cluster of technologies with the potential to fabricate 3D micro/nanostructures within diverse materials. ECAM technologies include localized electrochemical deposition (LED), meniscus-confined electrodeposition (MCED), electrohydrodynamic redox printing (EHD-RP), fluid FM electrodeposition, and scanning ion conductance microscopy (SICM). The electrolyte of a target metal is placed inside a glass capillary pipette. An electronic-ionic circuit is formed by a liquid capillary created between the pipette's tip and the conductive substrate. Metal ions reduce (release oxygen) when a voltage is applied and deposit on the substrate. Precision positioners control the pipette in three dimensions, creating the necessary three-dimensional objects. Manufacturing happens at nearl room temperature and produces fewer thermal defects. It permits feature resolutions in the 30-50 micrometer range. ECAM is under consideration as a technique for manufacturing advanced copper cooling plates for data centers that provide 98% reductions in energy consumption for cooling.

== Printers ==
=== Industry ===
As of October 2012, additive manufacturing systems ranged from $2,000 to $500,000 in price and were employed in industries including aerospace, architecture, automotive, defense, and medical replacements. These devices are used for prototyping, jig making, fixturing, fixing small custom components, and complete products.

Higher end 3-D printers have now become relatively common for production and additive manufacturing. For example, General Electric uses additive manufacturing to build turbine parts. Rapid prototyping saves time and reduces complexity. Volkswagen uses 3D printers to print tooling, jigs and fixtures. As of 2018 they estimated that 3D printers save €250,000 per year in costs. One 2018 report estimated that almost 75% of desktop 3D printers made are used in industry.

Military and defense systems also incorporating the use of 3D printers. The Royal Netherlands Air Force is using desktop 3D printers to make fixtures and alignment tools. Hill Air Force Base uses 3D printed parts to replace jet parts.

Higher education is a major buyer of desktop and professional 3D printers. In higher education, 3D printing is used to fabricate equipment. For example, chemists can 3D print flow reactor systems that would otherwise exceed typical budgets, such as a device created at the UCL School of Pharmacy in the UK. Many libraries house smaller 3D printers for educational and community access.

=== Consumer ===
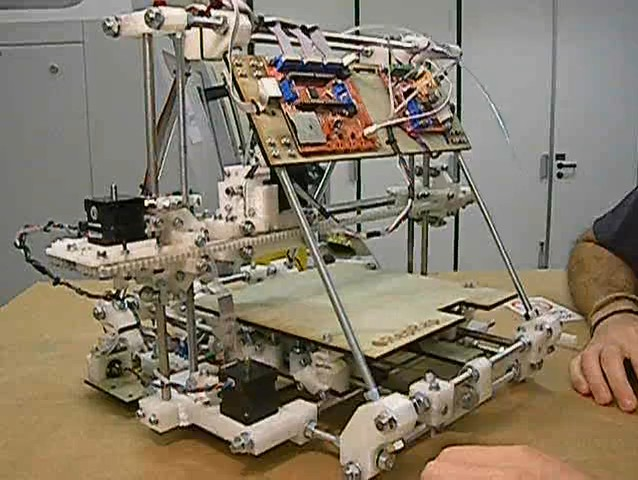
RepRap version 2.0 (Mendel)

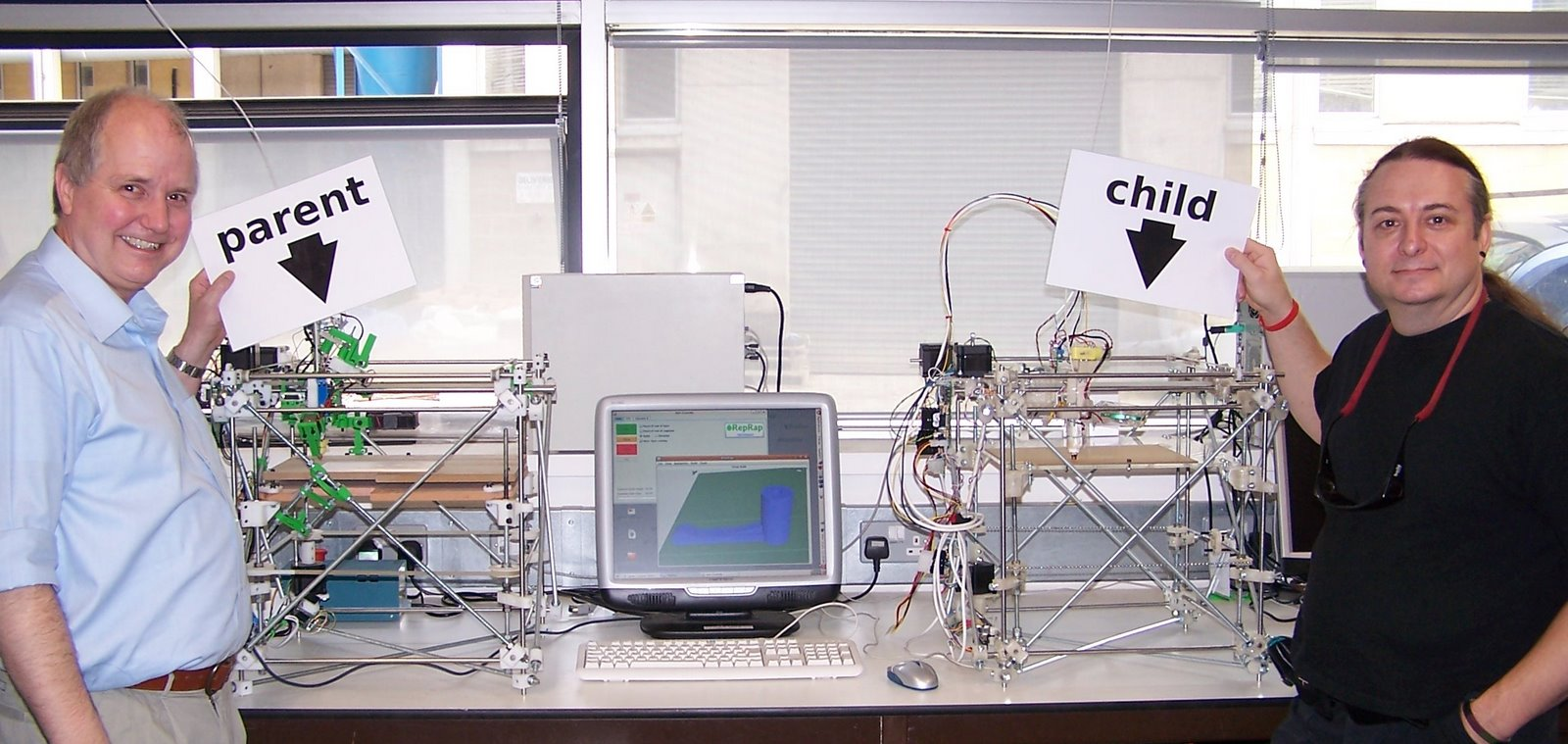
All of the plastic parts for the machine on the right were produced by the machine on the left. Adrian Bowyer (left) and Vik Olliver (right) are members of the RepRap project.

DIY/Maker/enthusiast/early adopter communities, with ties to the academic and hacker communities, led consumer-level adoption.

RepRap Project is one of the longest running desktop projects. It aims to produce a free and open source hardware (FOSH) 3D printer, under the GNU General Public License that is capable of replicating itself by printing many of its own parts. RepRaps can print circuit boards and metal parts. As of 2016, the most popular 3D printer was the Prusa i3, a RepRap printer.

Many related projects have used RepRap for inspiration, creating an ecosystem of related or derivative 3D printers, most of which are also open-source. Development of open source 3D printers enables greater customization and the use of public domain designs to fabricate open source appropriate technology.

The cost of 3D printers decreased dramatically after about 2010, with machines that used to cost $20,000 falling below $1,000. The open source Fab@Home project has developed printers for general use with anything that can be squirted through a nozzle, from chocolate to silicone sealant and chemical reactants.

In addition, several RecycleBots such as the commercialized Filastruder have been designed and fabricated to convert waste plastic, such as shampoo containers and milk jugs, into inexpensive RepRap filament.

=== Large 3D printers ===
Larger 3D printers have been developed for industrial, education, and demonstrative uses.

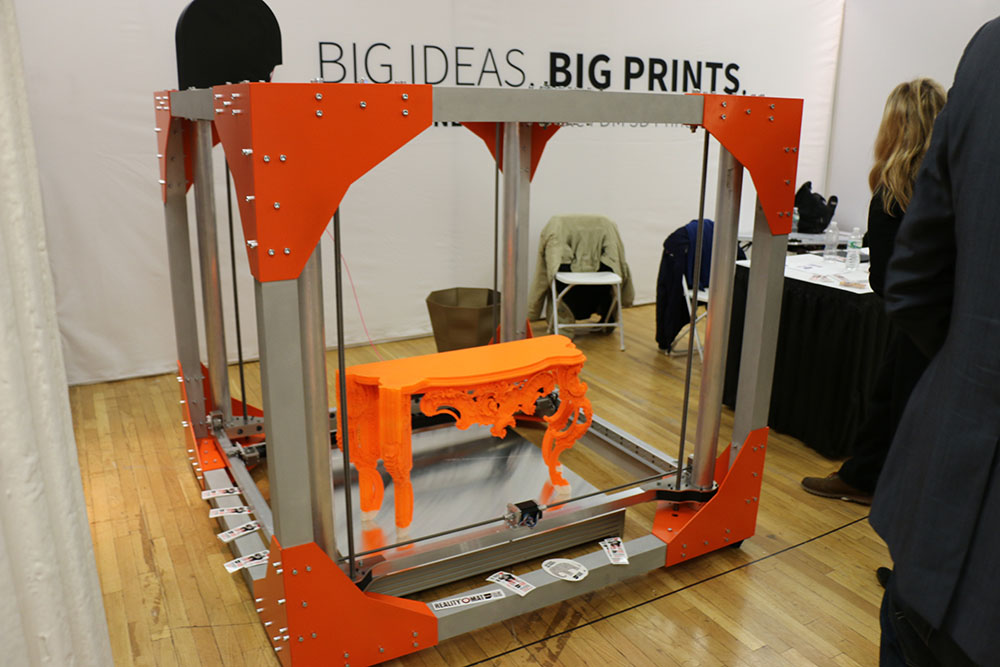
The BigRep One.1 with its 1 m^{3} volume.

Another type of large printer is big area additive manufacturing (BAAM). The goal is to develop printers that can produce a large object in high speed. Another BAAM machine developed by Lockheed Martin aims to print objects up to 100 feet (30 m) long to be used in aerospace industries.

=== Microscale and nanoscale printers ===
Microelectronic device fabrication methods can be employed to print nanoscale objects. Such printed objects are typically grown on a substrate, e.g., a silicon wafer, to which they adhere after printing as they are too small and fragile to be manipulated post-deposition.

In one technique, 3D nanostructures are printed by moving a dynamic stencil mask during the deposition process, somewhat analogous to the extrusion method of traditional 3D printers. Programmable-height nanostructures with resolutions as small as 10 nm have been produced in this fashion, by metallic physical vapor deposition using a mechanical piezo-actuator controlled stencil mask having a milled nanopore in a silicon nitride membrane.

Another method enhances the photopolymerization process on a much smaller scale, using finely-focused lasers controlled by adjustable mirrors. This method produced objects with feature resolutions of 100 nm as of 2013. Onr micron -wide, millimetre-long copper wires have been printed using lasers.

== See also ==
- 3D printing
- Applications of 3D printing
- Construction 3D printing
- List of 3D printing software
- List of 3D printer manufacturers
