= Microstructures in 3D printing =

The use of microstructures in 3D printing, where the thickness of each strut scale of tens of microns ranges from 0.2mm to 0.5mm, has the capabilities necessary to change the physical properties of objects (metamaterials) such as: elasticity, resistance, and hardness. In other words, these capabilities allow physical objects to become lighter or more flexible. The pattern has to adhere to geometric constraints (shape regulations), and thickness constraints (minimum thickness control), or can be enforced using optimization methods (microstructure shape and topological optimization). Innovations in this field are being discovered in addition to 3D printers being built and researched with the intent to specialize in building structures needing altered physical properties.

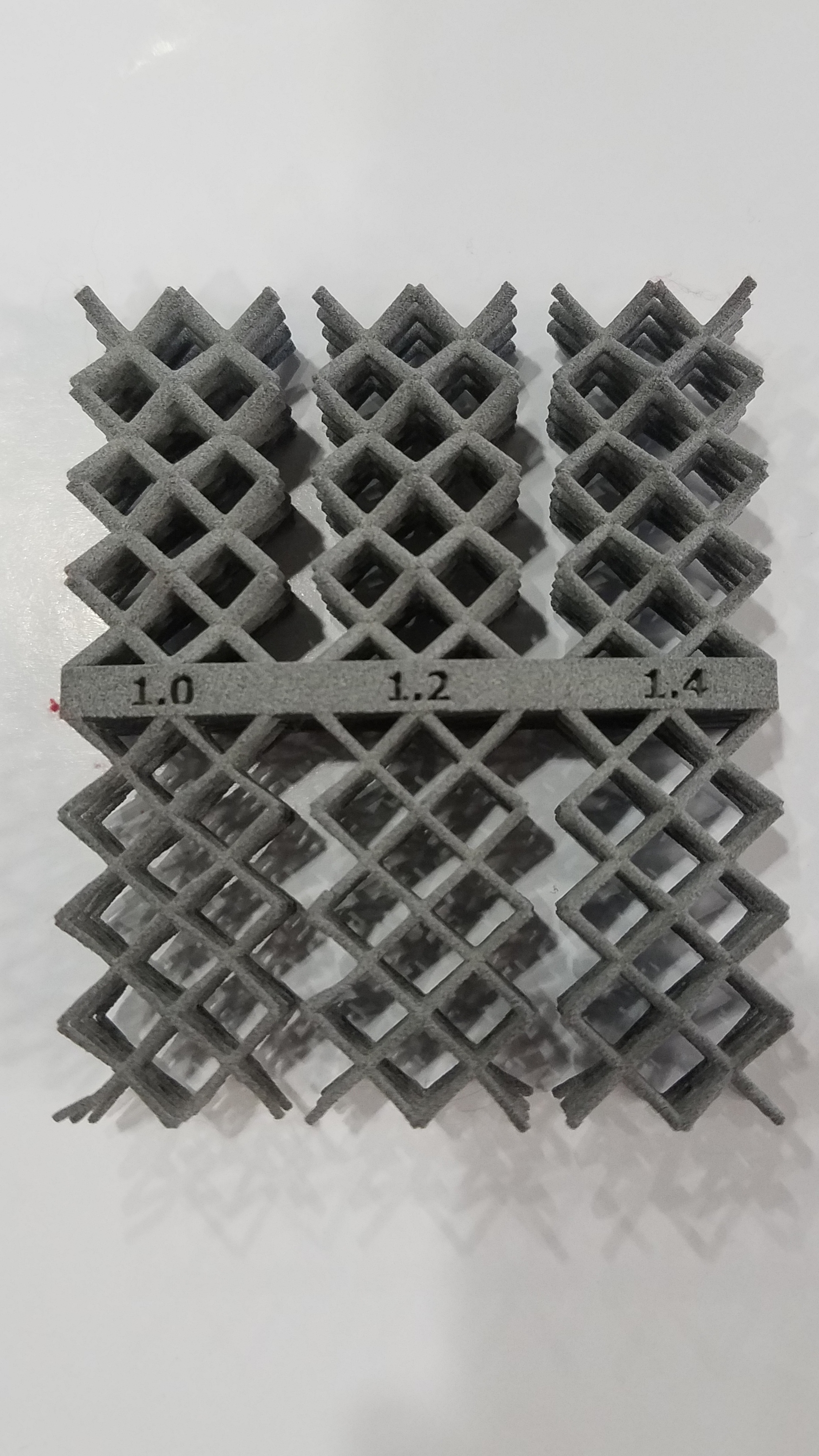
A 3D-printed microstructure with different thicknesses of the lattice to show different elastic behavior.

== Microstructure parameters ==
Elastic deformation materials are described by two major parameters: Poisson's ratio and Young's modulus. However, the alternative elastic constants, Bulk modulus and Shear modulus can also be used. Poisson's ratio defines the ratio between the transversal and axial strain when the object is compressed. Materials with negative Poisson's ratio expand laterally when stretched, in contrast with ordinary materials. In comparing a material's resistance to distort under mechanical load rather than a change in volume, Poisson's ratio offers the fundamental metric by which to compare the performance of any material when strained elastically. The numerical limits are set by 1/2 and -1, between which all stable isotropic materials are found. Young's modulus is a property that measures how rigid or soft an object is. It relates stress (per unit area) to strain (proportional deformation) along an axis or line.

== Microstructure process chain ==
The microstructures are designed synthetically, given the input parameters correlated with the desired deformation behavior. Parameters space sampling allows the creation of a family of related structures able to satisfy the feasibility range of material parameters. The corresponding microstructure of the cell is computed by interpolation. Using microstructure optimization and parameter space sampling, several families of related structures that together satisfy the feasible range of material parameters can be defined. Using these candidates, the best fit is chosen to ensure that neighboring structures are properly connected.

== Steps for additive manufacturing ==
Additive manufacturing design can be divided into two general steps: the pre-processing planning and the process chain. During the pre-processing planning a microstructure design (3D geometric modelling by the use of CAD modelling system) and properties are modelled (factors and parameters).

The process chain of additive manufacturing can be synthesized in the following five steps:

1. Microstructure 3D modelling
This is the most time-consuming part of the process chain. 3D geometry is modeled via computer-aided design (CAD), including numerical control stress analysis and finite element method (FEM).

2. Data conversion and transmission
An optimization method for sampling structures is used that exhibits the range of desired behaviors but keeps the structures sufficiently similar to allow interpolation. The process is repeated, adding new structures to increase the coverage of the material space. The solid or the surface model to be built is converted into the appropriate format. The STL file format originated from 3D systems, which pioneered the stereo-lithography system, can be cited in that case.

3. Checking and preparing
As its name implies, CAD errors, models and non-robustness of the CAD-STL interface are being checked.

4. Building
The material is built in relation to the constraints (elasticity, thickness, connectivity, toughness).

5. Post-processing
Manual operations are necessary at this stage for cleaning or extracting the builder material depending on the printing method used (SLS, FDM with resin) or remove the support (SLA postcuting).

Depending on the quality of the model and results of steps 3 through 5 respectively, the process may be iterated until a satisfactory model or part is achieved.

== Microstructures optimization ==
=== Pattern optimization ===
To create a microstructure, first, a kind of tile has to be designed which provides isotropy, for example, a cube. By assigning nodes to the vertices, the edges, the surfaces, and one node to the interior of the shape of the tile, it is possible to connect these nodes. These connections are the parts which will be printed, and the choice of which nodes will be connected with other nodes determines the properties and stability of the microstructure. Therefore, maximizing the edge space and the vertex space is important to achieve an optimized microstructure. However, the following two attributes have to be met to be able to print the structure:

==== Printability ====
Printability can be achieved by ensuring that for every set of connected nodes on one level, there is at least one node which is connected to another node located lower in the structure. This criterion obviously does not have to be met for the lowest level. In addition to that, the edges between the nodes have to be sufficiently thick.

==== Tileability ====
In order to be connectable, the set of nodes which are on the surface of the tile must be the same on every side. This means if two tiles are put together, the respective nodes must connect. The actual microstructure consists of these tiles which are connected through the nodes on the tile-surface.

=== Shape optimization ===
Geometric complexity in 3D printing requires the control of the material parameters and therefore their properties to produce microstructures which can achieve different behaviors. Shape optimization can perfectly improve stress concentration. Based on the assumption that curvature variation and negatively curved regions generated high stress regions, introduces a low dimensional parametric shape model to eliminate sharp concave corners, which supports minimization of maximal stress and an efficient implementation of printability constraint. Shape optimization is based on the thickness of the deposited material to reduce the stress concentration by first accurately representing shells in the shape of conic by the use of the CAD, and then derived by sensitivity analysis the stress required.

=== Topology optimization ===
Bendsøe and Kikuchi can be considered as the pioneers in the microstructure topology optimization domain, which was originally intended for the design of mechanical structures. In additive manufacturing, topology optimization is considered an efficient method to find the right topologies by running optimization algorithms targeting the prescribed properties. The effective properties of the material structures are found using a numerical homogenization method, and then the topology optimization is applied to find the best distribution of material phases that extremizes the objective function. The Inverse homogenization method has been introduced to achieve specific macro-scale behaviors with desired Poisson's ratio. The inverse homogenization method plus constraint approach has been extended to design mechanical properties. A proposed data-driven approach encodes the variability in properties into a viable finite-dimensional stochastic model with prescribed constraints and optimized to obtain the target properties. One of the problems in topology optimization is the increasing number of parameters due to the linear number of cells in the object. Two approaches have been investigated to resolve this complexity. First, working with microstructures corresponding to blocks of voxels instead of individual voxels directly. Second, ignoring the microstructure geometry and considering only the macroscopic behavior.

== Printing methods used for microstructures ==
Additive manufacturing is used for the realization of complex material composition in 3D printing. Different techniques can be used to create microstructures, but they need to be able to print thin and complex structures.

FDM
When using FDM to print microstructures, artifacts can be visible, and if the structure is very thin, the risk that the structure breaks is high.

SLS
Selective laser sintering can be used to print complex structures. It does not need any support structures, but the technology can struggle to print very thin structures that are stable enough to not break easily.

SLA
With SLA, it is possible to print in high resolution, but the quality decreases when the resin becomes cloudy.

LOM
The accuracy of this method is limited in comparison to other 3D printing techniques and the amount of details which can be printed is low. This is why LOM is not considered suitable for printing microstructures.

Other Methods
The printing techniques mentioned above are several of the better known 3D printing techniques, but other methods, for example LAM, DIW, or Computed axial lithography, could be used as well.

== Microstructures applications ==
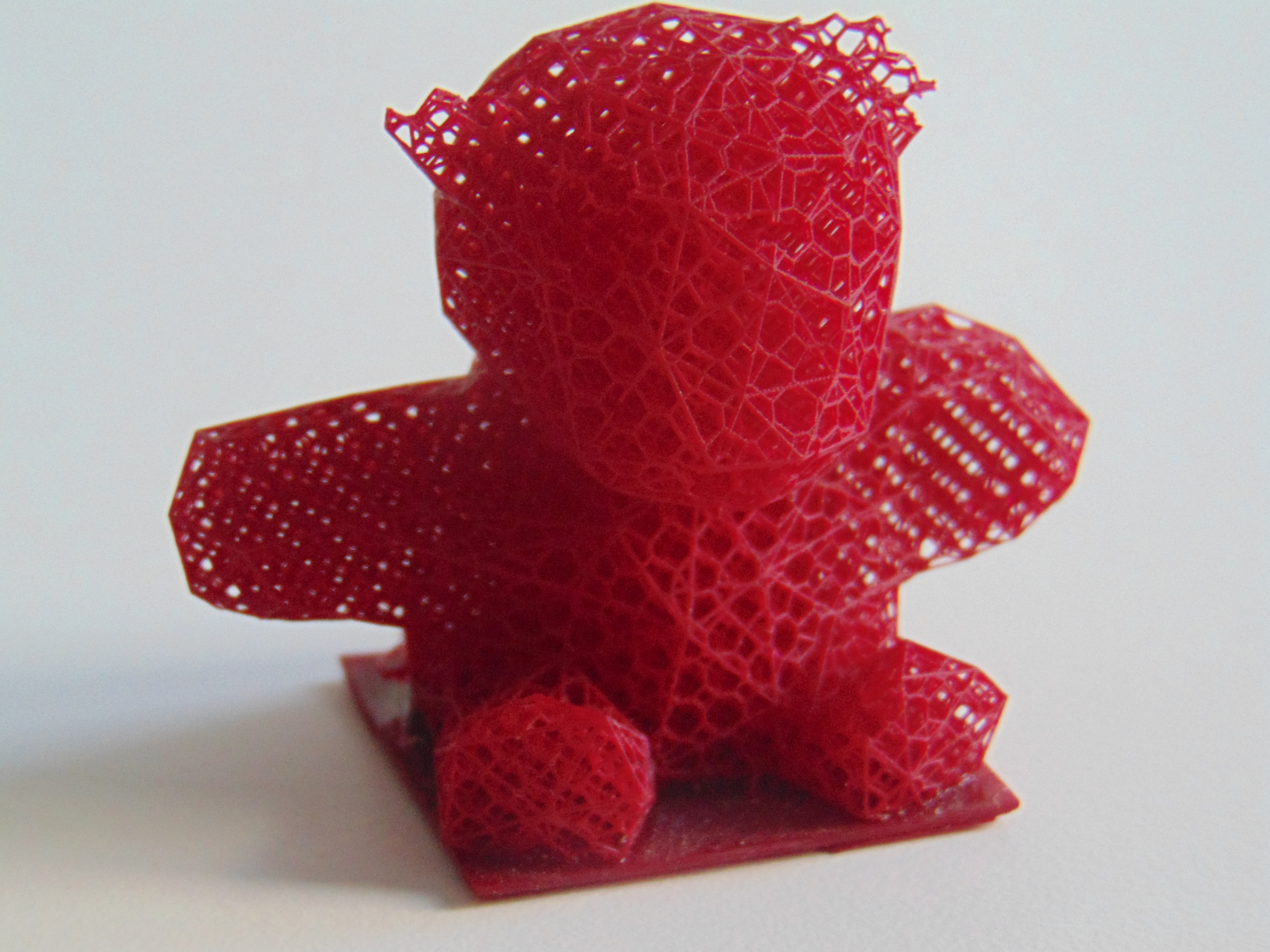
Microstructures used in a toy bear.

Possible applications of microstructures are the fabrication of plastic toys using metamaterials to give them an elastic behavior. The design of microstructures brings possibilities of realizing novel properties beyond traditional materials, and the use in different domains such as mechanical engineering, aeronautics, astronomy, and electronics, based on their deformation, compression, light, sound, thermal and mechanical properties. In the medical domain, applications have been demonstrated with the ability to synthesize tissue, or to fabricate prosthetics or manufacturing bone with biomaterial. Other examples of applications of microstructures are the creation of sound absorbing material, using them as a catalyst, to create custom structures or just for design purposes.
