= Laser metal deposition =

Additive manufacturing process

Laser metal deposition (LMD) or laser directed energy deposition is an additive manufacturing process in which a feedstock material (typically a powder) is melted with a laser and then deposited onto a substrate. A variety of pure metals and alloys can be used as the feedstock, as well as composite materials such as metal matrix composites. Laser sources with a wide variety of intensities, wavelengths, and optical configurations can be used. While LMD is typically a melt-based process, this is not a requirement, as discussed below. Melt-based processes typically have a strength advantage, due to achieving a full metallurgical fusion.

Synonyms include laser powder forming and the proprietary laser engineered net shaping, additive manufacturing technologies developed for fabricating metal parts directly from a computer-aided design (CAD) solid model by using a metal powder injected into a molten pool created by a focused, high-powered laser beam. The process can also make "near" net shape parts when it is not possible to make an item to exact specifications. In these cases post-production process like light machining, surface finishing, or heat treatment may be applied to achieve end compliance. Other trademarked techniques include direct metal deposition (DMD) and laser consolidation (LC). Compared to processes that use powder beds, such as selective laser melting (SLM) objects created with this technology can be substantially larger, even up to several feet long.

== Laser source ==
As with selective laser melting, the laser power does not have to be especially high as long as the laser energy is sufficiently concentrated. The achievable rate of material addition depends on both the amount of laser power applied, and the heat of fusion of the feedstock and substrate materials. As different materials absorb different wavelengths of light, it is important that the wavelength of the laser source is appropriately matched to the material's absorption spectrum, to ensure that the amount of energy absorbed by the material is maximised. For example, using LMD to deposit steel is efficiently performed using IR laser sources, while for copper-based alloys green lasers have better absorption.

== Types ==
Several different LMD processes exist, with both the feedstock and laser energy being delivered in different ways and at different locations.

=== Pre-placed powder ===
The simplest LMD technique involves pre-placed powders. A powder feedstock is placed onto the surface or a substrate, and a focused laser is then scanned or rastered over it, causing the feedstock to melt and fuse with the substrate. Typically an inert shielding gas is used to reduce the oxidation around the melt zone. This process is similar to selective laser melting, which involves a systematic layer by layer process building an object by selective laser fusion within a bed of powder.

=== Conventional ===
In conventional powder-fed LMD, a powder nozzle or nozzles are used, along with a focused laser source. The laser is focused onto the substrate to form a melt pool. Simultaneously, powder is sprayed out of the nozzle as a powder jet plume, directing material into the melt pool, where it melts. As the laser source moves away, the melt pool follows, with the material at the previous location solidifying. This process is typically achieved using a laser cladding head, which integrates the powder nozzles and the laser optics into one assembly, with both focused at a single target location. The size and area of the melt pool and the powder plume can vary widely, and may take on spot or line configurations, depending on the target application. As for powder-placed LMD, a shielding gas is typically used to minimise oxidation. The carrier gas used to deliver the powder is also typically a shielding gas. The LMD process can be used in many ways, such as by scanning over a wide surface to build up a thin (< 1 mm) coating (typically called laser cladding) or by rastering over one particular area as an additive manufacturing process to build up objects in 3D layer by layer (sometimes referred to as directed energy deposition).

=== High speed ===
High-speed LMD (also known as EHLA) differs from conventional LMD in the focal point of the laser, and in the speed of the cladding process. For high-speed LMD, the focal point is located above the substrate. As powder is sprayed through the focal point, most of the laser energy is absorbed by the powder, where it melts in-flight. This results in molten powder feedstock impacting the substrate, where heat is transferred from the powder into the substrate. This typically results in a lower portion of thermal energy being transferred into the substrate, and as a result high-speed LMD produces a thinner weld bead deposit (typically < 0.5 mm per pass) with lower dilution and a thinner heat-affected zone compared to conventional LMD. The speed of deposition (the velocity of the melt location on the substrate surface) is typically at least 10 times higher than the speed of conventional LMD, and the rate of material solidification is also faster. The typical effect of these differences, compared to conventional LMD, is a deposit with smoother surface finish, finer grain microstructure, improved corrosion resistance, and higher hardness. Both 2D coatings and 3D additive manufacturing are also possible using high-speed LMD.

Meltio commercializes a wire-laser DED system featuring a coaxial multi-laser deposition head that enables omnidirectional deposition. Its systems use commercially available welding wire (0.8–1.2 mm diameter) as feedstock and are available in blue laser (450 nm) and infrared (976 nm) configurations. This technology has been adopted by the defense forces of the United States, France, Spain, and South Korea.

=== Wire feed ===
Similar to welding processes, LMD can be performed using a metal wire as the feedstock. This can be an advantage the avoids the cost and effort required to produce a feedstock powder.

=== Supersonic ===
Supersonic LMD is different from the other LMD processes in that the laser is not used to melt materials. Instead, this is primarily a modified cold spraying process, which is a type of solid-state deposition process involving deposition via a supersonic jet plume of powder. In Supersonic LMD a laser is used to pre-heat the substrate and the powder stream, in order to soften these materials. By avoiding melting, and by operating at a lower temperature, this reduces the chance for oxidation of the feedstock and substrate materials to occur.

== See also ==
- Selective laser melting
- Laser beam welding
- Laser cutting
- Additive Manufacturing
