= UAM =

UAM or Uam may refer to:

== Universities ==
- Arturo Michelena University (Universidad Arturo Michelena), Valencia, Venezuela
- Autonomous University of Madrid (Universidad Autonóma de Madrid), Spain
- Universidad Autónoma Metropolitana, Mexico
- University Art Museum, Santa Barbara, University of California, Santa Barbara, U.S.
- University of Arkansas at Monticello, Monticello, Arkansas, U.S.
- Adam Mickiewicz University in Poznań (Uniwersytet im. Adama Mickiewicza), Poznań, Poland
- University of Agriculture, Makurdi, Nigeria

== Computing ==
- Universal Access Method, an authentication method for a WiFi or wired network
- User activity monitoring
- Unified access management

== Other uses ==
- African and Malagasy Union (Union Africaine et Malgache)
- The French Union of Modern Artists (Union des artistes modernes)
- Uam, a 2009 album by Scottish musician Julie Fowlis
- Ultrasonic additive manufacturing, an additive manufacturing technology
- Unión Atlético Maracaibo, a Venezuelan professional football team
- The IATA code and FAA identifier for Andersen Air Force Base, Guam
- The Indian Railways station code for Udhagamandalam railway station, Ooty, Tamil Nadu
- Urban Air Mobility (Transportation)
- United Aborigines Mission, a Christian mission in Australia that ran residential institutions for Aboriginal children
