= Material extrusion-based additive manufacturing =

Material extrusion-based additive manufacturing (EAM) represents one of the seven categories of 3D printing processes, defined by the ISO international standard 17296-2. While it is mostly used for plastics, under the name of FDM or FFF, it can also be used for metals and ceramics. In this additive manufacturing process category, the feedstock materials are mixtures of a polymeric binder (from 40% to 60% by volume) and a fine grain solid powder of metal or ceramic materials. Similar type of feedstock is also used in the metal injection molding (MIM) and in the ceramic injection molding (CIM) processes. The extruder pushes the material towards a heated nozzle thanks to

- the controlled axial movement of a piston inside a heated barrel,
- or the controlled axial rotation of a screw inside a heated barrel,
- or the controlled rotation of two feeding rollers.

== Process of creating EAM metal parts ==
The process for creating material extruded metal parts typically involves several stages, transforming them from plastic/metal composites to fully metal parts.

- Printing: The process begins with printing the part using a filament containing metal powder bound in plastic. This filament, similar to that used in conventional FFF printers, is infused with metal. The printer deposits the metal-infused filament layer by layer, building up the shape of the part. These printed parts are referred to as "green" parts. To compensate for predictable shrinkage during the subsequent sintering process, the green parts are scaled up by 15-20% from their final dimensions.
- Debinding: After printing, the green parts are placed in a debinding station. In this step, an organic solvent dissolves most of the plastic binding material. Consequently, the green parts transition into "brown" parts. The debinding process eliminates excess plastic, leaving behind a structure of metal powder.
- Sintering: The brown parts, now washed, are transferred to a sintering furnace. This furnace adheres to a material-specific profile, depending on the material used. Initially, it burns away any remaining binder. Subsequently, it consolidates the metal powder, transforming it into a fully dense, finished metal part. The sintering process is integral as it ensures that the part attains its required mechanical properties.
- Use: At this stage, the part becomes a fully metal component, ready for use.

== History ==
=== R&D developments ===
- In 1995, the Fraunhofer IFAM designed a Rapid Prototyping system, starting from a powder‐binder mixture which is squeezed out through a computer‐controlled nozzle. Parts are manufactured layer by layer and the “green parts” are debinded and sintered to reach their final density; IFAM restarted this line of research in 2017;
- In 1998, the concept of hybrid, additive/subtractive Shape Deposition Manufacturing for ceramics was proposed and tested at Carnegie Mellon University
- In year 2000, a system was developed at Rutgers University for the solid freeform fabrication of multiple ceramic actuators and sensors, starting from green ceramic filaments
- In 2005, a system was development at the Drexel University, based on material extrusion, consisting of a mini-extruder with a single screw mounted on a high-precision positioning system, fed with bulk material in granulated form (pellets);
- In 2015, a 3d printing machine was developed at Politecnico di Milano for MIM metals and CIM ceramics, based on extrusion of pellets with a stationary piston-based extruder over a reversed Delta Robot table;
- In 2016, developments in multi-material printing have enabled material extrusion printers to utilize ceramic-based support materials, designed for easy removal. This advancement significantly facilitates the creation of complex geometries, as the support material can be effortlessly broken off after printing. A notable example is Desktop Metal’s machine, which employs a ceramic interface layer on all support structures. This feature ensures that the supports can be snapped off with minimal effort, enhancing the overall efficiency and precision of the printing process.
- In the past few years, advances in material science and the expansion of material extrusion systems at companies like Markforged, Desktop Metal, and ALM3d have expanded the range of materials suitable for material extrusion printers. Some of these materials include: Stainless Steel, Low-Alloy Steel, Tool Steel, Aluminum 6061, Bronze, Chromium Zirconium Copper, Cobalt Chrome, or even gold.

=== Commercial developments ===
After year 2015, some commercial providers of the technology have started proposing their product, mostly for metal applications, e.g.:

- Metal X by Markforged,
- Studio System by Desktop Metal,
- ExAM by AIM3d.
