= Electron-beam freeform fabrication =

3D printing technique

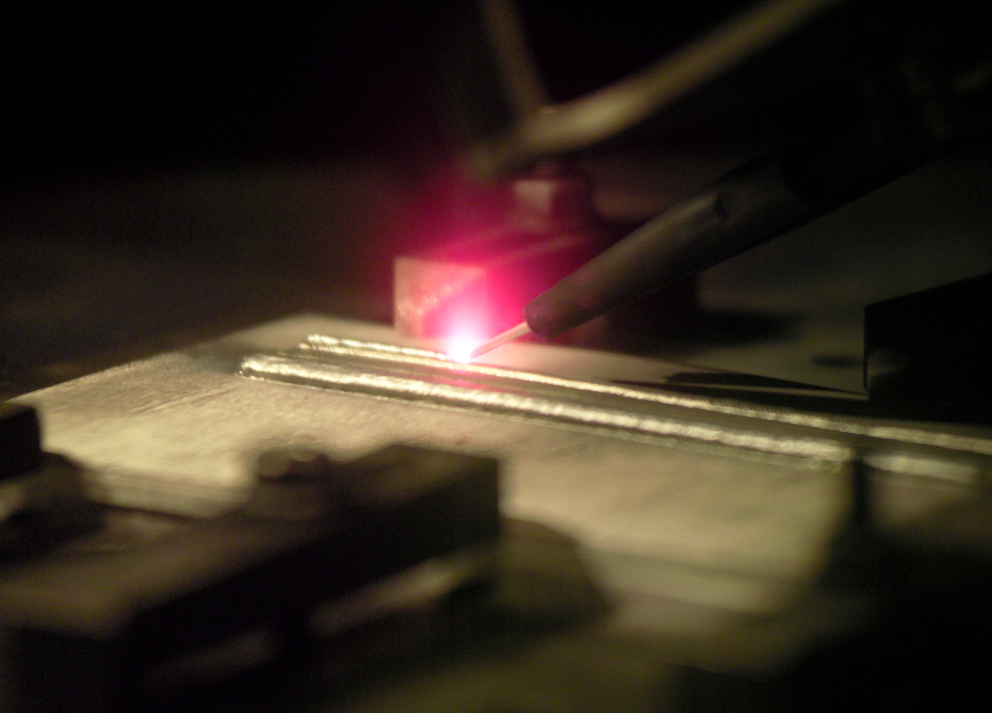
Electron beam freeform fabrication process

Electron-beam freeform fabrication (EBF^{3}) or electron-beam directed energy deposition is an additive manufacturing process that builds near-net-shape parts. It requires far less raw material and finish machining than traditional manufacturing methods. EBF^{3} is done in a vacuum chamber where an electron beam is focused on a constantly feeding source of metal, which is melted and applied as called for by a three-dimensional layered drawing - one layer at a time - on top of a rotating metallic substrate until the part is complete.

== History ==
The use of electron beam welding for additive manufacturing was first developed by Vivek Davé in 1995 as part of his PhD thesis at MIT. The process was referred to as electron beam solid freeform fabrication (EBSFF). A team at NASA Langley Research Center (LaRC) led by Karen Taminger developed the process, calling it electron beam freeform fabrication (EBF^{3}). EBF^{3} is a NASA-patented additive manufacturing process designed to build near-net-shape parts requiring less raw material and finish machining than traditional manufacturing methods. EBF^{3} is a process by which NASA plans to build metal parts in zero-gravity environments; this layer-additive process uses an electron beam and a solid wire feedstock to fabricate metallic parts. Future astronauts stationed on the Moon or Mars may be able to employ EBF3 to produce replacement parts locally rather than relying on parts launched from Earth, possibly even mining feedstock from the surrounding soils. The aviation industry has the most potential for the procedure, say experts at the NASA LaRC, because significant progress should be made in reducing machining waste byproducts. Typically, an aircraft maker would start with a 6,000-pound block of titanium and use thousands of liters of cutting fluid to reduce it to a 300-pound item, leaving 5,700 pounds of material that needed to be recycled. According to Taminger, "With EBF3 you can build up the same part using only 350 pounds of titanium and machine away just 50 pounds to get the part into its final configuration. And the EBF3 process uses much less electricity to create the same part."

== Process ==
The operational concept of EBF^{3} is to build a near-net-shape metal part directly from a computer-aided design (CAD) file. Current computer-aided machining practices start with a CAD model and use a post-processor to write the machining instructions (G-code) defining the cutting tool paths needed to make the part. EBF^{3} uses a similar process, starting with a CAD model, numerically reducing it into layers, then using a post-processor to write the G-code defining the deposition path and process parameters for the EBF^{3} equipment. It uses a focused electron beam in a vacuum environment to create a molten pool on a metallic substrate. The surface of the substrate translates the beam while the metal wire is fed into the molten pool. The deposit solidifies immediately after the electron beam has passed, having sufficient structural strength to support itself. The sequence is repeated in a layer-additive manner to produce a near-net-shape part needing only finish machining. The EBF^{3} process is scalable for components from fractions of an inch to tens of feet, limited mainly by the size of the vacuum chamber and the amount of wire feedstock available.

== See also ==
- Electron-beam additive manufacturing
