= Meltio =

Spanish industrial technology company

Coordinates: 38.0888°N 3.6606°W

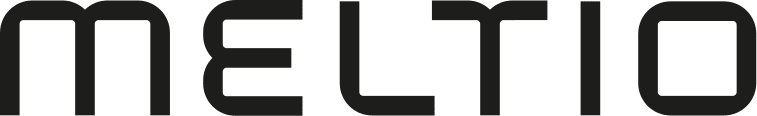
- Type: Private company
- Industry: 3D printing, Additive manufacturing, Industrial technology
- Founded: 2019; 7 years ago Linares, Jaén, Spain
- Headquarters: Linares, Jaén, Spain
- Area served: France, Germany, India, Italy, Mexico, South Korea, Spain, United Kingdom, United States
- Key people: Ángel Llavero López de Villalta (CEO)
- Products: M600, Robot Cell, Engine Robot Integration, Engine CNC Integration
- Revenue: ▲€ 19 million (2024)
- Website: meltio3d.com

Meltio is a Spanish industrial technology company founded in 2019 and based in Linares, Jaén, Spain. The company develops and manufactures systems based on wire-laser Directed Energy Deposition (DED), a form of metal additive manufacturing,

Its systems use metallic wire as feedstock, which is melted by laser diodes arranged in a proprietary printhead to build or repair metal parts layer by layer. This process is applicable across industries including automotive, aerospace, energy, and mining, as well as for maintenance and repair operations.

Meltio recorded revenue growth from approximately €13 million in 2022 to €19 million in 2024. Its technology has been adopted by the defense forces of the United States, France, Spain, and South Korea.

The company operates in the directed energy deposition segment of the industrial metal additive manufacturing market, alongside competitors such as Trumpf, Z-Rapid Tech, and EPlus3D.

== History ==
Meltio was founded in 2019 in Linares, Jaén, Spain, by Ángel Llavero López de Villalta.

Meltio received the 2023 Premio Nacional Pyme del Año (National SME of the Year Award) presented by the Chamber of Commerce of Spain and Banco Santander, at a ceremony presided over by King Felipe VI.

In 2024, Meltio launched the M600, an industrial wire-laser DED system, and the Engine Blue, a robot integration kit for wire-laser deposition, both unveiled at Formnext 2024. The Meltio M600 received the 'Enterprise 3D Printer of the Year (Metals)' award at the 2024 3D Printing Industry Awards.

As of 2025, the company employs over 130 people at its production plant in Linares, which exports approximately 95% of its output.

== Defense applications ==
=== United States Navy ===
In November 2022, a hybrid system of manufacture, consisting of the wire laser deposition head of Meltio integrated into a Haas CNC milling apparatus by the US partner Phillips Corporation, was installed on board the USS Bataan (LHD-5), an amphibious assault vessel of the United States Navy. This installation was the result of a collaborative initiative between the Commander of the Naval Surface Force Atlantic and the Naval Sea Systems Command (NAVSEA) Technology Office. In August 2023, the crew of the USS Bataan used the installed system to fabricate a replacement component for a de-ballast air compressor, restoring the part within five days.

During RIMPAC 2024, a containerized hybrid manufacturing system using Meltio technology was used by the Naval Postgraduate School on board the USS Somerset (LPD-25) to print and replace a pump part, thereby restoring mission capability within 34 hours.

Meltio technology was selected under the United States Department of Defense xTech International Advanced Manufacturing and Materials Program.

=== France ===
French Navy validated Meltio's wire-laser DED technology following a series of operational trials conducted by the Fleet Support Service (FSS) of the Ministry of Armed Forces. The validation concluded during exercise Ursa Minor 2024, a naval maintenance exercise in which Meltio's system, installed at the Toulon base, produced replacement parts for the French aircraft carrier Charles de Gaulle.

=== Spain ===
The Spanish Army and Spanish Air and Space Force have implemented Meltio's technology for the production of vehicle spare parts and for the maintenance of jet engines.

=== South Korea ===
In February 2025, the Republic of Korea Marine Corps Logistics Group deployed a robot-integrated Meltio wire-laser DED system to produce discontinued spare parts for Korean amphibious assault vehicles (KAAV) on-site.

== Research collaborations ==
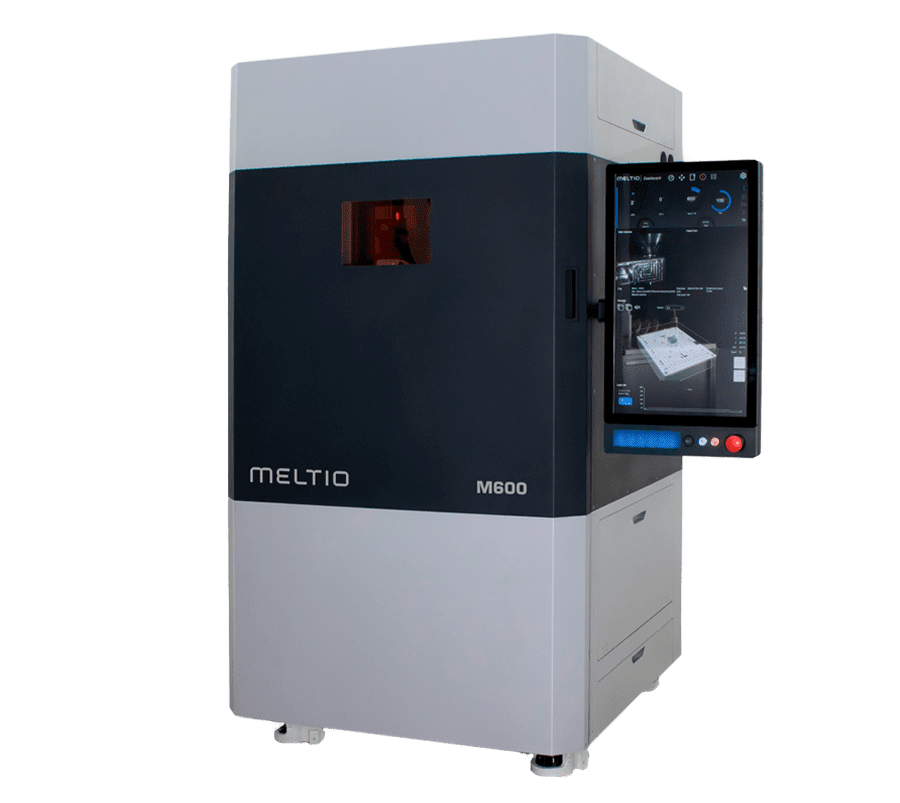
Front view of the Meltio M600 3D printer.

The ATILA project, funded by the Spanish Ministry of Science and the State Research Agency, brings together AIDIMME, a Valencia-based non-profit technological institute specialising in advanced manufacturing, the General University Hospital of Valencia, the University of Salamanca, and Meltio to develop wire-laser DED processes for manufacturing titanium biomedical implants, including hip and knee prostheses.

In 2024, the Manufacturing Technology Centre, an independent research organisation based in Coventry, UK, deployed a Meltio M450 system for research into metal additive manufacturing, with a focus on remanufacturing and repair applications.

A 2024 review published in the MDPI Journal of Manufacturing and Materials Processing identified Meltio's printhead design as a representative implementation of the coaxial multi-laser wire-DED configuration.

In 2025, the Monterrey Institute of Technology and Higher Education deployed a Meltio M450 system for student training and validation of metal additive manufacturing capabilities at industrial level.

A 2026 study published in Materials Today Communications by researchers at the Institute for Advanced Manufacturing (KSF) at Hochschule Furtwangen University, using a Meltio robot-integrated system, examined wire laser cladding on stainless steel substrates and demonstrated the viability of wire-laser DED for surface coating applications.
