= Selective heat sintering =

3D printing technique

Selective heat sintering (SHS) is a type of additive manufacturing process. It works by using a thermal printhead to apply heat to layers of powdered thermoplastic. When a layer is finished, the powder bed moves down, and an automated roller adds a new layer of material which is sintered to form the next cross-section of the model. SHS is best for manufacturing inexpensive prototypes for concept evaluation, fit/form and functional testing. SHS is a Plastics additive manufacturing technique similar to selective laser sintering (SLS), the main difference being that SHS employs a less intense thermal printhead instead of a laser, thereby making it a cheaper solution, and able to be scaled down to desktop sizes.
