= Alumide =

3D printing material

Alumide is a material used in 3D printing consisting of nylon filled with aluminium dust, its name being a combination of the words aluminium and polyamide. Models are printed by sintering a tray of powder, layer by layer. While it is much stiffer than other materials used in 3D printing, it can also withstand much higher thermal loads, maintaining its shape at temperatures that would cause thermoplastic compounds such as polylactic acid to become molten.
