= Laminated object manufacturing =

3D printing technique

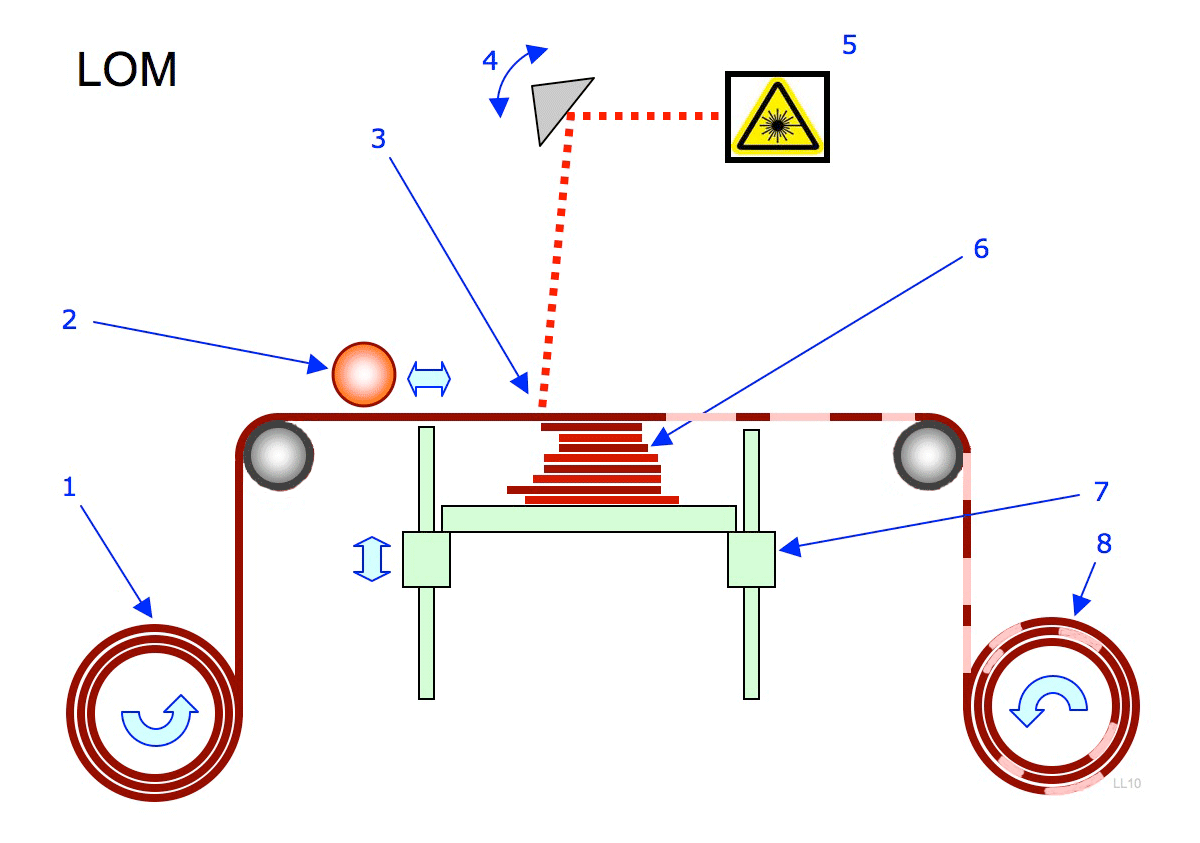
Laminated object manufacturing: 1 Foil supply. 2 Heated roller. 3 Laser beam. 4. Scanning prism. 5 Laser unit. 6 Layers. 7 Moving platform. 8 Waste.

Laminated object manufacturing (LOM) is a rapid prototyping system developed by Helisys Inc. (Cubic Technologies is now the successor organization of Helisys) In it, layers of adhesive-coated paper, plastic, or metal laminates are successively glued together and cut to shape with a knife or laser cutter. Objects printed with this technique may be additionally modified by machining or drilling after printing. Typical layer resolution for this process is defined by the material feedstock and usually ranges in thickness from one to a few sheets of copy paper.

== Process ==
The process is performed as follows:

1. Sheet is adhered to a substrate with a heated roller.
2. Laser traces desired dimensions of prototype.
3. Laser cross hatches non-part area to facilitate waste removal.
4. Platform with completed layer moves down out of the way.
5. Fresh sheet of material is rolled into position.
6. Platform downs into new position to receive next layer.
7. The process is repeated until full model or prototype prepared.

== Note ==
1. Low cost due to readily available raw material.
2. Paper models have wood like characteristics, and may be worked and finished accordingly.
3. Dimensional accuracy is slightly less than that of stereolithography and selective laser sintering but no milling step is necessary.
4. Relatively large parts may be made, because no chemical reaction is necessary.
