= Electron-beam additive manufacturing =

3D printing technique

Electron-beam additive manufacturing, or electron-beam melting (EBM) is a type of additive manufacturing, or 3D printing, for metal parts. The raw material (metal powder or wire) is placed under a vacuum and fused together from heating by an electron beam. This technique is distinct from selective laser sintering as the raw material fuses have completely melted. Selective Electron Beam Melting (SEBM) emerged as a powder bed-based additive manufacturing (AM) technology and was brought to market in 1997 by Arcam AB Corporation headquartered in Sweden.

== Metal powder-based systems ==
Metal powders can be consolidated into a solid mass using an electron beam as the heat source. Parts are manufactured by melting metal powder, layer by layer, with an electron beam in a high vacuum.

This powder bed method produces fully dense metal parts directly from metal powder with characteristics of the target material. The EBM machine reads data from a 3D CAD model and lays down successive layers of powdered material. These layers are melted together utilizing a computer-controlled electron beam. In this way it builds up the parts. The process takes place under vacuum, which makes it suited to manufacture parts in reactive materials with a high affinity for oxygen, e.g. titanium. The process is known to operate at higher temperatures (up to 1000 °C), which can lead to differences in phase formation though solidification and solid-state phase transformation.

The powder feedstock is typically pre-alloyed, as opposed to a mixture. That aspect allows classification of EBM with selective laser melting (SLM), where competing technologies like SLS and DMLS require thermal treatment after fabrication. Compared to SLM and DMLS, EBM has a generally superior build rate because of its higher energy density and scanning method.

Electron-beam melting hardware

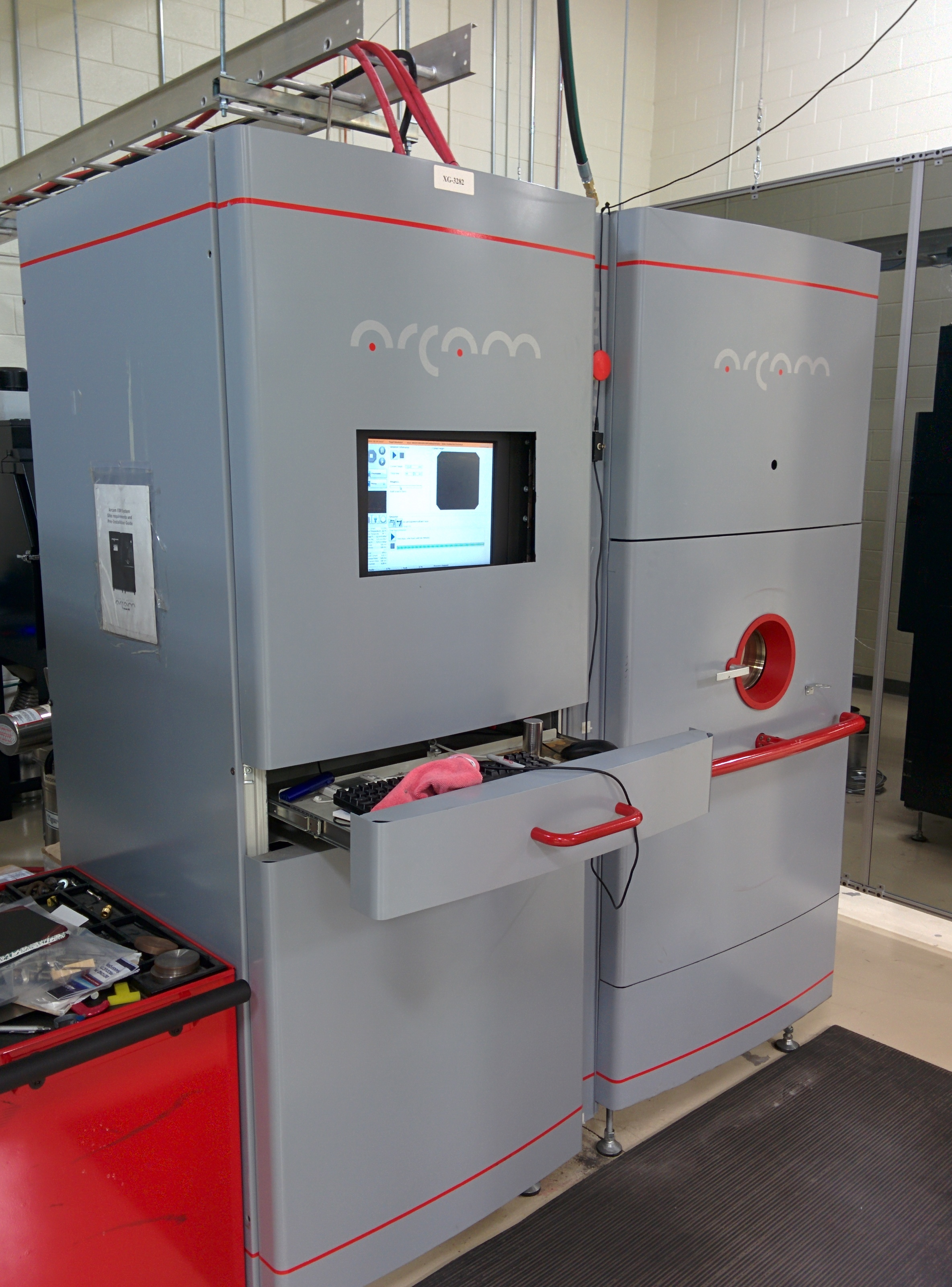
Arcam S12

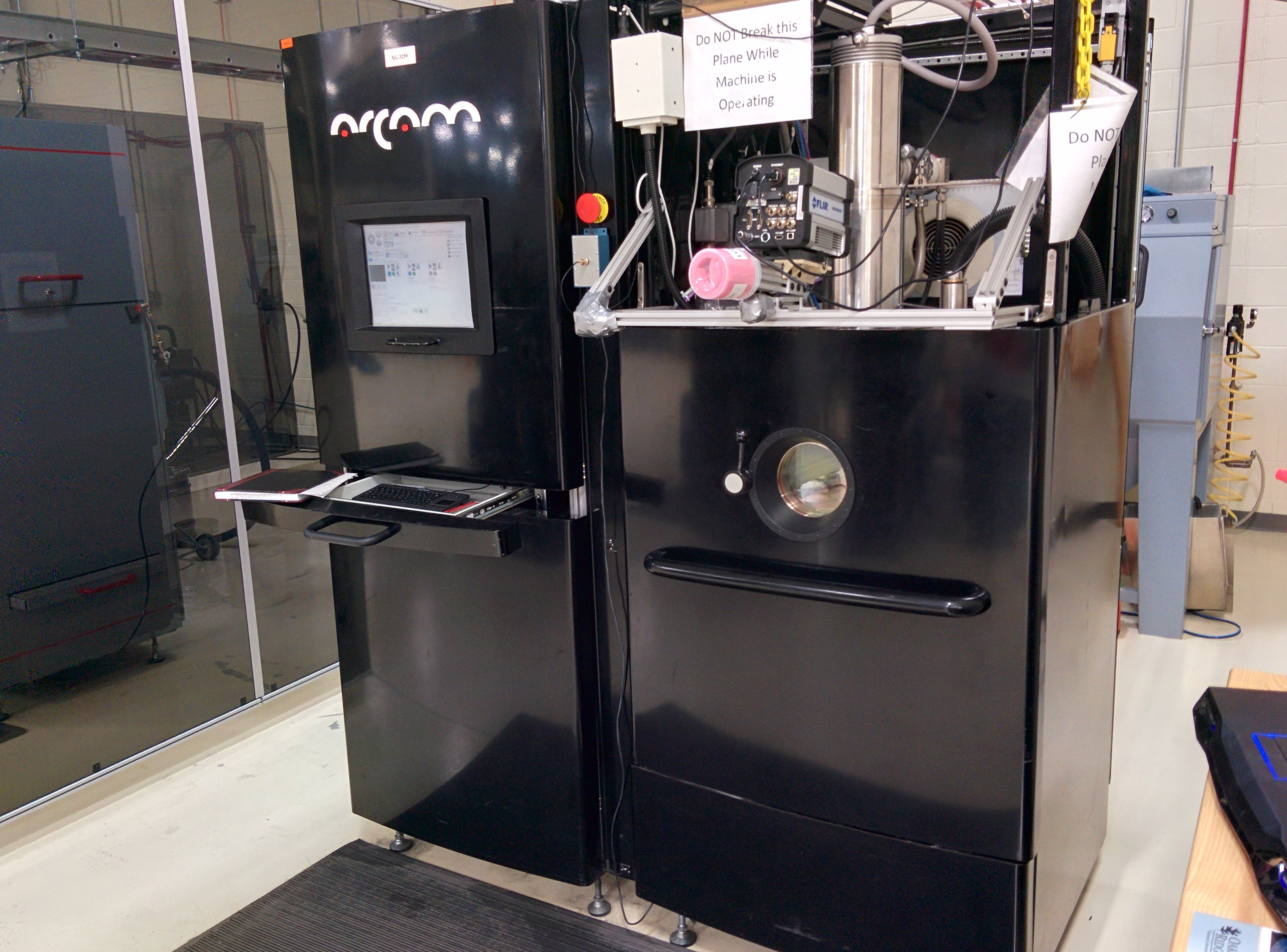
Arcam A2

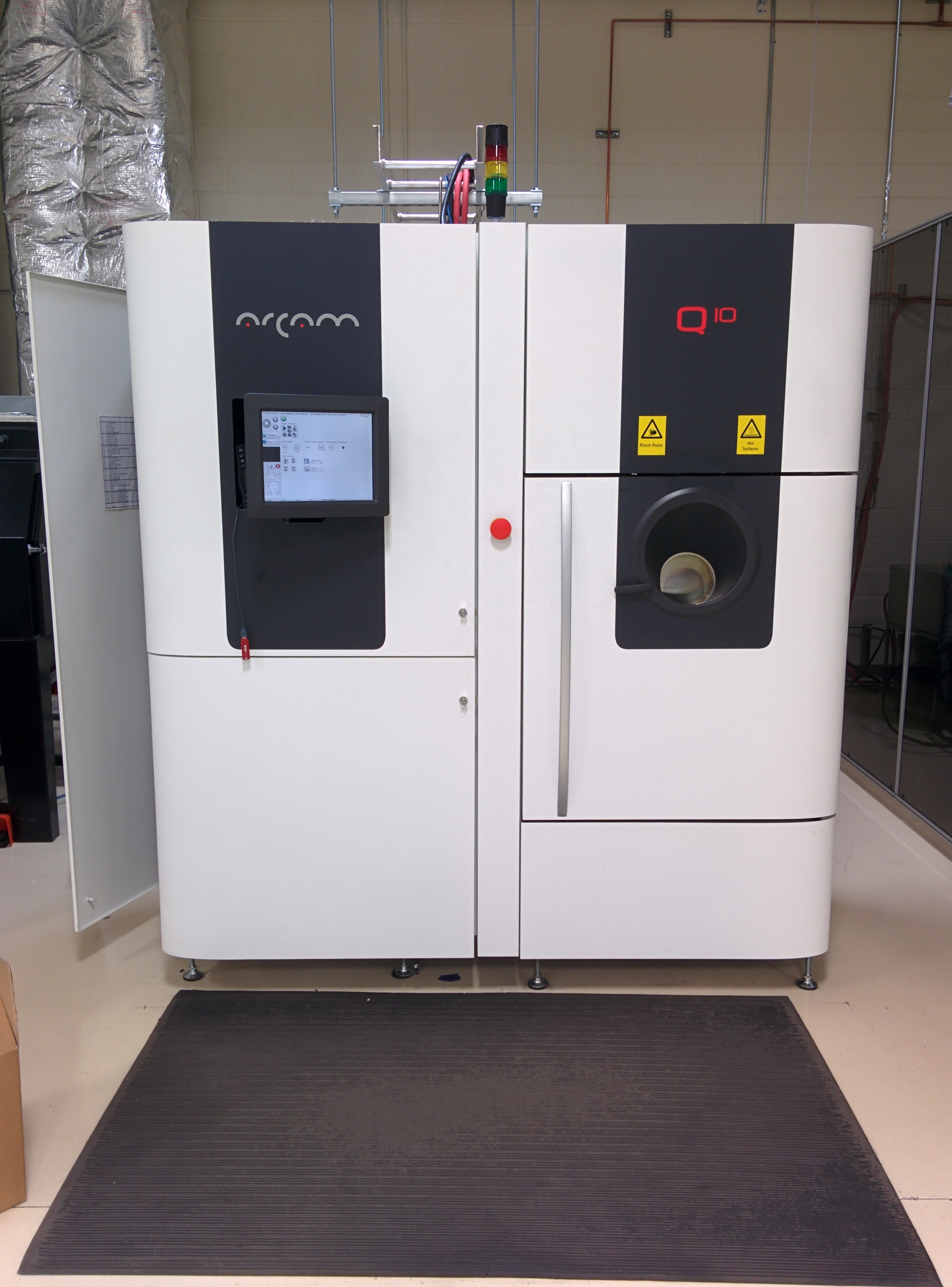
Arcam Q10

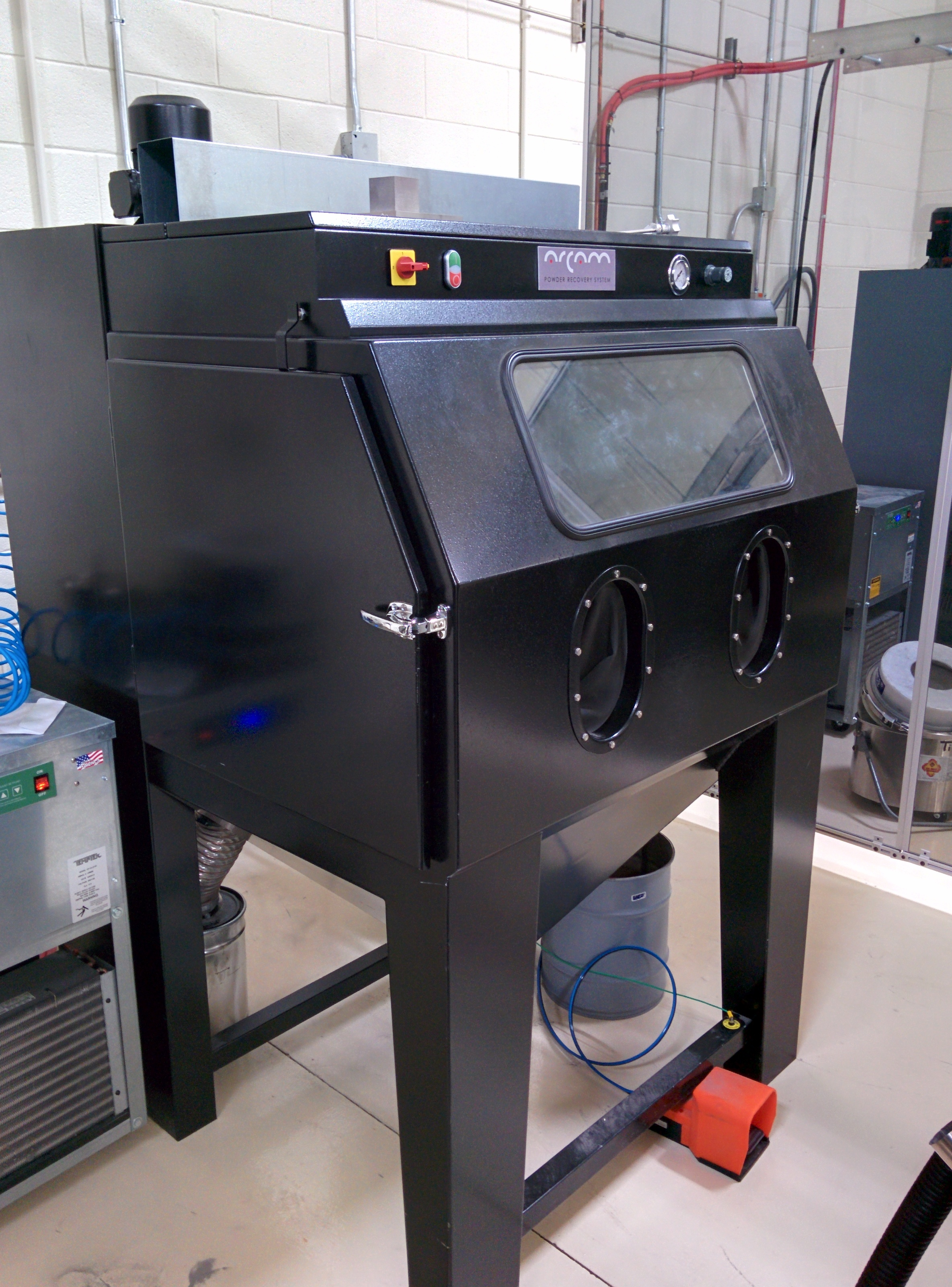
Metal powder recovery system

=== Research developments ===
Recent work has been published by ORNL, demonstrating the use of EBM technology to control local crystallographic grain orientations in Inconel. After testing in the transmission electron microscope by the state-of-the-art in-situ technique, the EBM Inconel alloy has been proved to exhibit similar mechanical property comparing to a wrought Inconel alloy. Numerous investigations have been conducted in recent times, exploring the microstructure and characteristics of various steel grades (including austenitic, martensitic, dual-phase, and ferritic) tailored for EBM process. Other notable developments have focused on the development of process parameters to produce parts out of alloys such as copper, niobium, Al 2024, bulk metallic glass, stainless steel, and titanium aluminide. Currently commercial materials for EBM include commercially pure Titanium, Ti-6Al-4V, CoCr, Inconel 718, and Inconel 625.

== Metal wire-based systems ==
Another approach is to use an electron beam to melt welding wire onto a surface to build up a part. This is similar to the common 3D printing process of fused deposition modeling, but with metal, rather than plastics. With this process, an electron-beam gun provides the energy source used for melting metallic feedstock, which is typically wire. The electron beam is a highly efficient power source that can be both precisely focused and deflected using electromagnetic coils at rates well into thousands of hertz. Typical electron-beam welding systems have high power availability, with 30- and 42-kilowatt systems being most common. A major advantage of using metallic components with electron beams is that the process is conducted within a high-vacuum environment of 1×10^{−4} torr or greater, providing a contamination-free work zone that does not require the use of additional inert gases commonly used with laser and arc-based processes. With EBDM, the feedstock material is fed into a molten pool created by the electron beam. Through the use of computer numeric controls (CNC), the molten pool is moved about on a substrate plate, adding material just where it is needed to produce the near net shape. This process is repeated in a layer-by-layer fashion until the desired 3D shape is produced.

Depending on the part being manufactured, deposition rates can range up to 200 cubic inches (3,300 cm^{3}) per hour. With a light alloy, such as titanium, this translates to a real-time deposition rate of 40 pounds (18 kg) per hour. A wide range of engineering alloys are compatible with the EBDM process and are readily available in the form of welding wire from an existing supply base. These include, but are not limited to, stainless steels, cobalt alloys, nickel alloys, copper nickel alloys, tantalum, titanium alloys, as well as many other high-value materials.

== Market ==
The EBM process has been developed for manufacturing parts in gamma titanium aluminide and is currently being developed by Avio S.p.A. and General Electric Aviation for the production of turbine blades in γ-TiAl for gas-turbine engines.

The first EBM machine in the United States is housed by the Department of Industrial and Systems Engineering at North Carolina State University.

== See also ==
- 3D printing
- Electron-beam technology
- Electron-beam welding
