= Robocasting =

3D printing technique

Robocasting (also known as robotic material extrusion) is an additive manufacturing technique analogous to Direct Ink Writing and other extrusion-based 3D-printing techniques in which a filament of a paste-like material is extruded from a small nozzle while the nozzle is moved across a platform. The object is thus built by printing the required shape layer by layer. The technique was first developed in the United States in 1996 as a method to allow geometrically complex ceramic green bodies to be produced by additive manufacturing. In robocasting, a 3D CAD model is divided up into layers in a similar manner to other additive manufacturing techniques. The material (typically a ceramic slurry) is then extruded through a small nozzle as the nozzle's position is controlled, drawing out the shape of each layer of the CAD model. The material exits the nozzle in a liquid-like state but retains its shape immediately, exploiting the rheological property of shear thinning. It is distinct from fused deposition modelling as it does not rely on the solidification or drying to retain its shape after extrusion.

== Process ==
Robocasting begins with a software process. One method is importing an STL file and slicing that shape into layers of similar thickness to the nozzle diameter. The part is produced by extruding a continuous filament of material in the shape required to fill the first layer. Next, either the stage is moved down or the nozzle is moved up and the next layer is deposited in the required pattern. This is repeated until the 3D part is complete. Numerically controlled mechanisms are typically used to move the nozzle in a calculated tool-path generated by a computer-aided manufacturing (CAM) software package. Stepper motors or servo motors are usually employed to move the nozzle with precision as fine as nanometers.

The part is typically very fragile and soft at this point. Drying, debinding and sintering usually follow to give the part the desired mechanical properties.

Depending on the material composition, printing speed and printing environment, robocasting can typically deal with moderate overhangs and large spanning regions many times the filament diameter in length, where the structure is unsupported from below. This allows intricate periodic 3D scaffolds to be printed with ease, a capability which is not possessed by other additive manufacturing techniques. These parts have shown extensive promise in fields of photonic crystals, bone transplants, catalyst supports, and filters. Furthermore, supporting structures can also be printed from a "fugitive material" which is easily removed. This allows almost any shape to be printed in any orientation.

== Mechanical behavior ==
One key advantage of the robocasting additive manufacturing technique is its ability to utilize a wide range of feedstock "inks," as shear-thinning ability is the only inherently required material property. As such, robocasting has seen diverse application among many disparate materials classes such as metallic foams, pre-ceramic polymers, and biological tissues. This allows for a wide range of mechanical characteristics to be accessible through this technique, with additional tailoring possible through the use of ink fillers and varying extrusion parameters.

=== Filler effects ===
Micro- and nano-scale filler materials are commonly used to create composite feedstocks for robocasting and are available in a wide range of compositions, with morphologies typically falling into the broad categories of spheres, platelets, and filaments/tubes. Both composition and morphology play significant roles in the mechanical characteristics imparted by the filler. For example, the inclusion of stiff boron nitride nanobarbs within epoxy feedstock has been demonstrated to anisotropically increase overall composite strength and stiffness along the direction of fiber orientation due to their shape asymmetry, while the inclusion of hollow glass microspheres within the same epoxy feedstock has been demonstrated to isotropically improve specific strength by significantly reducing total density of the composite.

In addition to shape, differing size regimes within fillers of the same morphology have been demonstrated to yield significant changes in mechanical properties. For epoxy-carbon fiber composite systems of identical composition, flexural strength has been shown to generally decrease with decreasing fiber length. However, shorter fibers have also been demonstrated to produce better overall printing behavior during the robocasting process as increasing length also increases the likelihood of jamming within the extruder; higher print fidelity as seen for the shorter fibers generally results in greater reproducibility of mechanical behavior. In addition, very long fibers have exhibited a tendency to break during extrusion, essentially imparting a de facto size cap on filament-type fillers used in robocasting.

=== Extrusion effects ===
Extrusion phenomena inherently tied into the robocasting technique have been shown to have appreciable effects on the mechanical behavior of resulting parts. One of the most significant is the alignment of filler materials within composite feedstocks during deposition, which is enhanced as filler anisotropy increases. This alignment phenomenon also becomes more pronounced with decreasing nozzle diameter and increasing ink deposition speed, as these factors increase the effective shearing experienced by fillers suspended within the feedstock in accordance with Jeffrey-Hamel flow theory. Fillers are thus driven to align parallel to the extrusion pathway, imparting significant anisotropic character within the finished part. This anisotropy can be further enhanced by prescribing extrusion pathways that remain parallel throughout the manufacturing process; conversely, prescribing extrusion pathways that exhibit differing orientations, such as 90° "logpile" rotation between layers, can mitigate this effect.

Selection of deposition pathing can also be exploited to alter mechanical characteristics of robocasting products, such as in the case of non-dense and graded components. The creation of open lattice-type structures via robocasting is widespread and enables optimization of specific strength and stiffness by reducing the cross-sectional footprint of a given feedstock material while retaining much of its bulk mechanical integrity. In addition, the creation of unique deposition pathing via finite element analysis of a desired structure can generate dynamically-graded geometries optimized for specific applications.

== Applications ==
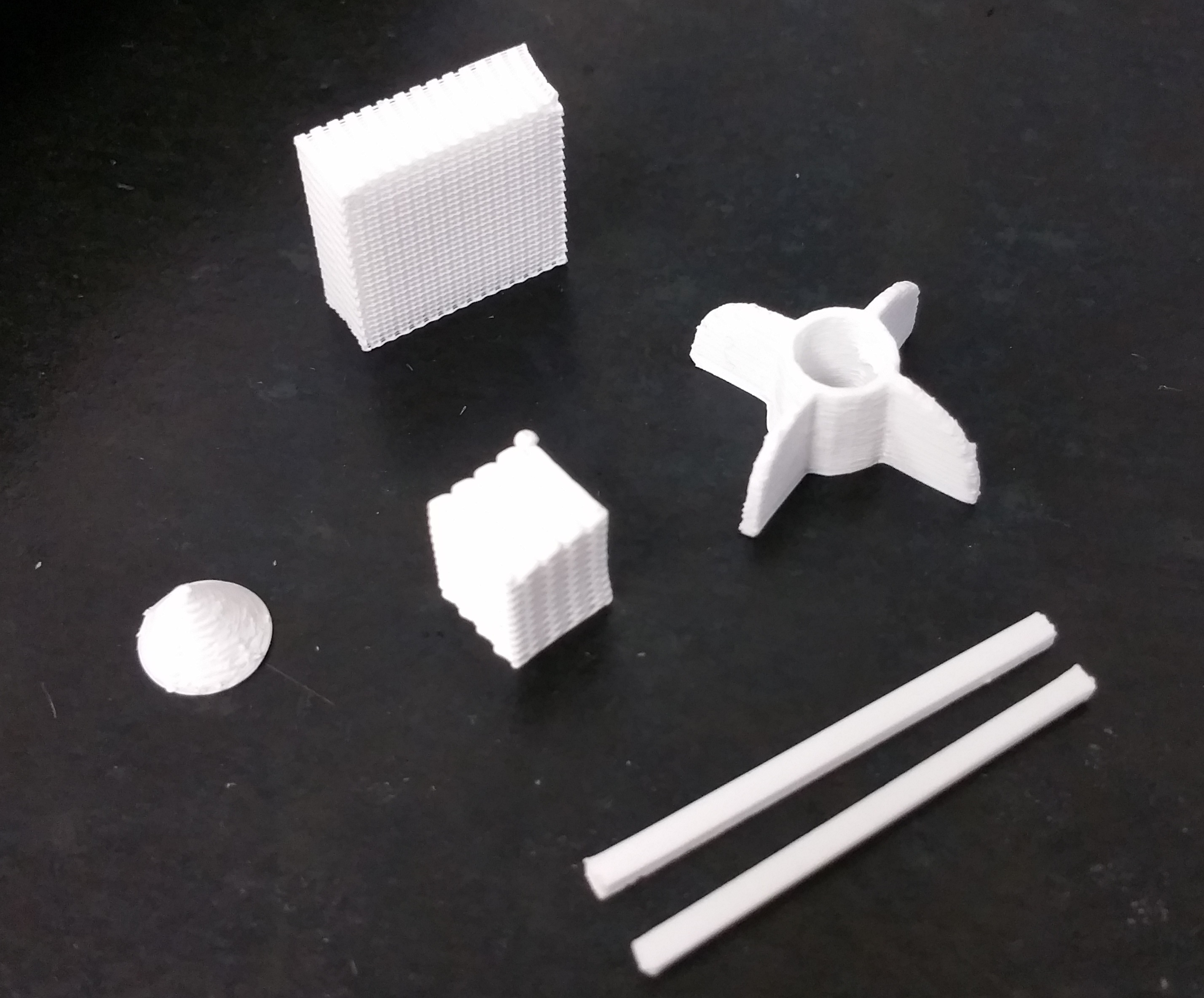
An array of simple alumina geometries created by robocasting.

The technique can produce non-dense ceramic bodies which can be fragile and must be sintered before they can be used for most applications, analogous to a wet clay ceramic pot before being fired. A wide variety of different geometries can be formed from the technique, from solid monolithic parts to intricate microscale "scaffolds", and tailored composite materials. A heavily-researched application for robocasting is in the production of biologically compatible tissue implants. "Woodpile" stacked lattice structures can be formed quite easily which allow bone and other tissues in the human body to grow and eventually replace the transplant. With various medical scanning techniques the precise shape of the missing tissue was established and input into 3D modelling software and printed. Calcium phosphate glasses and hydroxyapatite have been extensively explored as candidate materials due to their biocompatibility and structural similarity to bone. Other potential applications include the production of specific high surface area structures, such as catalyst beds or fuel cell electrolytes. Advanced metal matrix- and ceramic matrix- load bearing composites can be formed by infiltrating woodpile bodies with molten glasses, alloys or slurries.

Robocasting has also been used to deposit polymer and sol-gel inks through much finer nozzle diameters (less than 2 μm) than is possible with ceramic inks.
