= Ultrasonic consolidation =

Ultrasonic Consolidation (UC) or Ultrasonic Additive Manufacturing (UAM) is a low temperature additive manufacturing or 3D printing technique for metals.

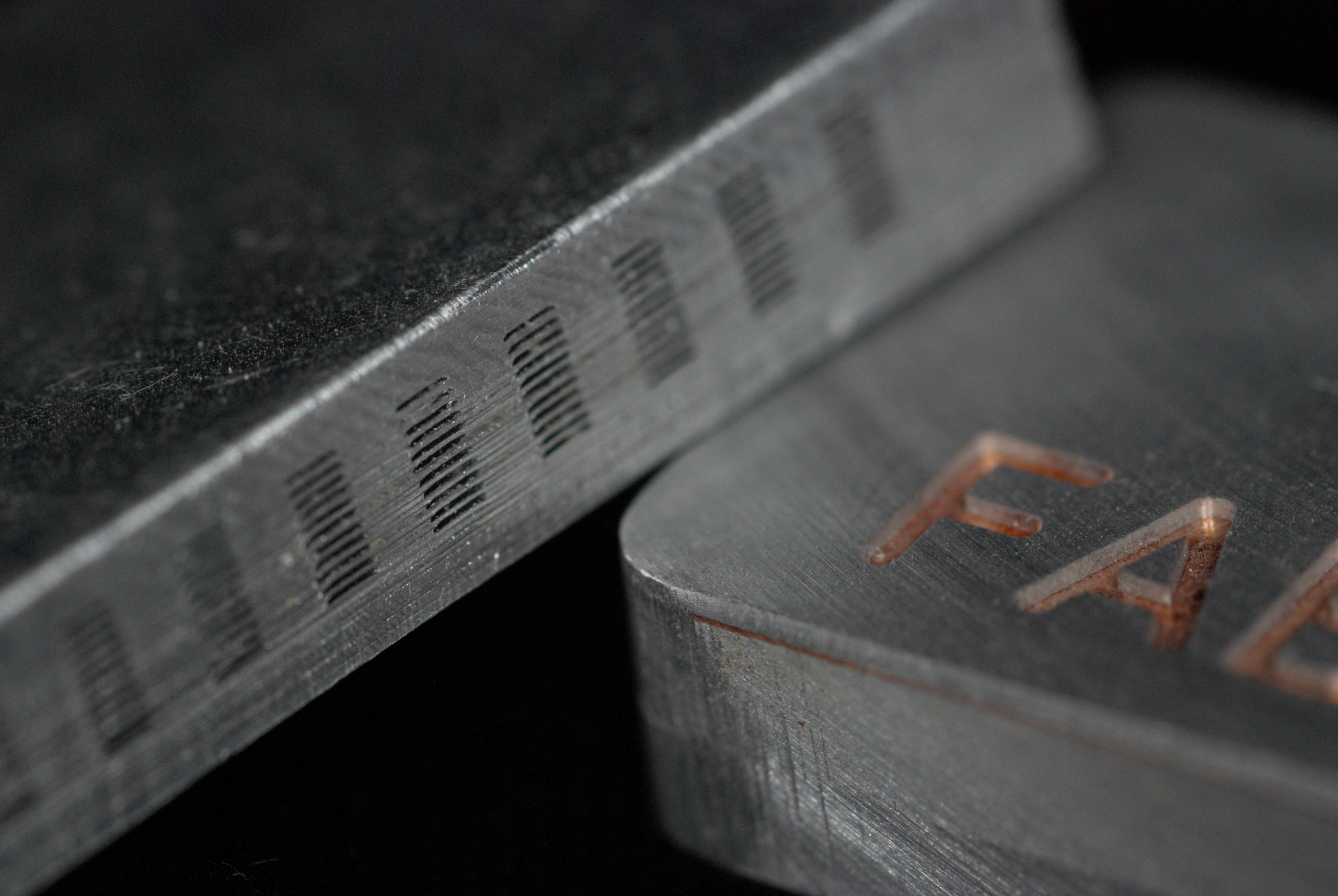
UAM part examples: Micro heat exchanger and dissimilar metal part with aluminum and copper.

The process works by scrubbing metal foils together with ultrasonic vibrations under pressure in a continuous fashion, i.e., sheet lamination classification in additive manufacturing. Melting is not the formation mechanism. Instead, metals are joined in the solid-state via disruption of surface oxide films between the metals, i.e. ultrasonic metal welding mechanisms. CNC contour milling is used interchangeably with the additive stage of the process to introduce internal features and add detail to the metal part. UAM has the ability to join multiple metal types together, i.e., dissimilar metal joining, with no or minimal intermetallic formation and allows the embedment of temperature sensitive materials at relatively low temperature—typically less than 50% of the metal matrix melting temperature.

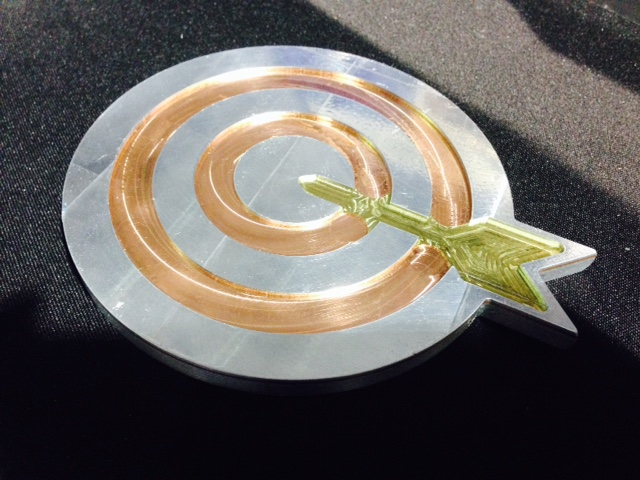
Joining of multi-metals into a single part. Metals are copper, brass, and aluminum.

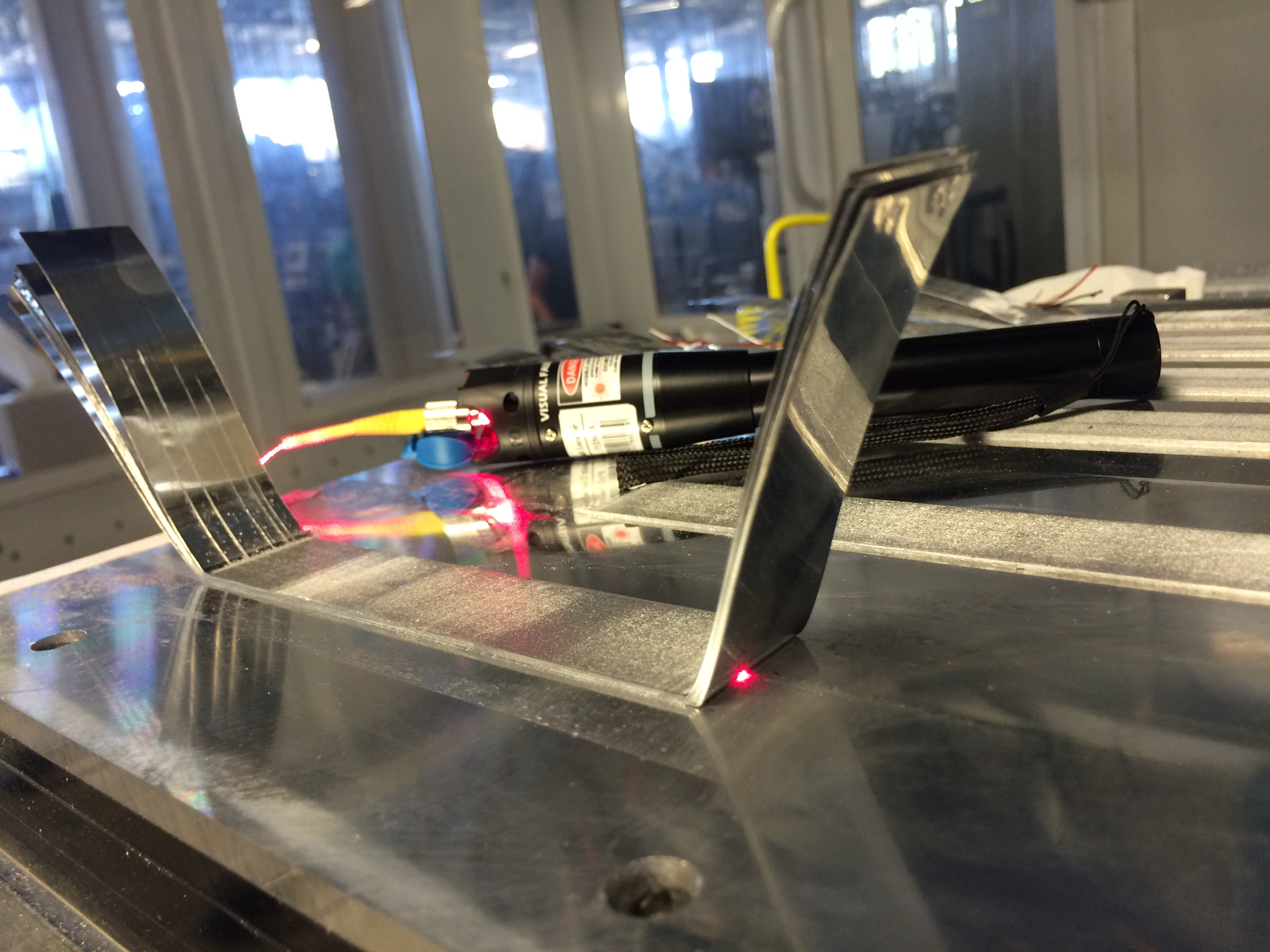
Embedding a temperature sensitive fiber optic cable.

== History ==
The Ultrasonic Consolidation or Ultrasonic Additive Manufacturing process was invented and patented by Dawn White. In 1999, White founded Solidica Inc. to sell commercial UAM equipment—Form-ation machine suite. Near 2007, the Edison Welding Institute (EWI) and Solidica began a collaboration to re-design the weld tooling to remedy bond quality limitations and to expand the weldable metals of the process—so called very high power UAM. In 2011, Fabrisonic LLC was formed to commercialize the improved UAM process—SonicLayer machine suite. A SonicLayer 4000 system was simultaneously deployed at the Ohio State University.

== Process ==
As with most other additive manufacturing processes UC creates objects directly from a CAD model of the required object. The file is then "sliced" into layers which results in the production of a cnc gcode file that can be used by the UC machine to build the required object, layer by layer.

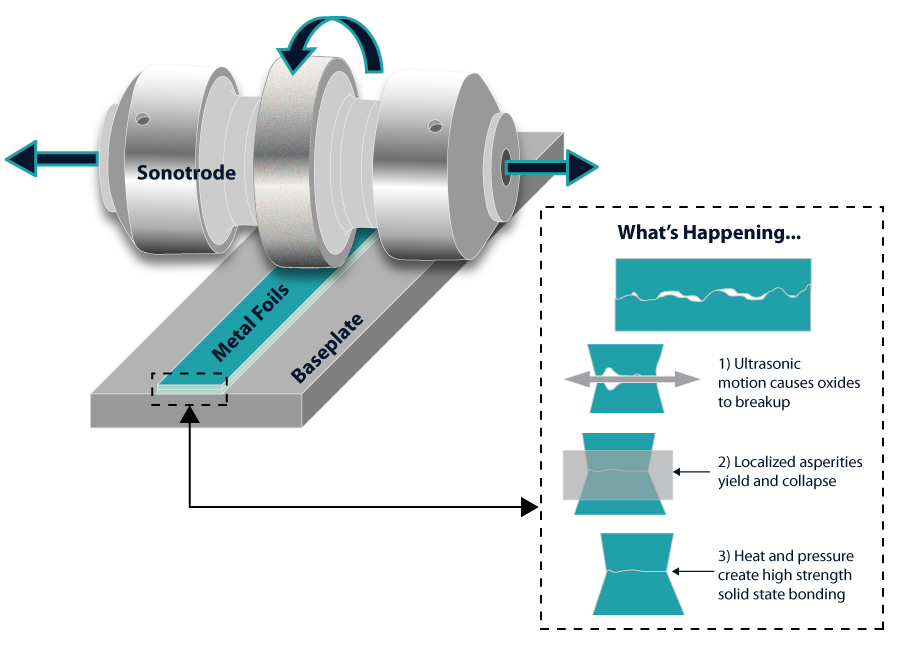
A schematic of the Ultrasonic Consolidation (UC) or Ultrasonic Additive Manufacturing (UAM) process.

The general manufacturing process is:

- A base plate is placed onto the machine anvil and fixed into place.
- Metal foil is then drawn under the sonotrode, which applies pressure through a normal force and the ultrasonic oscillations, and bonded to the plate.
- This process is then repeated until the required area has been covered in ultrasonically consolidated material.
- A CNC mill is then used to trim the excess foil from the component and achieve the required geometry.
- The deposit and trim cycle is repeated until a specified height is reached, (typically 3–6 mm).
- At this height a smaller finishing mill is used to create the required tolerance and surface finish of the part.
- The deposit, trim and finish cycle continues until the finished object has been manufactured; at which point it is taken off the anvil and the finished article is removed from the base plate.

Mechanism of the metallurgical bond formation between foils can be explained by microscopic deformation of micro-asperities on the top foil. The sonotrode surface is usually textured so as to facilitate the grip of the top foil subjected to vibrations. The resultant rough imprint on the top foil surface affects bonding of the subsequent layer. The contact area between the upper and lower foils expands when the micro-asperities are crushed by the ultrasonic oscillations.
