= Computed axial lithography =

Method for 3D printing

Computed axial lithography (CAL) is a method of 3D printing that is based on computerised tomography scans, whereby it creates objects from photo-curable resin. The process was developed by a collaboration between the University of California, Berkeley and the Lawrence Livermore National Laboratory. CAL is distinguished from, for example, the fused deposition modelling and stereolithography 3D-printing models, in that it does not build models by means of depositing consecutive layers of material; instead, it projects a set of 2D images of the intended 3D product, onto a cylinder of resin, while both the images and the resin spin at the same rate. CAL is also notable for its ability to build an object often in mere seconds—much more quickly than other methods using resins; moreover, it can simultaneously make multiple objects, one embedded inside another, within the same active process.
