= Liquid additive manufacturing =

3D printing technique

Liquid additive manufacturing (LAM) is an additive manufacturing technique which deposits a liquid or high viscosity material (e.g Liquid Silicone Rubber) onto a build surface to create an object which is then vulcanised using heat to harden the object. The process was originally created by Adrian Bowyer and was then built upon by the German company RepRap.
