= 3D printed prosthesis =

Artificial body part created using 3D printing

== 3D Printing of Prosthetic Devices ==
In the United States roughly 5.6 million people have limb differences. Prosthetic devices are known as artificial replacements for missing or deformed body parts. These devices typically restore mobility, daily-life function, and independence. Throughout history many prosthetic devices have been developed for a multitude of purposes, and the evolution of prosthetic devices has become extensive worldwide. Traditional prosthetic devices are often expensive to obtain, and many people in need do not get the devices they need to help them. There have been many initiatives researched to mitigate the access limitations for these devices. Three Dimensional Printing (3DP) has been explored as a newer technological method for more accessible and faster production of prosthetic devices.

=== Background on Prosthetic Devices ===
==== Population Need ====
In 2005, it was estimated that 1.6 million individuals have a limb deformity and approximately 540,000 of those individuals specifically sustain upper limb deformities. In the United States, more than 32500 pediatric patients have experienced major amputation, and approximately 2.3 million people exhibited limb deformities in 2019. In low and middle-income countries, where the leading cause of amputation is trauma, there was an estimated number of 57.7 million individuals with limb loss or deformity. Many individuals with limb deformities or amputations do not have reliable access to high-quality and functional prosthetic devices. This is often due to limited availability of prosthetists to support the number of patients in need.

==== History of Prosthetics ====
Prosthetic devices can be dated back to ancient Egyptian and Roman empires and have continued to develop rapidly. One of the most well known early-dated prosthetic devices was known as the Hanger Limb. It was a developed medical technology in the late 1800s by John Hanger, in reaction to the American Civil War. Hangar was the first amputee of the American Civil war, and his prosthetic leg invention was revolutionary to the history of prosthetic device innovation.

==== Traditional Prosthetic Challenges ====
Traditional prosthetic devices are often expensive and time-consuming to produce. This can create barriers for many patients in-need, notably when those patients have limited access to medical specialists and are in need of frequent adjustments or replacements. Other barriers can include geographic location, limitations in medical resources, insurance coverage, and the cost of follow-up care.

Traditional prosthetic device production often involves thorough analysis of a patient's anatomical configuration, manual socket fabrication, mold modifications, and repeated fitting adjustments. These processes are time-consuming and can increase costs for both the patients, clinicians, and healthcare systems. Traditional socket fabrication can be difficult to reproduce when a patient needs alterations. This is because prosthetic sockets are highly individualized and molds are not often kept after production, leading to the entire process having to be reproduced.

It is also noted that many individuals that have experienced limb loss or limb deformity have adapted to life without their limb, and do not actively seek prosthetic use.

==== Recent Development of Prosthetics ====
Throughout time, prosthetic devices have rapidly changed. They have evolved from wooden and iron tools to multi-materialed, lightweight, tech-driven machines. Processes for creating these prosthetics have also expanded. Traditional prosthetics include various molding and fitting processes and utilise different plastic and metal materials. More recently, 3D printing has been utilized for creating medical devices. 3DP devices often incorporate carbon fiber, other plastics and bionics.

One of the first notable 3DP prosthetic devices created was called the Robohand, developed for a 5-year-old boy, Liam, born with missing fingers on his right hand. This was developed by Richard Van and Ivan Owen who collaborated with Makerbot to develop a 3-D printed bionic design. After Liam's success using their creation they uploaded the design for this device on Thingiverse which allowed this to become widely available to those in need of a functional prosthetic hand

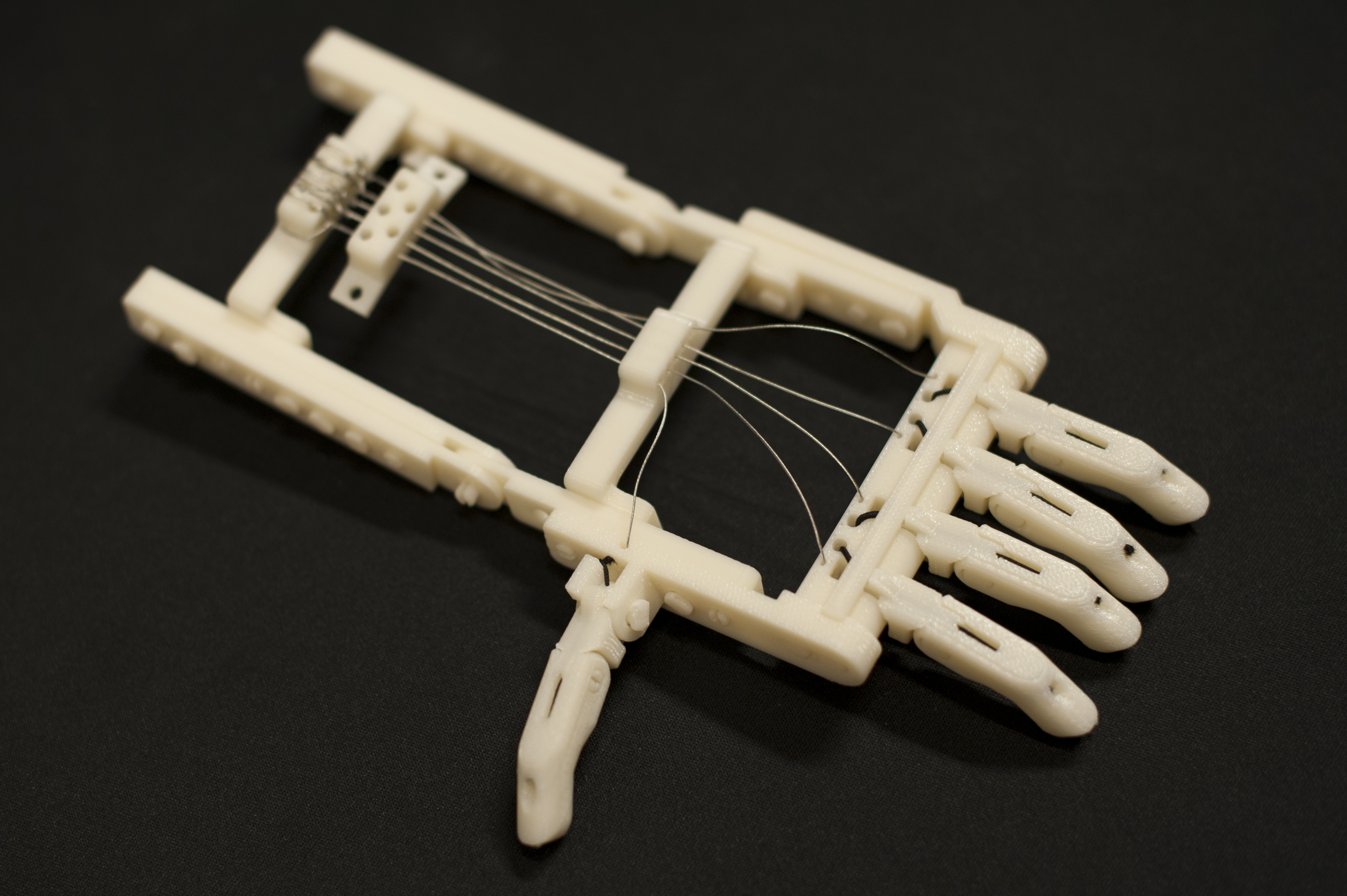
Robohand available on Thingiverse as an opensource 3D printable prosthesis

After working together, creating a mechanical body powered prosthetic for Van As, they realized that there was potential in use of a 3D printer for faster redesign. Eventually they created a 3D printed version, "Robohand", in which they posted on Thingiverse along with instructions on construction.

=== 3DP in Prosthetic Design ===
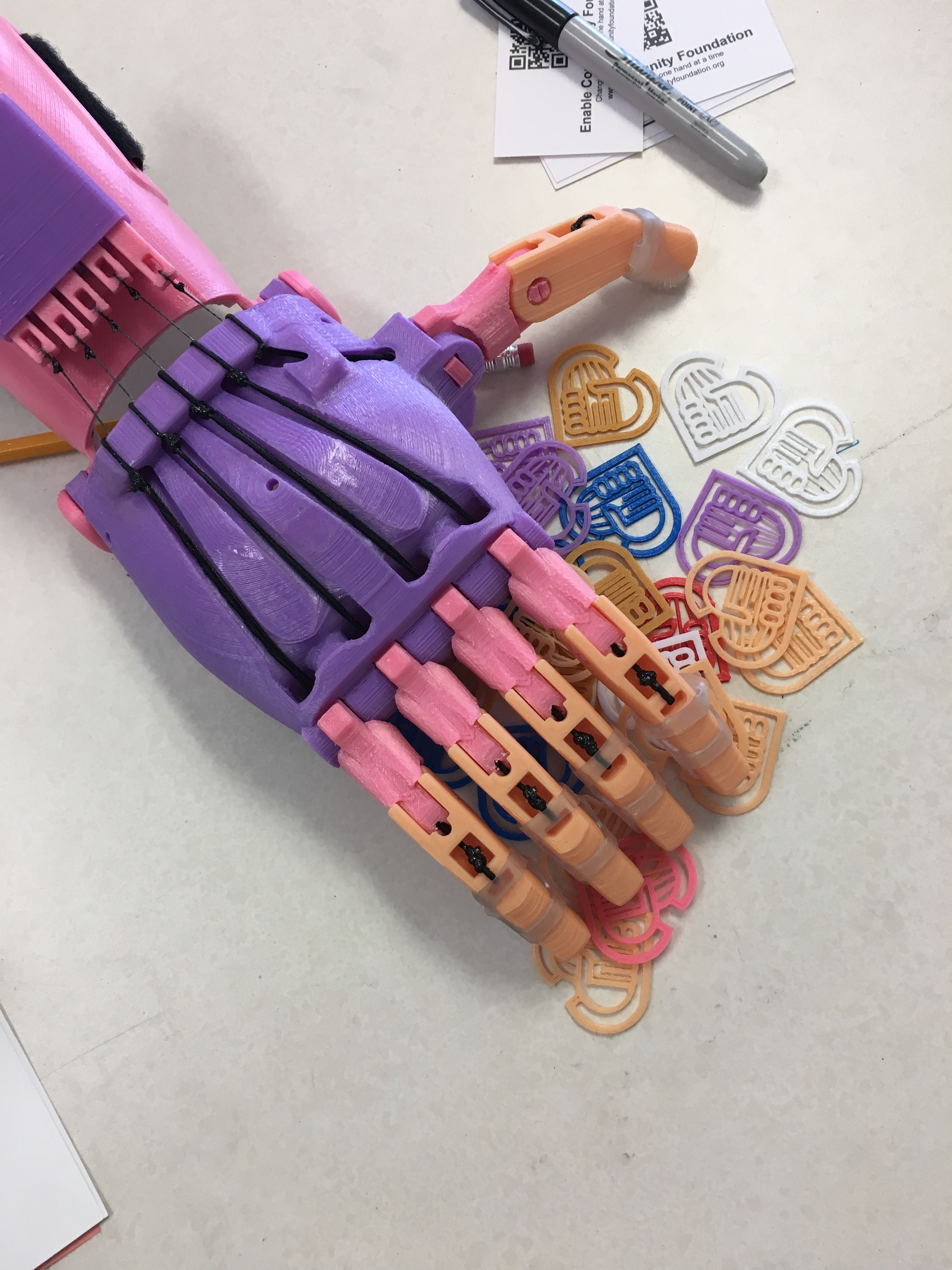
3D Printed body power prosthetic devise showing some available aesthetic customizations

3DP technology is an additive method of manufacturing, building physical three-dimensional objects from digital designs by adding layers of materials, such as varying plastics. 3DP has a wide range of materials accessible for production, like thermoplastics, elastomers, and composite material. 3DP prosthetic design evolved through the facilitation of computed tomography (CT) imaging and magnetic resonance imaging (MRI) The design starts with creating an accurate 3D rendering of the residual limb. This can be done in a few ways, such as 3D scanning, MRI, CT scan, or digital image reconstruction. A prosthesis can then be designed by integrating the rendering into an existing design. Depending on the design, different 3D printing manufacturing methods can be used. After printing, post processing occurs, some processes like SLA require the curing of the part, others like FDM require light clean up. Additional hardware, from support rods to bolts or wire is then added before the final assembly.

Models can be either positive space models, which replicate the patient's actual anatomy, or negative space models, which replicate the space surrounding the anatomy. 3DP can be inexpensive, less time-consuming to produce, and more controllable than traditional production techniques 3D printing allows for rapid prototyping, which has shown benefits within clinical settings. This is especially important within custom sockets. The socket is the main interface between a user and the prosthesis. Proper fitting is important for both comfort as well as allowing for proper function. Control of the prosthetic, as well as force distribution is primary control through the socket. The rapid prototyping enabled by 3D printing allows for this to be better honed in ensuring a better fit.

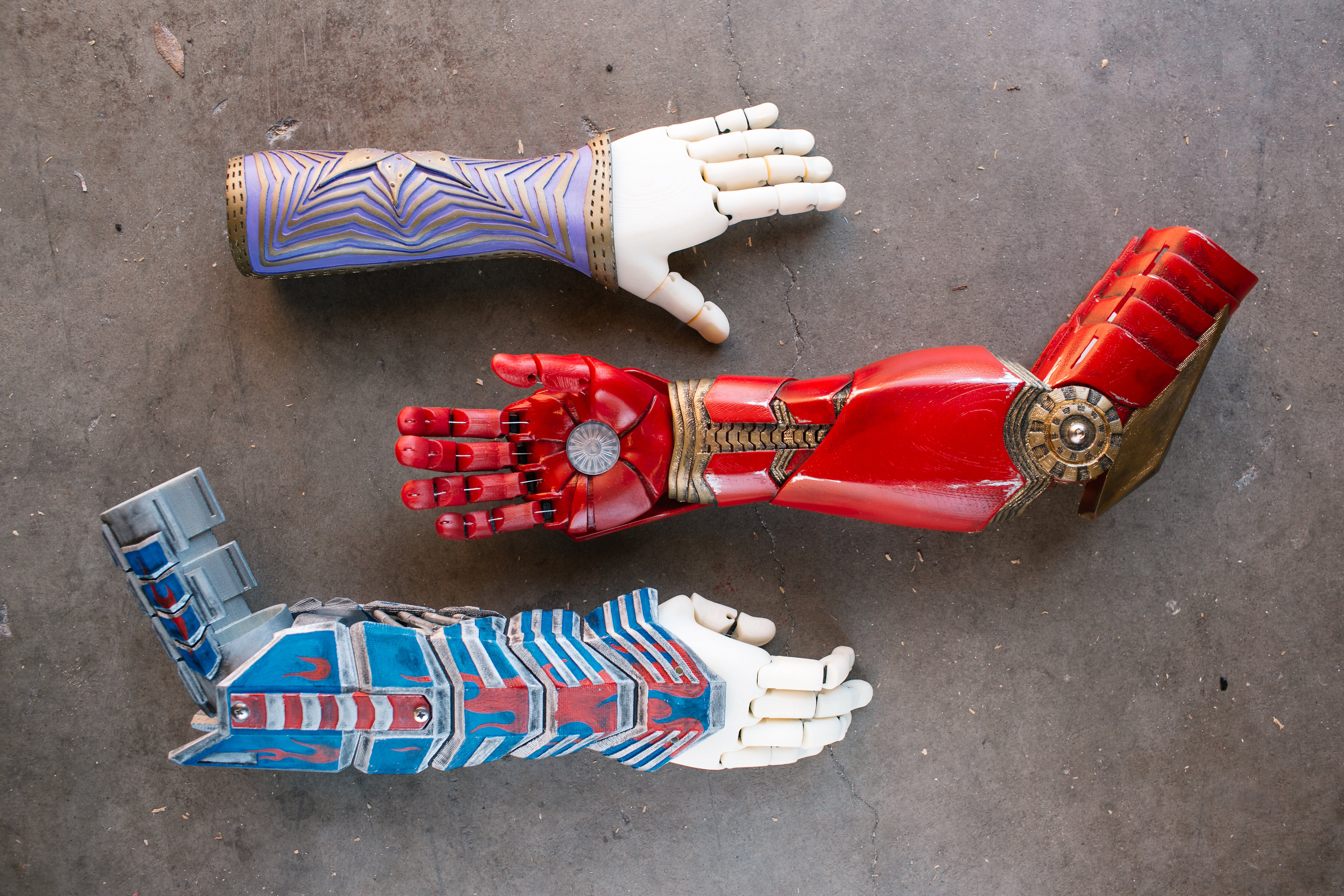
Limbitless Solution bionic arms

Aesthetic customizations are also more available with 3D printed prosthesis. Aesthetics along with involvement within the design of a prosthesis both have shown improvements of individuals self esteem. In turn, this leads to better reception of an individual for a prosthetic. For at home, or open source designs, this can come in the choice of various colors and sometimes even various textures and designs. Projects like Limbitless Solutions, a non profit which focus on prosthetics for children, have interactive websites allowing for individuals to create a custom design of their prosthesis like adding their own multi color designs. Additionally, they have also worked with artists and designers to create custom designs that children can choose.

==== Upper Limb Prostheses ====
Upper limb prostheses primarily support fine and gross motor skills. These prosthetics can support grip and dexterity. Upper limb prosthetic usage rates range from 37% to 56%. Lower usage for upper limb prosthetics are often due to aesthetics, weight, and costs. 3DP can provide enhancements in motor function and participation in daily activities however, durability and fine motor-skills remain barriers for clinical adoption.

==== Lower Limb Prostheses ====
Lower limb prostheses are critical to mobility, gait, balance, and weight bearing. Lower limb prosthetic usage rates range from 49% to 95%, and are often deemed more necessary. Lower limb prosthetics are often deemed more necessary for daily functioning.

3DP allows for custom sizing specific to the user, including precise tailoring and interactions along with rapid production processes . Prosthetics can support both upper and lower limb deformities, both of which are critical to a patient's quality of life and independence.

==== Open source design ====
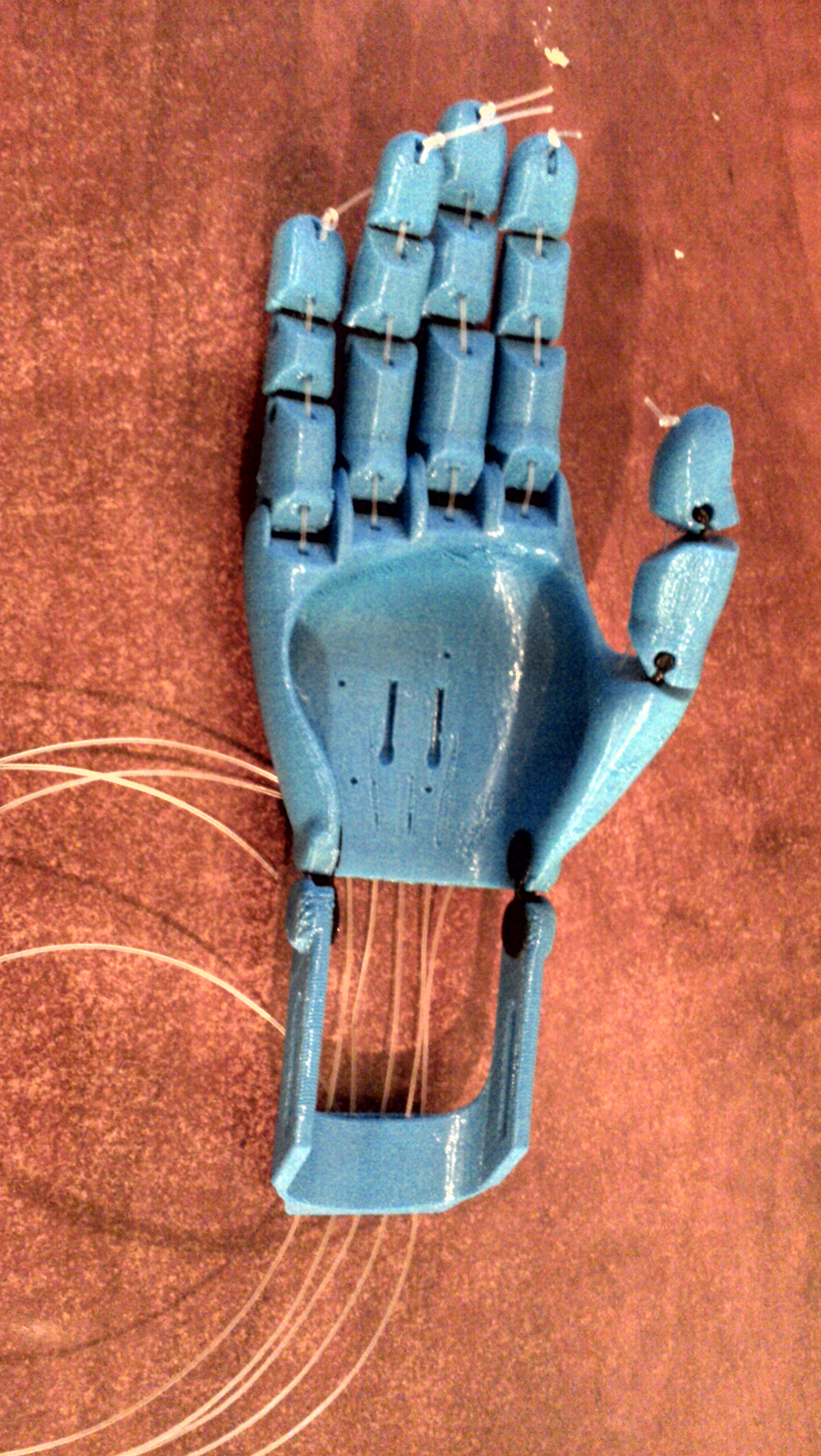
Opensource 3D printed body powered prosthetic devise

Open sourced designs for prosthesis allow for an especially low cost alternative. Built from collaborative efforts of various people, open source designs can have a wide range. Projects like Enable have walk through guides on building and assembly, along with a community out-reach program connecting people looking to get a prosthetic with a volunteer that can build it for them. Other projects like Cyborg beast work on creating specialized prosthesis devise for kids. Some projects, have various options that people can choose from depending on the level of limb difference as well as the general size. Other programs allow individuals to input custom parameters for tailoring and getting an individualized fit.

One drawback of open source designs is while 3D printing and design is very accessible, it does not mean that everyone can receive the same results. When prosthetics are designed with considerations of forces, and material properties, they are able to be optimized, allowing for more successful prosthetics. Additionally, experienced designers are better able to follow FDA guidelines which is important within the medical field. It is also worth noting that standardizations within testing allow for a more comprehensive comparison along with better characterization of the devise. Often projects will only consider the weight, printing speed, or cost of the devise rather than mechanical properties.

Work on solving these issues is being done, like at Carnegie Mellon University, in which Lee et al. researches the use of machine learning to characterize the mechanical properties of 3D printed parts. Their process allows for individuals to use a smart phone to take multiple photos of a residual limb, then digital image reconstruction allows for 3D mesh to be created. The 3D rendering is then implemented into a prosthesis devise using pre-designed assembly where possible. This allows for a better understand of material properties based on previous testing.

=== 3DP on Device Accessibility ===
Patient accessibility within prosthetics can be acknowledged through four major factors: affordability, usability, availability, and customization. Cost is the most significant barrier because production, clinical appointments, fittings and replacements can be very expensive. Cost is especially limiting if patients do not have sufficient insurance coverage. Availability is another consideration as many hospitals might only have select medical devices available, especially depending on geographic area and their resources. 3DP devices must also be usable in everyday life, provide comfort, and be easy for patients to operate. Customization considers if the device can accommodate and adapt to the patient's specific needs.

3DP may expand access for patients in need of prosthetic devices. The process for 3DP production itself may reduce the overall cost because digital designs can be modified more quickly than traditional. In consideration to pediatrics, many pediatric patients experience rapidly developing anatomy and they may need more frequent adjustments or replacements. 3DP may allow for these patients to get rapid prototyping for device reconstruction to accommodate changing anatomical or functional needs at a much lower cost.

The emergence of 3DP technology enables a level of customization by printing directly to the patient's unique anatomy. However, accessibility also depends on if patients can gain access to clinical care for adjustments and specifications. McKinsey Health Institute observed that patients with disabilities are more than twice as likely to skip or delay care due to cost. They are also more than twice as likely to have difficulty obtaining transportation to appointments. Affordability and access to care continue to be limitations even when new devices are available. In lower resource areas 3DP has been researched as a way to reduce dependence on expensive materials and manufacturing processes.

=== Patient-Centered Benefits ===
==== Adaptive Sport Attachments ====
3DP can offer benefits such as reduced cost, faster production, and customizable design with lightweight materials. 3DP offers the opportunity to create devices for adaptive sports. This technology offers the ability to create prosthetic adaptations like running or cycling attachments. This has the ability to allow patients to have differing attachments or multiple prostheses for daily functions[16]. Activity specific prosthesis adaptations may allow children to participate in recreational activities that daily-use prostheses might not support. Running and cycling adaptations are the most commonly researched adaptations, however their performance and design should be investigated further.

==== Pediatric Patients Impact ====
Prosthetics for children are often complex due to their growth rates and development. Devices supporting both cosmetic form and user function are not often accessible to children due to high costs, insurance, medical availability, and the devices durability and overall function. 3DP's ability of rapid production, customization and tailoring has the opportunity to make adjustments and redesign easier and more affordable for pediatric patients.

==== Psychosocial and Psychoemotional Impacts ====
Individuals with limb differences commonly experience various psychosocial and psychoemotional effects, such as lower self-esteem and a higher care for perception of their body image. The use of prosthetics devices can improve social involvement and the individual's confidence. 3DP has the opportunity to make devices more accessible to those in need, which in turn has the ability to benefit individuals' psycho-emotional health. 3DP's ability for customization also provides an opportunity for individuals to become expressive, gain confidence, and positive body image. Access to devices has a significant effect on the patient's psychosocial development. When patients are able to access a device that helps re-enable a daily-life function, it can help them regain a sense of normalcy in their everyday lives and function. However, more in-depth research is necessary to determine the effects and considerations for these demographics.

=== Limitations within 3DP Technology ===
==== Clinical Impact ====
However, despite the possible benefits of this technology, limitations can be observed. There is little standardization of 3DP prosthetics despite the rapid expansion of this technology. There is a need for regulation within production processes to ensure safety and credibility of these devices. Clinical adoption of 3DP prostheses remains limited due to production in non-regulated settings, and concerns regarding safety, durability, and lack of technical evidence and experimentation.

Mechanical performance can vary depending on the printing method, material, and design. Due to this durability, functionality, and material limitations remain important for investigation. Limitations within clinical reliability are also noticed. Many researchers noted studies relating 3DP prosthetics to be rated only as “fair” or “good”, and therefore need to be considered carefully. Most studies on 3DP devices are small in scale and lack thorough testing and trials. Studies have been limited in scope, indicating a need for additional research. Additional, in depth patient-centered research and clinical trials that focus on functional outcomes of these prosthetics are critical to determine the effectiveness of these devices for their push for clinical approval.

==== Material Limitations ====
With the rise in interest in 3DP of prosthetics, there has been an interest in material durability. Device durability and reliability is the main concern for 3DP device manufacturing. Material standards also influence the method through which the layers are printed for these devices. There is a risk for part vulnerabilities and failures, however optimization can be used to improve device reliability and performance. Designing devices utilizing realistic loading expectations is a beneficial adaptation of 3DP manufacturing, and can provide a greater certainty for device reliability. Shrinking of material is another concern for 3DP device production, which can be mitigated with careful consideration to measurement corrections. Another drawback is the limited available evidence regarding the durability of 3DP devices, because the resistance to clinical adaptation, there is little available experimentation and evidence regarding materials used in production. This introduces a difficulty regarding comparing 3DP material qualifications to traditional material qualifications.

==== Waste Production and Environmental Impact ====
Traditional prosthetic creation often involves subtractive methods, meaning they remove material during the production processes. However 3DP processes are typically built layer by layer, which reduces waste, and utilizes materials more efficiently. Through the reduction of waste in the design process, 3DP can allow for a major shift towards a more sustainable and environmentally conscious manufacturing practice. Synthesizing the supply chain for 3DP devices is also critical for the environmental impact of this process. Key factors for 3DP manufacturing include, material selection, product transportation, and the device development processes. Considerations of the energy consumption for material transformations is critical to environmental impact. 3DP provides the ability to greatly reduce production energy and labor in comparison to traditional manufacturing. However the 3DP processes require continuous use of energy, indicating the environmental impact heavily depends on the material used in production.

=== Current Research ===
There has been a recent focus of clinical adaptations within pediatrics. Pediatric patients are an important focus, because many of these patients have a higher need for frequent adjustments and repairs to their devices over time. Recent clinical applications of 3DP provide better treatment modalities for children. Researchers are also examining 3DP influence on differing attachments for adaptive sport, and how these devices can perform. Further research is needed to improve standardization, experimentation and testing, and clinical evaluation, despite the growing interest in 3DP device manufacturing.
