= 3D Manufacturing Format =

Open-source file format standard

- Filename extensions: .3mf
- Internet media type: application/vnd.ms-package.3dmanufacturing-3dmodel+xml, application/vnd.ms-printing.printticket+xml, model/3mf
- Developed by: 3MF Consortium
- Initial release: 29 April 2015; 11 years ago
- Latest release: 2.5.0; 24 February 2026; 7 months ago
- Container for: 3D printing data
- Contained by: Open Packaging Conventions
- Extended from: ZIP, XML
- Open format?: Yes
- Website: 3MF Specification

3D Manufacturing Format (3MF) is an open-source file format standard developed and published by the 3MF Consortium.

3MF is an XML-based data format designed specifically for additive manufacturing. It differs from other common additive manufacturing formats such as STL in that manufacturing features such as hotend and bed temperatures, feed rate, part regions using multiple materials, and support structures can all be embedded into the file in addition to the model data. This removes the need to share these parameters separately when distributing a design to be manufactured. 3MF is designed to be much simpler to implement than other CAD formats.

The 3MF Consortium consists of CAD software developers and related companies. When first created in 2015, the consortium included Autodesk, Dassault Systèmes, FIT AG, HP, Microsoft, Shapeways, and SLM. Additional additive manufacturing businesses, such as Materialise, 3D Systems, Siemens Digital Industries Software and Stratasys joined the consortium over time. In addition to publishing the main specification, the consortium also manages a C++ implementation of the 3MF file format.

In 2022 the 3MF format became part of the Linux open standards project. In 2025 it became ISO standard ISO/IEC 25422:2025.

== 3MF Consortium ==
As of June 2026, the 3MF Consortium has the following "Steering Members":

- 3D Systems
- Autodesk
- Dassault Systèmes
- EOS
- HP
- Materialise
- Microsoft
- nTopology
- PTC
- Siemens
- SLM
- Stratasys

== See also ==
- 3D printing marketplace
- FDM printing file formats
- Open XML Paper Specification
- X3D
- Additive Manufacturing File Format
- glTF File Format
