= Alain Le Mehaute =

French engineer-chemist and inventor (born 1947)

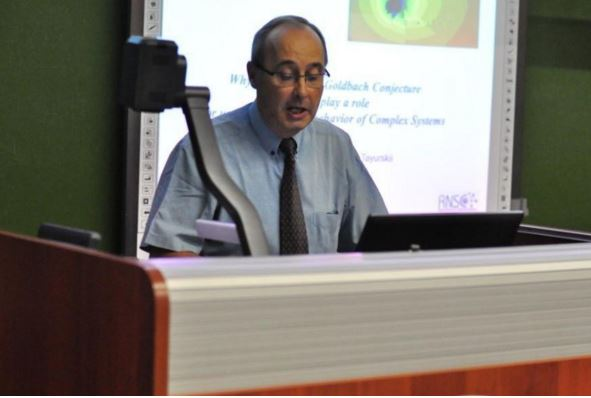
- Alain Le Mehaute gives a lecture.
- Born: November 22, 1947 (age 78); France
- Known for: Inventions and scientific research

Alain Le Mehaute (fr. Alain Le Méhauté; born November 22, 1947) is a French engineer-chemist and inventor. He has written numerous scientific researches and academic literature on Geometry, Physics and Chemistry. Alain Le Mehaute, Olivier de Witte and Jean Claude André were the first to file their patent for the stereolithography process, but officially the title of inventor of stereolithography and 3D printing technology on the whole belongs to Chuck Hull

== Career ==
From the start of his career (1974), Alain Le Méhauté (ESCIL/ECP engineer) was one of the main creative engineers in the Scientific Research Center of the industrial group Compagnie Générale d’Electricité (later named Alcatel-Alstrom 1991. With Jean Rouxel's team in Nantes University and in a partnership with Michel Armand he was one of the creators of lithium Batteries. At the same time, he held a position of visiting professor at University of Paris-Sud and during six years a position of associate research director at the CNRS (ENSIC Nancy). From 1996 to 2010 he was a director at the Institute for Advanced Materials and Mechanics, ISMANS, in Le Mans, there managing a research team of around twenty researchers in applied digital sciences and simulation. He then took the post as a visiting professor at the University of Kazan (Russia) after he had retired. He is Scientific Adviser of the CEO of Materials Design SARL and Inc especially for pedagogical applications.

Alongside his career as industrial engineer and manager, Alain le Méhauté has carried out a freelance scientist activity in mathematical physics which has led him to work very early (1975) in relation with Benoit Mandelbrot concerning applications of fractal geometries and with Pierre Gilles de Gennes in the eighties about the scaling issues of dynamical process in complex environment. These activities led him to give off the question of the industrial manufacturing of fractal materials and thus to imagine the early 3D Additive Layer Manufacturing machine (stereolithography) with his colleagues O. de Witte and J.C. André. Alain Le Mehaute has more than 200 articles published, most of them on physics but also on management of creativity. According to the United States Patent and Trademark Office Alain Le Méhauté is an author of 23 patents, including many in the development of lithium-based generator, electrodynamic filters, cables junctions, and devices for attenuating and filtering vibrations as the smart passive damping devices (SPADD, with ARTEC Aérospace)

== Invention of stereolithography ==
On July 16, 1984, Alain Le Méhauté, Olivier de Witte and Jean Claude André filed their patent for the stereolithography process.

It was three weeks before American Chuck Hull filed his own patent for stereolithography. Due to issues with the patent for Alain Le Méhauté, Olivier de Witte and Jean Claude André, Chuck Hall is considered to be the inventor of this technology. The application of French inventors were abandoned by the French General Electric Company (now Alcatel-Alsthom) and CILAS (The Laser Consortium). The claimed reason was “for lack of business perspective”.

One of the main sources about 3D printing 3dprint.com called him "the father of 3D printing".

Alain Le Méhauté in his interview describes the commitment that led to the patent application as arising from a theoretical commitment: mathematical order, a passion for transdisciplinary science, and the belief in the explosive commercial potential.

“At first, the team was flying high–until they learned (through second-hand rumors) that their patent application had been abandoned because their employers could not perceive the size of the commercial potential”.

Although Alain Le Méhauté expressed his regrets on the fact that the European Union awarded Chuck Hull as the sole inventor of this technology, he saluted Hull's work saying “I have great respect for Hull who had the courage to initiate the creation of 3D Systems in 1986. I also have a lot of admiration for the US’s ability to open doors to the future, even in cases where they can only understand theoretical approximations of the value. It’s something our French financial experts would laugh at doing, even today…We see the consequences of these attitudes every day and 3D technology is just one example of our collective failure”.
