= Simbionix =

Simbionix is a line of surgical simulators that are used in medical schools to simulate surgical procedures.

== Founding ==
Simbionix was founded in 1997 by Edna Chosack and David Barkay, that were joined by Ran Bronstein in 1998 with research and development based out of Israel. Today Simbionix is the name of a medical and surgical training simulation product line.

== Simulators ==
The company creates 3D virtual reality surgical simulators and medical education resources, used by medical students to learn how to perform medical procedures and surgeries. One of its first simulators was the GI Mentor for upper and lower gastroenterology procedures. In 2013 they released the ANGIO Mentor Suite for endovascular training. As of 2014 the company has designed simulators for sixty different interventional procedures within eight surgical specialties, on sixteen simulation platforms. That year the company released its Simbionix RobotiX Mentor for training on robotic surgery. In 2017 the company released its SPINE Mentor to help learners master minimally invasive spine surgery.

In 2014 Simbionix was acquired for $120 million by 3D Systems, a NYSE traded company, which continues to sell the Simbionix simulators. The simulators are updated over time to keep pace with changes in the medical industry. Simulations provide real-time feedback for the trainees. About three thousand simulators are in use globally.
