= Limbitless Solutions =

Non-profit printer of 3D prosthetics

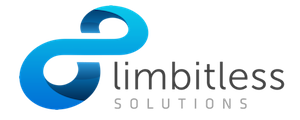
- Limbitless Solutions Logo
- Formation: 2014; 12 years ago
- Type: 501(c)(3) non-profit organization
- Purpose: Develop open source 3D printed bionic solutions for children that are functional, affordable, and easy to manufacture.
- Headquarters: Orlando, Florida, U.S.
- Website: limbitless-solutions.org

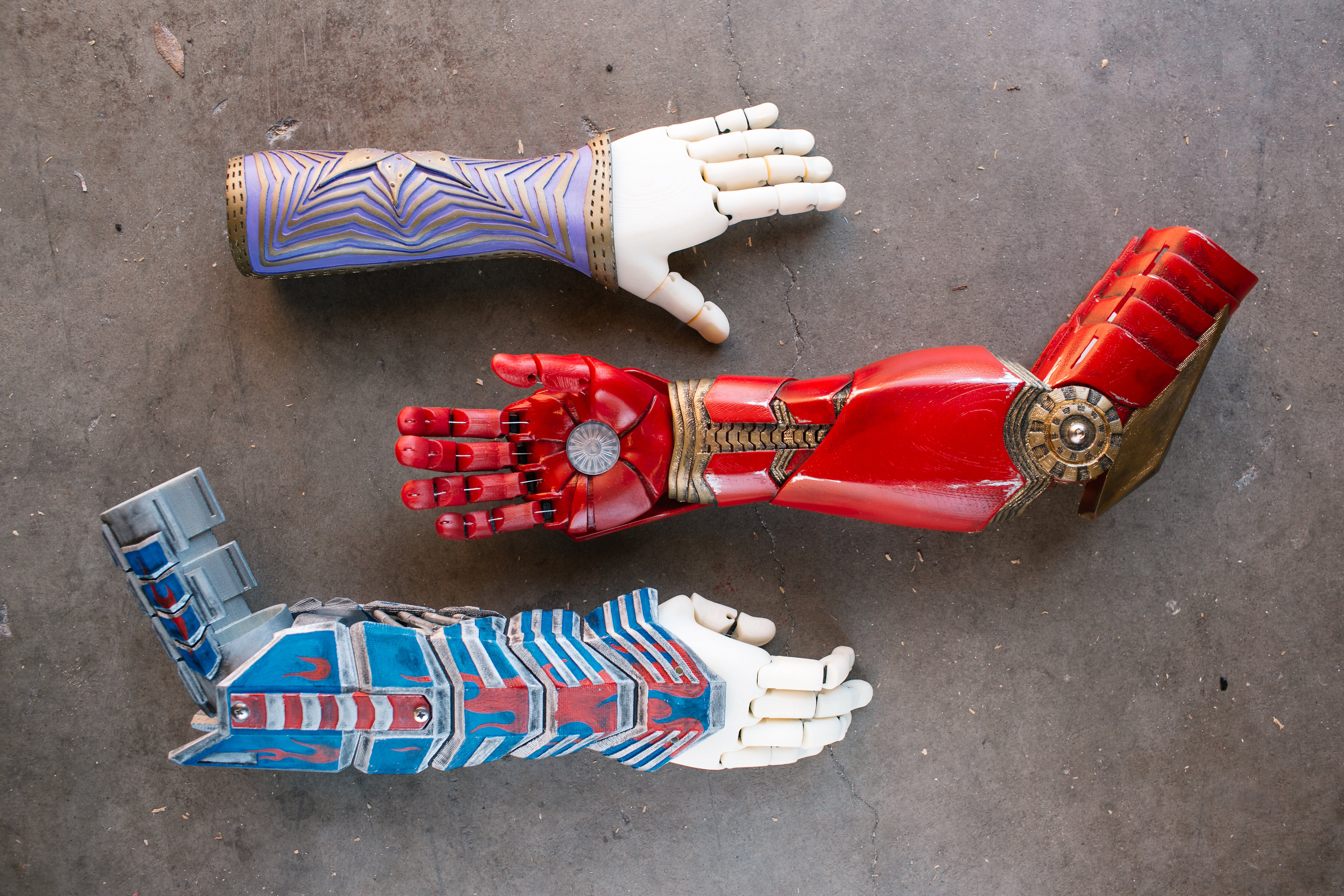
Limbitless Solutions, Bionic Arms

Limbitless Solutions is a 501(c)(3) non-profit organization founded in the United States that uses additive manufacturing (3D printing) to create accessible, yet affordable personalized bionics and prosthetic partial arms for children with limb differences. The organization says their bionic arms are manufactured for under $400, 1% of the standard production cost. Headquartered on the University of Central Florida campus in Orlando, Florida, the organization was founded by a team of engineering students, led by CEO and Executive Director Albert Manero.

== History ==
The idea of Limbitless Solutions came to life in 2014 after a team of engineering students at the University of Central Florida led an initiative to provide bionic 3D printed limbs to children. In their free time, the students took advantage of a donated Stratasys Dimension 3D printer in the engineering manufacturing lab on campus to create an affordable prosthetic that displayed their ideas of art and engineering all into one. Their method was the first of its kind and minimized the cost and time of traditional prosthetic manufacturing processes like CNC milling. The first 3D printed arm the students created was run with off-the-shelf servomechanisms and batteries which are activated by the electromyography muscle energy on the child's limb. Most prosthetic arms are mechanical, which presents a challenge for children without elbows because they have to open and close their mechanical prosthetic by bending their elbow. That led the Limbitless team to come up with the idea for an electronic arm with a muscle sensor that allows the child to open and close their prosthetic hand by flexing their biceps.

== Production ==
Before creating the bionic arm, the child is measured carefully to ensure that the length, width, and size of their new 3D prosthetic is as similar to their residual arm as possible. The model of the arm is then appropriately scaled and adjusted using Fusion 360 before being printed, assembled, and fitted. Electromyography (EMG) sensors are then calibrated before the arm is ready for use. The time to create one bionic arm varies depending on several factors, the most significant being the type of limb difference the child has.

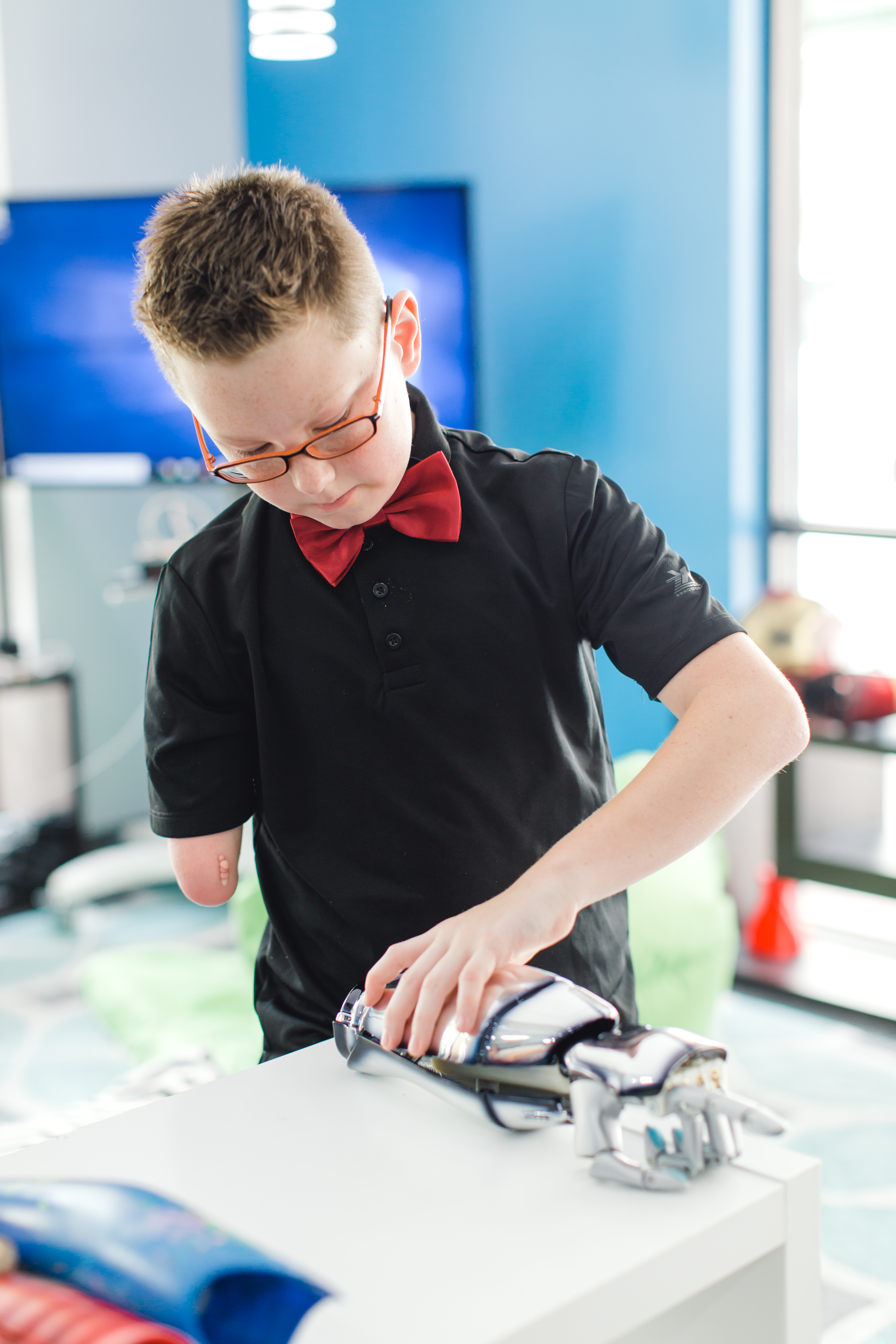
Limbitless Solutions. Orlando, Florida

=== Recipients ===
Children who have been given bionics from Limbitless Solutions include a 7-year-old boy who received a 3D printed Iron Man themed arm, presented by actor Robert Downey Jr. (facilitated by Microsoft's The Collective Project), a 12-year-old from Vero Beach, Florida, who was the recipient of a bionic arm presented by the Blue Man Group at Universal Studios in Orlando, Florida, an 11-year-old girl originally from California who was presented a floral themed arm at the Clearwater Marine Aquarium, an 8-year-old boy from Seattle, Washington, who received his arm as part of the 12 Arms of Christmas delivery, a 10-year-old girl from Texas who was the recipient of a UCF themed arm, presented by the UCF Cheerleading team and Knightro, the UCF mascot, and a 22-year old model from Hawaii who wore the arm she received on the runway.

=== Other Limbitless projects ===
==== Project Xavier ====
Project Xavier is the name for the production of a wheelchair that is controlled by the same EMG sensors as the 3-D printed arms. These EMG sensors are placed on the temporalis muscles, allowing for those with limited or no hand dexterity the ability to control the wheelchair by clenching their jaw in different ways. This wheelchair reduces the need for the user to be pushed around by someone, making tasks easier and less time-consuming for them. This increased independence enhances their quality of life immediately.

==== The Bionic Kid comic book series ====
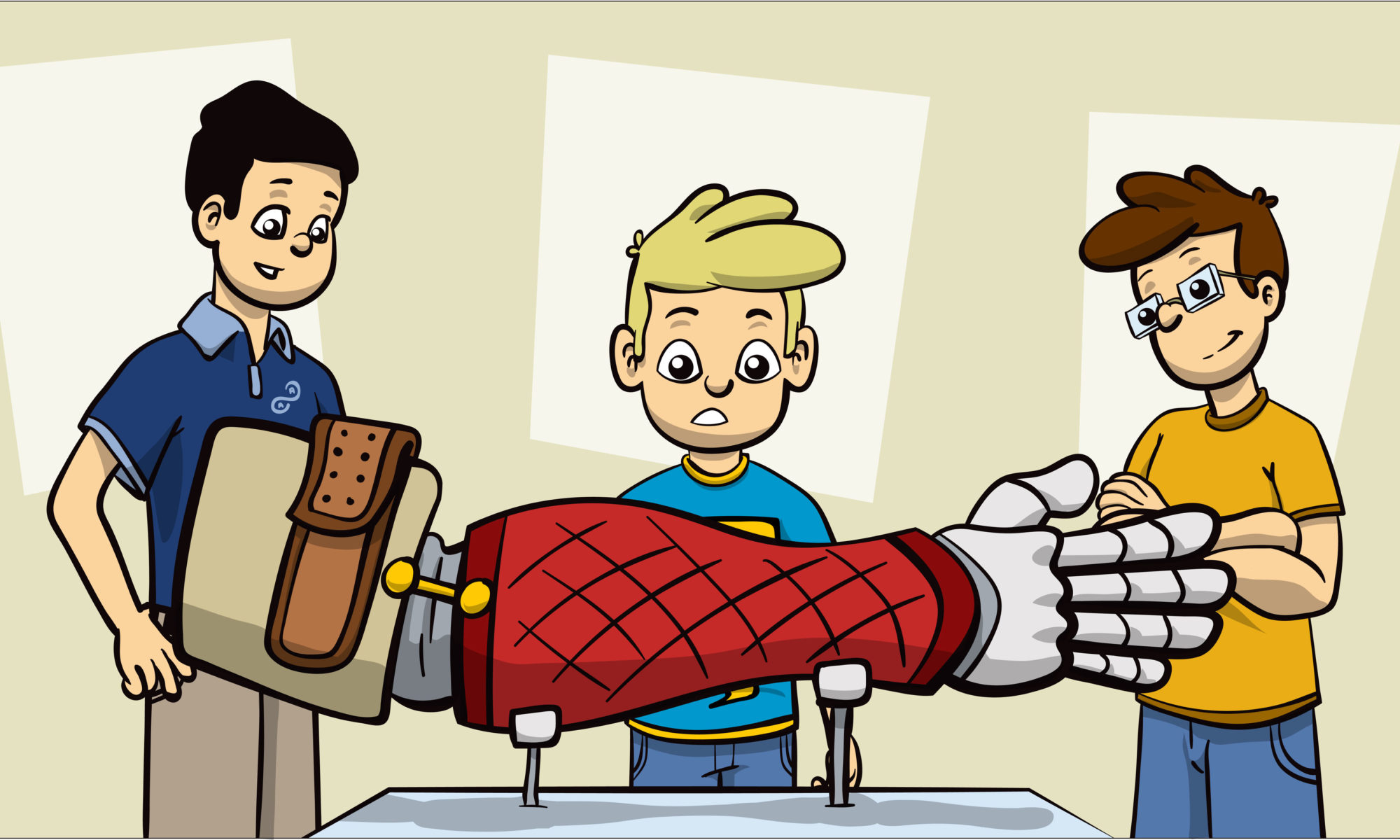
Limbitless Solutions, The Bionic Kid Comic Book

In December 2018, Limbitless Solutions released a comic book entitled The Bionic Kid. The comic book was written by Zachary, one of the Limbitless Solutions bionic kids, his brother Christo, and their dad Niko. The visuals were created by student artists at the University of Central Florida with assistance from professors at UCF School of Visual Arts and Design, The Bionic Kid is being sold in order to support those with limb difference. This comic tells the story of Zachary, one of the bionic kids. They attend the 8-Bit-World Finals where Zachary ends up playing the accessible video game Bash Bro against a bully named Norman. After both are electrocuted in an accident, the each receive special powers. In the comic, Zachary is referred to as The Bionic Kid, Norman is called Aquarius, and Limbitless Solutions Executive Director Albert Manero is a character as well.

==== Accessible games ====
Limbitless Solutions also created custom video game controllers that have been created to utilize the same EMG input that is used to operate the prosthetic arms. Typically, traditional controllers have not fully considered disabled user-experience, but Limbitless is creating new accessibility tools for not only their Bionic Kids, but many others in the same situation. Inclusive gaming not only trains Bionic Kids, but empowers through creativity.
