= SLM Solutions Group AG =

German maker of 3D metal printers

Coordinates: 53.864442°N 10.613705°E

Nikon SLM Solutions AG
- Type: Corporation
- ISIN: DE000A111338
- Industry: Machinery
- Founded: 2006
- Headquarters: Lübeck, Germany
- Key people: Hamid Zarringhalam (Chairman); Sam O’Leary (CEO); Charles Grace (CCO); Jan-Niklas Thielmann (CFO)
- Number of employees: +650 (2024)
- Website: www.nikon-slm-solutions.com

Nikon SLM Solutions AG, headquartered in Lübeck, Germany, is a manufacturer of 3D metal printers listed on the stock market and co-owner of the word mark SLM. The shares of SLM Solutions Group AG have been listed in Prime Standard of the Frankfurt Stock Exchange since May 9, 2014.

== History ==
Between 1996 and 1998, the companies F & S Stereolithografietechnik GmbH (Fockele & Schwarze), Trumpf GmbH and the Fraunhofer Institute for Laser Technology began with initial research on laser fusion processes. After the founding of a European Technology Center for rapid prototyping in Kaarst (Germany), the British Mining and Chemical Products Ltd. (MCP) introduced the technique of selective laser melting while Fockele & Schwarze received various patents in this area.

F & S and MCP formed a partnership and jointly developed marketable SLM devices. MCP was a pioneer in the laser processing of aluminum and titanium. The equipment was developed and manufactured at the subsidiary HEK GmbH in Lübeck. In the wake of corporate restructuring at MCP, this company division headed by Hans-Joachim Ihde was spun off in 2008 into MTT Technologies GmbH – later SLM Solutions GmbH —founded in 2006 and sold to Mr. Ihde and Henner Schöneborn. Both are still (as May 2014) involved in SLM Solutions Group AG.

ING Groep also participated in SLM via its fund Parcom Germany I and acquired more than half of the shares. In preparation for the planned IPO, the company was integrated into the newly founded SLM Holding GmbH, which was renamed SLM Solutions Group AG in 2014.

Consequently, the formal foundation year of the company is 2014, while the origins of the company go back to the 1990s. In a self-representation, it even goes back to the setting up of a Bolivian bismuth mine in the 1860s. The securities prospectus for the IPO cites 2006 as the foundation date of the operating company. Within the context of the IPO in May 2014, the SLM Solutions Group AG netted €75 million by issuing new shares. At the same time, the existing shareholders – mainly Parcom – sold shares at the quoted value of €105 million. The sale of old shares at a quoted value of 103 to 163 million euros was planned. Key strategic partnerships were concluded in the year 2016. In the area of application software, SLM Solutions Software GmbH was founded together with the Austrian CADS GmbH from Perg in February 2016. The common goal is the development of software that facilitates the optimal design of components for additive manufacturing. In addition, 3D Metal Powder GmbH was entered in the commercial register on July 14, 2016, with the objective of supplying custom-tailored consumable material for the respective customer applications.

== Business and financial position ==
In the years prior to the IPO, SLM Solutions experienced growing demand for 3D printers and correspondingly strong growth. The following table shows some key business figures:

Year	SLM Systems sold	Sales (million €)	EBITDA* (million €)	EBITA* (million €)	Employees (annual average)
2011	7	11.9	1.2	0.8	46
2012	21	17.5	1.9	1.5	52
2013	28	21.6	2.5	1.5	74
2014	49	33.5	4.5	-6.0**	148
2015	93	66.1	8.1	4.9	200
2016	118	80.7	3.1	-0.7	300

* EBITDA adjusted for "one-time expense" as specified by the company; EBIT according to the profit and loss account, adjusted for depreciation from the purchase price allocation

** Including €8.4 M expenses in connection with the IPO

== Circle of shareholders ==
Since the IPO, a good 55% of the shares are held in widespread shareholdings

On 2 September 2022, Nikon announced plans for a public takeover of SLM Solutions for €622m. Nikon said it has already obtained binding commitments from SLM's key shareholders Elliott Advisors, ENA Investment Capital and SLM's founder Hans J Ihde to support the deal, which is expected to close in the first half of 2023. This comes after a failed acquisition by General Electric Co. back in 2016 which saw SLM's key shareholder, Elliott Management Corp., blocked the bid.
