= Chuck Hull =

American technology inventor (born 1939)

- Born: May 12, 1939 (age 87)
- Known for: STL file format, SLA 3D printer
- Scientific career
- Fields: Engineering

Chuck Hull (Charles W. Hull; born May 12, 1939) is an American inventor who is the co-founder, executive vice president and chief technology officer for regenerative medicine of 3D Systems. He is one of the inventors of the SLA 3D printer, the first commercial rapid prototyping technology, and the widely used STL file format. He is named on more than 60 U.S. patents as well as other patents around the world in the fields of ion optics and rapid prototyping. He was inducted into the National Inventors Hall of Fame in 2014 and elected to the National Academy of Engineering in February of 2025.

== Early life ==
Chuck Hull was born on May 12, 1939, in Clifton, Colorado, the son of Lester and Esther Hull. His early life was spent in Clifton and Gateway, Colorado. He graduated from Central High School in Grand Junction, Colorado. He received a Bachelor of Science in engineering physics from the University of Colorado Boulder in 1961. He is also a distinguished alumnus of Colorado Mesa University.

== Beginnings of stereolithography ==
Hull first came up with the idea in 1983 when he was using UV light to harden tabletop coatings. But on July 16, 1984, Alain Le Méhauté, Olivier de Witte and Jean Claude André filed their patent for the stereolithography process. It was three weeks before Hull filed his own patent for stereolithography. The application of French inventors were abandoned by the French General Electric Company (now Alcatel-Alsthom) and CILAS (The Laser Consortium). The claimed reason was "for lack of business perspective". Hull coined the term "stereolithography" in his U.S. patent 4,575,330 entitled "Apparatus for Production of Three-Dimensional Objects by Stereolithography" issued on March 11, 1986. He defined stereolithography as a method and apparatus for making solid objects by successively "printing" thin layers of the ultraviolet curable material one on top of the other. In Hull's patent, a concentrated beam of ultraviolet light is focused onto the surface of a vat filled with liquid photopolymer. The light beam, moving under computer control, draws each layer of the object onto the surface of the liquid. Wherever the beam strikes the surface, the photopolymer polymerizes/crosslinks and changes to a solid. An advanced CAD/CAM/CAE software mathematically slices the computer model of the object into a large number of thin layers. The process then builds the object layer by layer starting with the bottom layer, on an elevator that is lowered slightly after solidification of each layer.

== Commercial rapid prototyping ==
In 1986, commercial rapid prototyping was started by Hull when he founded 3D Systems in Valencia, California. He realized that his concept was not limited to liquids and therefore gave it the generic name "stereolithography" (3D printing), and filed broad patent claims covering any "material capable of solidification" or "material capable of altering its physical state".

Hull built up a patent portfolio covering many fundamental aspects of today's additive manufacturing technologies such as data preparation via triangulated models (STL file format) and slicing, and exposure strategies such as alternating hatch directions.

The salary for his role as 3D Systems CTO was $307,500 in 2011.

== Recognition ==
- 2014 winner of the European Inventor Award in the Non-European countries category awarded by the European Patent Office
- 2015 winner of the Industrial Research Institute's IRI Achievement Award for his invention of stereolithography.
- 2017 inducted into the TCT Hall of Fame.
- 2020 winner of the Royal Photographic Society Progress Medal.
- 2023 Recipient of National Medal of Technology and Innovation awarded by President Joe Biden for outstanding contributions to America’s economic, environmental, and social well-being.
- 2025 Election to National Academy of Engineering for his invention of stereolithography.
