= Stereolithography =

3D printing technique

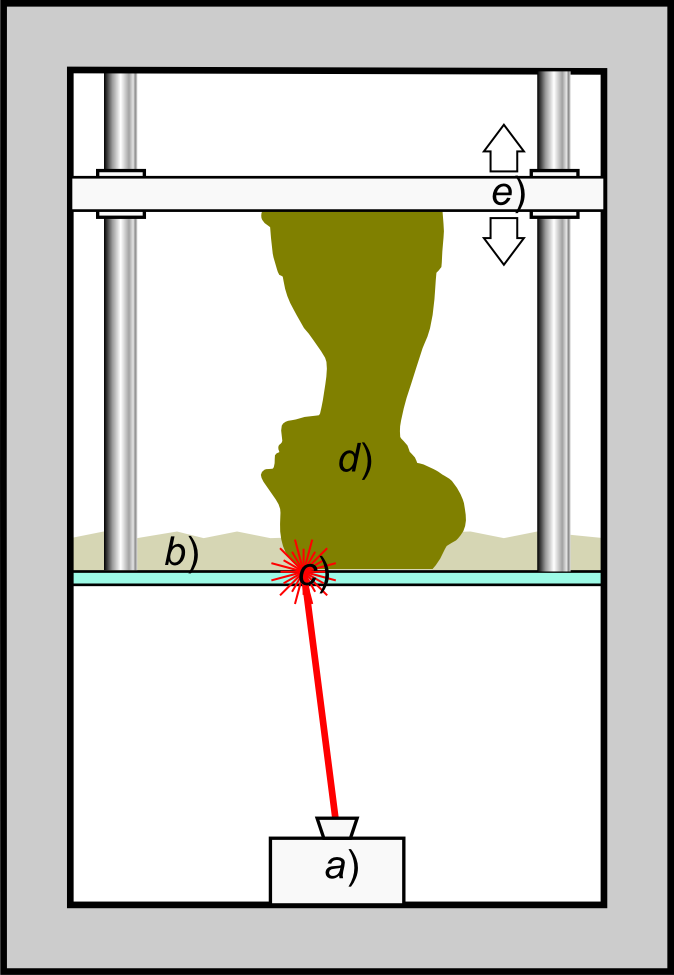
Schematic representation of stereolithography: a light-emitting device a) A laser or DLP selectively illuminates the transparent bottom c) of a tank b) filled with a liquid photo-polymerizing resin. The solidified resin d) is progressively dragged up by a lifting platform e)

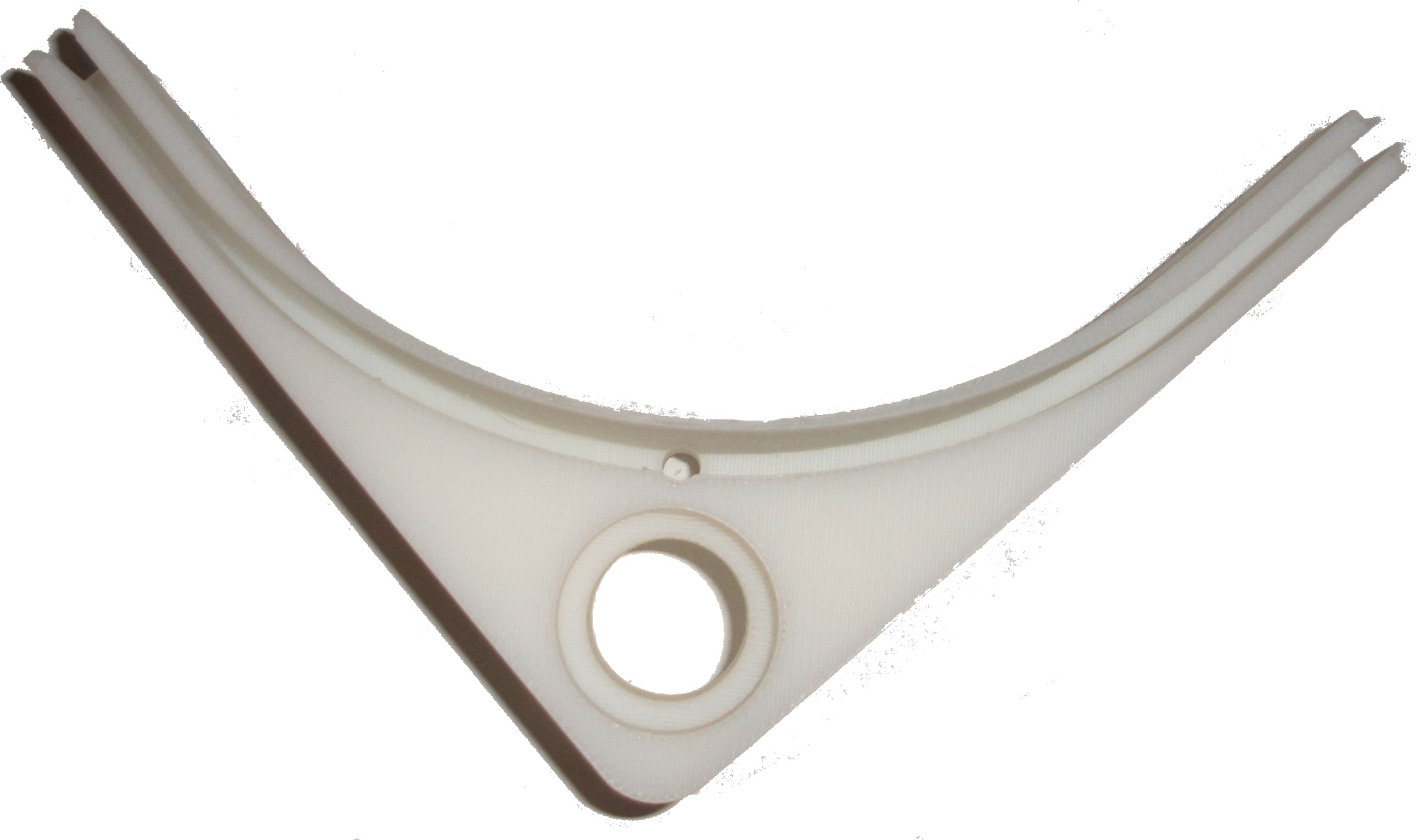
An SLA-produced part

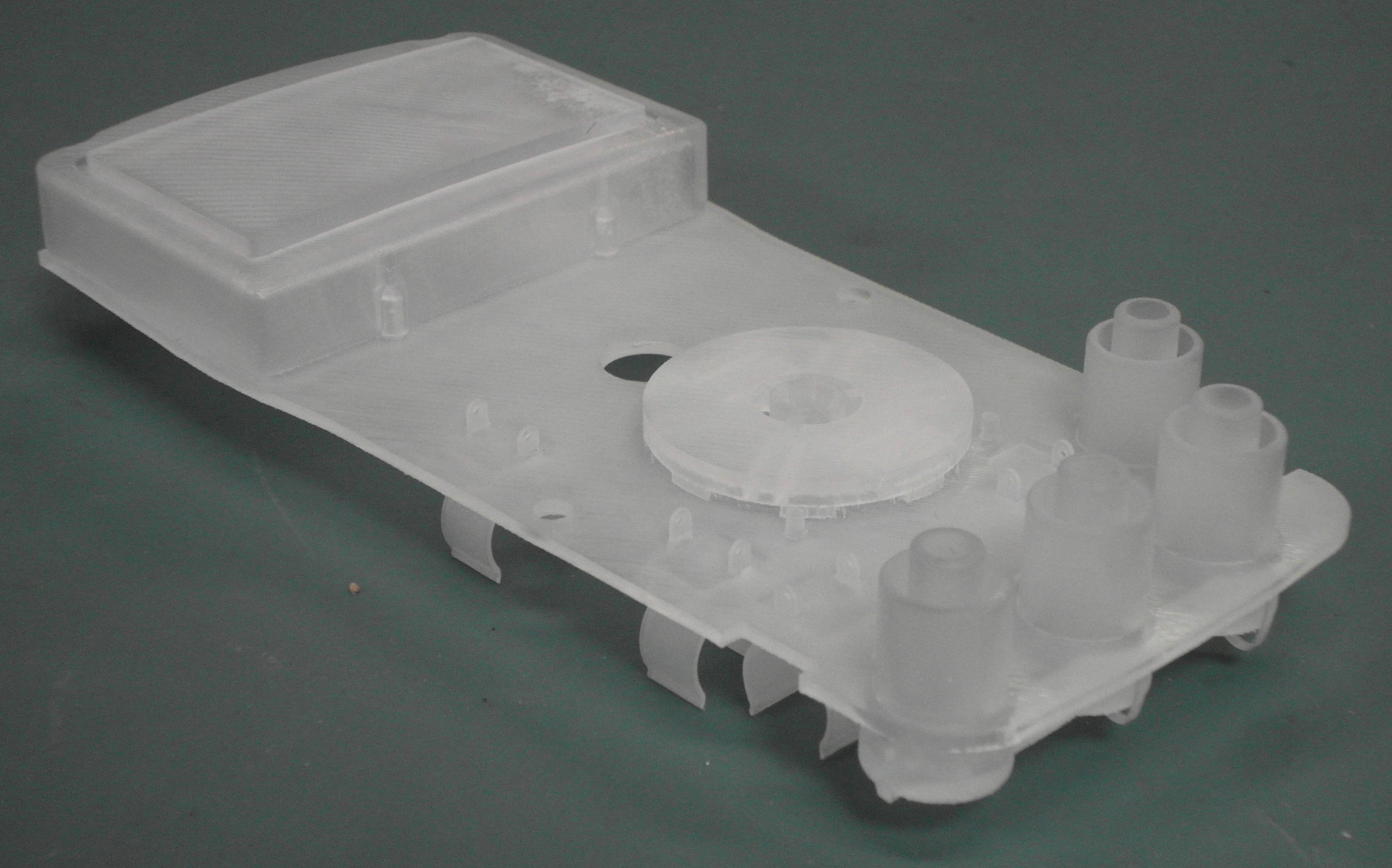
An SLA-printed model of a circuit board with various components to simulate the final product.

Stereolithography (SLA or SL; also known as vat photopolymerisation, optical fabrication, photo-solidification, or resin printing) is a form of 3D printing technology used for creating models, prototypes, patterns, and production parts in a layer-by-layer fashion using photochemical processes by which light causes chemical monomers and oligomers to cross-link together to form polymers. Those polymers then make up the body of a three-dimensional solid. Research in the area had been conducted during the 1970s, but the term was coined by Chuck Hull in 1984 when he applied for a patent on the process, which was granted in 1986. Stereolithography can be used to create prototypes for products in development, medical models, and computer hardware, as well as in many other applications.

== History ==
Stereolithography is an early and widely-used 3D printing technology. In the early 1980s, Japanese researcher Hideo Kodama first invented the modern layered approach to stereolithography by using ultraviolet light to cure photosensitive polymers. In 1984, just before Chuck Hull filed his own patent, Alain Le Mehaute, Olivier de Witte, and Jean Claude André, filed a patent for the stereolithography process. The French inventors' patent application was abandoned by the French General Electric Company (now Alcatel-Alsthom) and CILAS (The Laser Consortium). Le Mehaute believes that the abandonment reflects a problem with innovation in France.

The term “stereolithography” (Greek: stereo-solid and lithography) was coined in 1984 by Chuck Hull when he filed his patent for the process. Hull patented stereolithography as a method of creating 3D objects by successively "printing" thin layers of an object using a medium curable by ultraviolet light, starting from the bottom layer to the top layer. Hull's patent described a concentrated beam of ultraviolet light focused onto the surface of a vat filled with a liquid photopolymer. The beam is focused onto the surface of the liquid photopolymer, creating each layer of the desired 3D object by means of crosslinking (generation of intermolecular bonds in polymers). It was invented with the intent of allowing engineers to create prototypes of their designs in a more time effective manner. After the patent was granted in 1986, Hull co-founded the world's first 3D printing company, 3D Systems, to commercialize it.

Stereolithography's success in the automotive industry allowed 3D printing to achieve industry status and the technology continues to find innovative uses in many fields of study. Attempts have been made to construct mathematical models of stereolithography processes and to design algorithms to determine whether a proposed object may be constructed using 3D printing.

== Technology ==
Stereolithography is an additive manufacturing process that, in its most common form, works by focusing an ultraviolet (UV) laser on to a vat of photopolymer resin. With the help of computer-aided manufacturing or computer-aided design (CAM/CAD) software, the UV laser is used to draw a pre-programmed design or shape on to the surface of the photopolymer vat. Photopolymers are sensitive to ultraviolet light, so the resin is photochemically solidified and forms a single layer of the desired 3D object. Then, the build platform lowers one layer and a blade recoats the top of the tank with resin. This process is repeated for each layer of the design until the 3D object is complete. Completed parts must be washed with a solvent to clean wet resin from their surfaces.

It is also possible to print objects "bottom up" by using a vat with a transparent bottom and focusing the UV or deep-blue polymerization laser upward through the bottom of the vat. An inverted stereolithography machine starts a print by lowering the build platform to touch the bottom of the resin-filled vat, then moving upward the height of one layer. The UV laser then writes the bottom-most layer of the desired part through the transparent vat bottom. Then the vat is "rocked", flexing and peeling the bottom of the vat away from the hardened photopolymer; the hardened material detaches from the bottom of the vat and stays attached to the rising build platform, and new liquid photopolymer flows in from the edges of the partially built part. The UV laser then writes the second-from-bottom layer and repeats the process. An advantage of this bottom-up mode is that the build volume can be much bigger than the vat itself, and only enough photopolymer is needed to keep the bottom of the build vat continuously full of photopolymer. This approach is typical of desktop SLA printers, while the right-side-up approach is more common in industrial systems.

Stereolithography requires the use of supporting structures which attach to the elevator platform to prevent deflection due to gravity, resist lateral pressure from the resin-filled blade, or retain newly created sections during the "vat rocking" of bottom-up printing. Supports are typically created automatically during the preparation of CAD models and can also be made manually. In either situation, the supports must be removed manually after printing.

Other forms of stereolithography build each layer by LCD masking, or using a DLP projector.

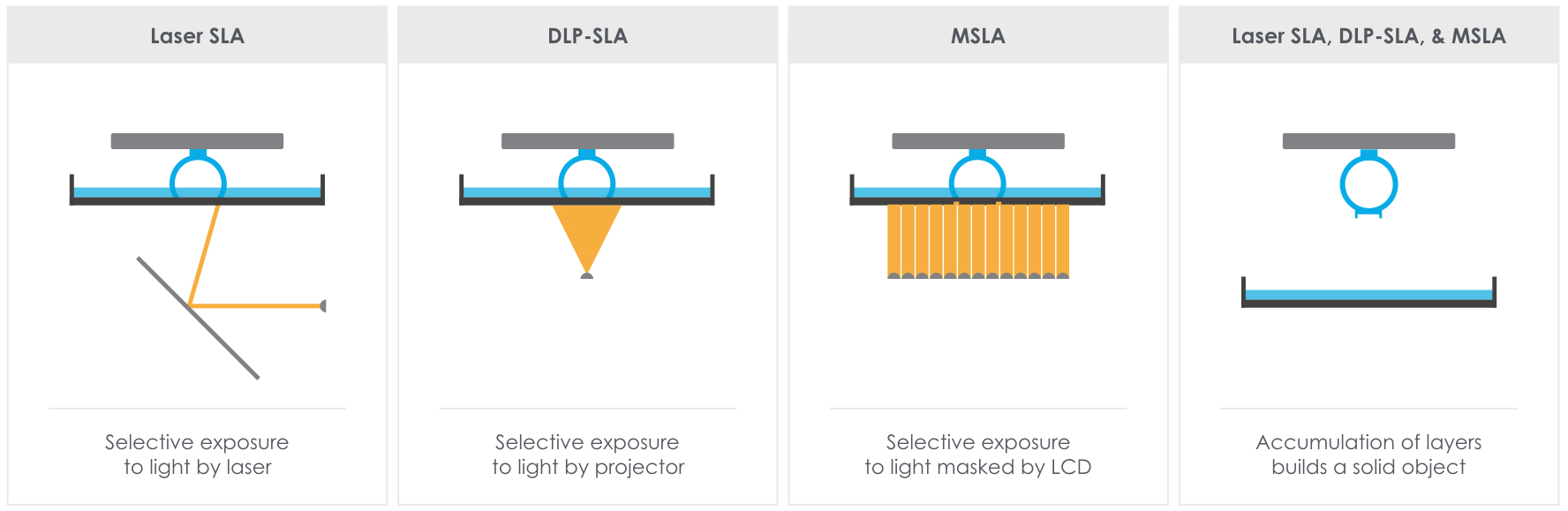
Three unique methods of spatial light modulation, which control light pattern positions in 3D space over time

== Materials ==
The liquid materials used for SLA printing are commonly referred to as "resins" and are thermoset polymers. A wide variety of resins are commercially available, and it is also possible to use homemade resins. Material properties vary according to formulation configurations: "materials can be soft or hard, heavily filled with secondary materials like glass and ceramic, or imbued with mechanical properties like high heat deflection temperature or impact resistance". Recently, some studies have tested the possibility to green or reusable materials to produce "sustainable" resins. It is possible to classify the resins in the following categories:

- Standard resins, for general prototyping
- Engineering resins, for specific mechanical and thermal properties
- Dental and medical resins, for biocompatibility certifications
- Castable resins, for zero ash-content after burnout
- Biomaterial resins, formulated as aqueous solutions of synthetic polymers like polyethylene glycol, or biological polymers such as gelatin, dextran, or hyaluronic acid.

== Uses ==
=== Medical modeling ===
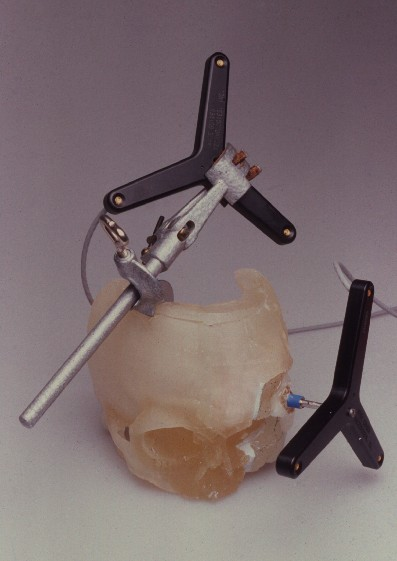
Stereolithographic model of a skull

Stereolithographic models have been used in medicine since the 1990s, for creating accurate 3D models of various anatomical regions of a patient, based on data from computer scans. Medical modelling involves first acquiring a CT, MRI, or other scan. This data consists of a series of cross-sectional images of the human anatomy. In these images, different tissues show up as different levels of grey. Selecting a range of grey values enables specific tissues to be isolated. A region of interest is then selected and all the pixels connected to the target point within that grey value range are selected. This enables a specific organ to be selected. This process is called segmentation. The segmented data may then be translated into a format suitable for stereolithography. While stereolithography is normally accurate, the accuracy of a medical model depends on many factors, especially the operator performing the segmentation correctly. There are potential errors possible when making medical models using stereolithography, but these can be avoided with practice and well-trained operators.

Stereolithographic models are used as an aid to diagnosis, preoperative planning, and implant design and manufacture. This might involve planning and rehearsing osteotomies, for example. Surgeons use models to help plan surgeries, and prosthetists and technologists also use models as an aid to the design and manufacture of custom-fitting implants. For instance, medical models created through stereolithography can be used to help in the construction of cranioplasty plates.

In 2019, scientists at Rice University published an article in the journal Science, presenting soft hydrogel materials for stereolithography used in biological research applications.

=== Prototyping ===
Stereolithography is often used for prototyping parts. For a relatively low price, stereolithography can produce accurate prototypes, even of irregular shapes. Businesses can use those prototypes to assess the design of their product or as publicity for the final product.

== Advantages and disadvantages ==
=== Advantages ===
One of the advantages of stereolithography is its speed; functional parts can be manufactured within a day. The length of time it takes to produce a single part depends upon the complexity of the design and the size. Printing time can last anywhere from hours to more than a day. A unique advantage of LCD-based SLA systems is that additional detail or material in a given layer does not meaningfully increase print time, allowing great time savings on multiple parts if there is space to combine them in a single print.

SLA-printed parts, unlike those obtained from FFF/FDM, do not exhibit significant anisotropy (structural non-uniformity) and minimal visible layering pattern. The surface quality is, in general, superior. Prototypes and designs made with stereolithography are strong enough to be machined and can also be used to make master patterns for injection molding or various metal casting processes.

=== Disadvantages ===
Although stereolithography can be used to produce virtually any synthetic design, cost has historically been a disadvantage compared to FFF, though the price is coming down. Since 2012, public interest in 3D printing has inspired the design of several consumer SLA machines which are closer in price to other technologies.

SLA prints require hands-on post-processing steps (washing, drying, curing, and possibly removing support material) that are not needed with other methods. Another disadvantage is that the photopolymers are sticky and messy, and need to be handled with care.

The environmental impact of these processes requires more study to be understood, but in general, SLA technologies have not created any biodegradable or compostable forms of resin, while other 3D printing methods offer some compostable PLA options, and the VOCs released by liquid resins are a known health hazard as well as an olfactory irritant. The choice of materials is limited compared to FFF, which can process virtually any thermoplastic.

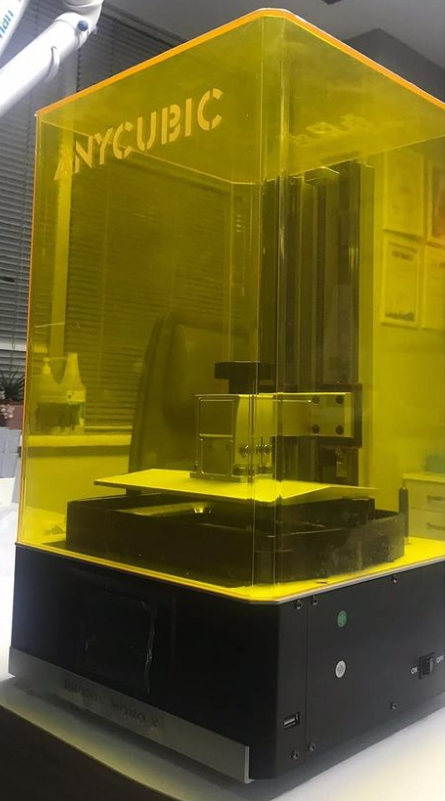
Yellow cabinet on a resin printer

== See also ==
- Fused filament fabrication (FFF or FDM)
- Selective laser sintering (SLS)
- Thermoforming
- laminated object manufacturing (LOM)
- .stl - file format

== Sources ==
- Kalpakjian, Serope, and Steven R. Schmid (2006). Manufacturing Engineering and Technology, 5th edition. Ch. 20. Upper Saddle River, NJ: Pearson Prentice Hall. pp. 586–587.
