= 3D Systems =

American manufacturer of 3D printers

3D Systems Corporation
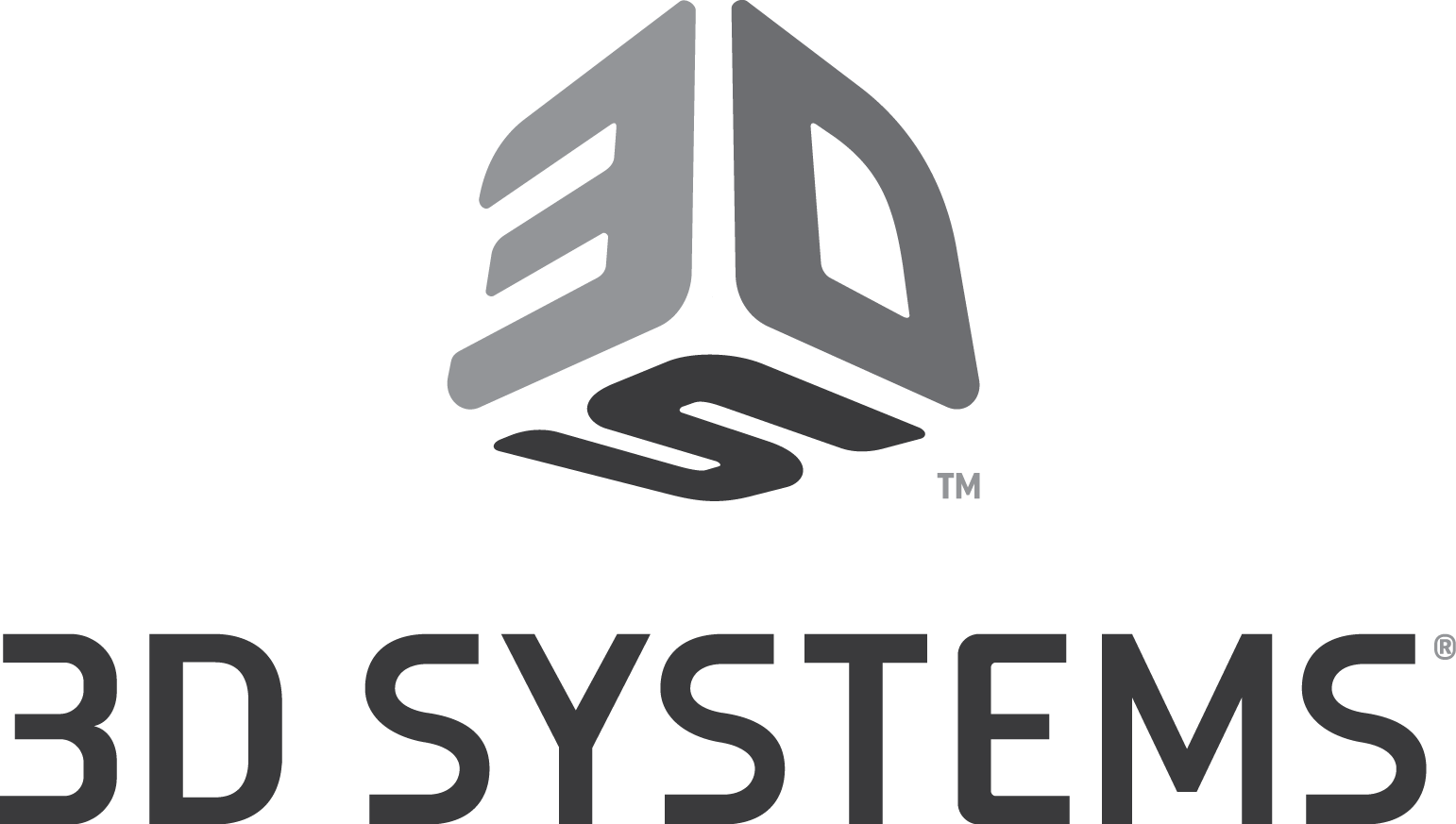
- Type: Public
- Traded as: NYSE: DDD
- Industry: Technology
- Founded: 1986; 40 years ago in Valencia, California, U.S.
- Headquarters: Rock Hill, South Carolina, U.S.
- Area served: Worldwide
- Key people: Jeff Graves (president & CEO); Chuck Hull (CTO); Andrew M. Johnson (CLO)
- Products: 3D Printers; Stereolithography (SLA) Systems; Selective Laser Sintering (SLS) Systems, Direct Metal Printing (DMP) SystemsFused Deposition Modeling (FDM) Systems; Figure 4 Standalone & Modular; Engineered Materials
- Services: SLA, SLS, DMP, FDM, CNC, Injection Molding, Investment Casting, Sheet Metal, Figure 4, Medical Grade Prototypes, Appearance Models, Low-Volume Mass Production
- Revenue: US$440 million (2024)
- Operating income: −US$277 million (2024)
- Net income: −US$255 million (2024)
- Total assets: US$601 million (2024)
- Total equity: US$176 million (2024)
- Number of employees: 1,925 (2023)
- Website: 3dsystems.com

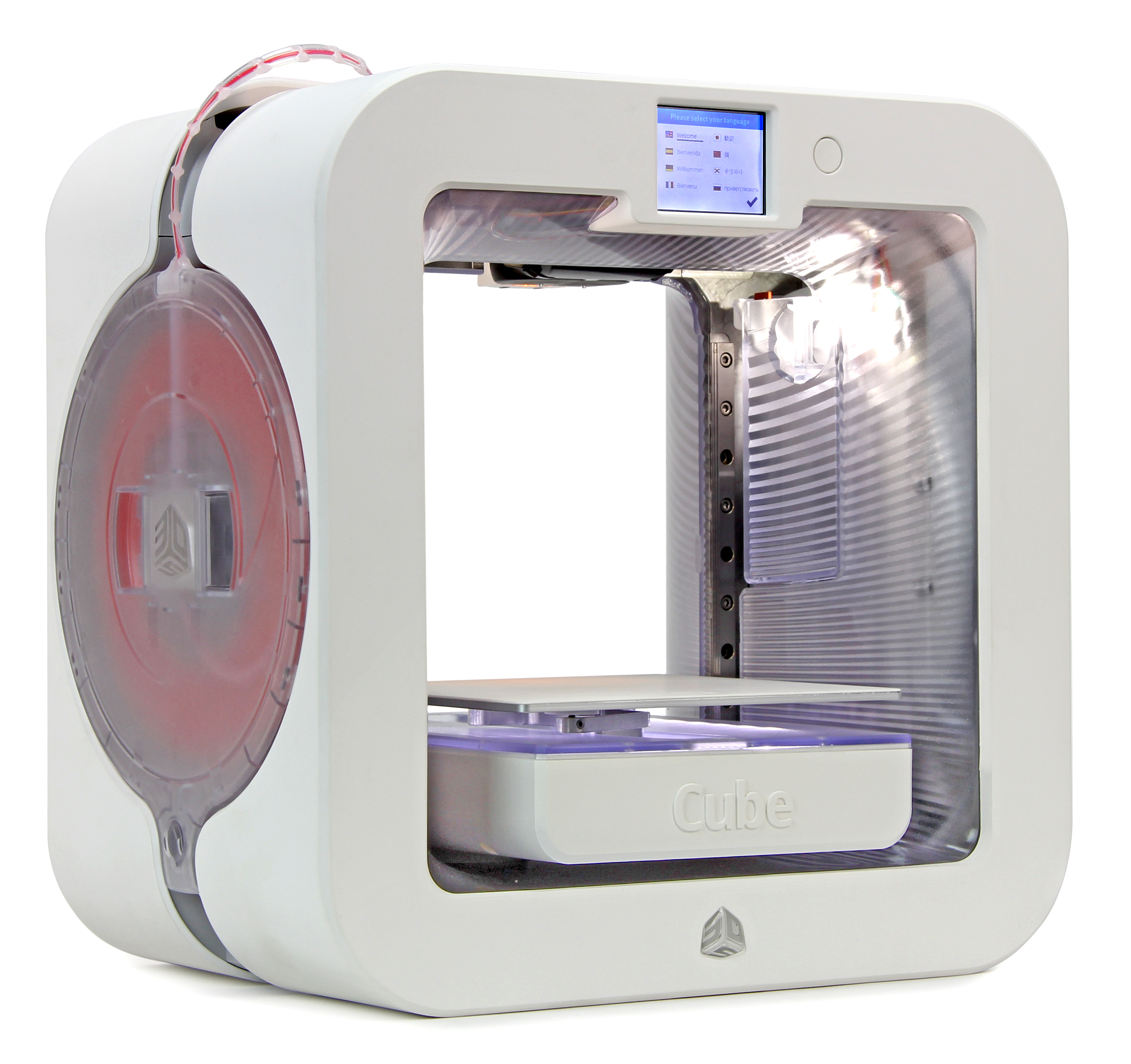
FFF/FDM 3D printer Cube3 by 3DSystems

3D Systems Corporation is an American company that engineers, manufactures, and sells 3D printing materials and application engineering services. Based in Rock Hill, South Carolina, the company creates product prototype conceptual models, master patterns for tooling, as well as production parts for direct digital manufacturing. It uses proprietary processes to fabricate physical objects using input from computer-aided design, 3D scanning and 3D sculpting devices.

== History ==
3D Systems was founded in Valencia, California by Chuck Hull, the inventor and patent-holder of the first stereolithography rapid prototyping (SLA) system.

In 2003, Hull was succeeded by Avi Reichental. Hull remains an active member of 3D Systems' board and serves as the company's Chief Technology Officer and Executive Vice President.

In 2005, 3D Systems relocated its headquarters to Rock Hill, South Carolina. In May 2011, 3D Systems transferred from Nasdaq (TDSC) to the New York Stock Exchange (DDD).

In January 2012, 3D Systems acquired Z Corporation for US$137 million. That same year, a Gray Wolf Report predicted 3D Systems' rate of growth to be unsustainable, pointing to inflated impressions from acquisitions as a corporate misstatement of organic growth. 3D Systems responded to this article on November 19, 2012, claiming it to "contain materially false statements and erroneous conclusions that we believe defamed the company and its reputation and resulted in losses to our shareholders".

In January 2014, it was announced that 3D Systems had acquired the collectibles company Gentle Giant Studios, which designs, develops, and manufactures three-dimensional representations of characters from franchises including Marvel, Disney, AMC's The Walking Dead, Avatar, Harry Potter and Star Wars. In July 2014, 3D Systems announced the acquisition of Israeli medical imaging company Simbionix for US$120,000,000. In September 2014, 3D Systems acquired the Leuven, Belgium-based LayerWise, a principal provider of direct metal 3D printing and manufacturing services spun off from KU Leuven. The terms of the acquisition were not disclosed by either company.

In January 2015, 3D Systems acquired the 3D printer manufacturer botObjects, the first company to commercialize a full-color printer using the fused filament fabrication technique. botObjects was founded by Martin Warner (CEO) and Mike Duma (CTO). botObjects' proprietary 5-color CMYKW cartridge system was claimed to be able to generate color combinations and gradients by mixing primary printing colors. There was some skepticism about botObjects' claims.

In April 2015, 3D Systems announced its acquisition of the Chinese Easyway Group, creating 3D Systems China. Easyway is a Chinese 3D printing sales and service provider, with key operations in Shanghai, Wuxi, Beijing, Guangdong, and Chongqing.

In October 2015, Reichental stepped down as the president and CEO of 3D Systems, Inc. and was replaced on an interim basis by the company's chief legal officer Andrew Johnson. Vyomesh Joshi (VJ) was appointed as president and CEO on April 4, 2016. On May 14, 2020, the 3D Systems board named Jeff Graves as president and CEO, effective May 26. He remains the CEO as of February 17, 2023.

3D Systems was included on Business Insider's "America's Most Innovative Businesses" 2027 list.

== Technology ==
3D Systems manufactures stereolithography (SLA), fused deposition modeling (FDM), selective laser sintering (SLS), color-jet printing (CJP), multi-jet printing (MJP), and direct metal printing (DMP, a version of SLS that uses metal powder) systems. Each technology uses digital 3D data to create parts through an additive layer-by-layer process. The systems vary in their materials, print capacities, and applications.

Color jet printing uses inkjet technology to deposit a liquid binder across a bed of powder. Powder is released and spread with a roller to form each new layer. This technology was originally developed by Z Corporation.

Multi-jet printing refers to the process of depositing liquid photopolymers onto a build surface using inkjet technology. A high resolution is attainable, with a support material that can be easily removed in post-processing.

== Products and patents ==
As part of 3D Systems' effort to consolidate 3D printing under one company, its products span a range of 3D printers and print products to target users of its technologies across industries. 3D Systems offers both professional and production printers. In addition to printers, 3D Systems offers content creation software, including reverse engineering software and organic 3D modeling software. Following a razor and blades model, 3D Systems offers more than one hundred materials to be used with its printers, including waxes, rubber-like materials, metals, composites, plastics and nylons.

3D Systems is a closed-source company, using in-house technologies for product development and patents to protect their technologies from competitors. Critics of the closed-source model have blamed seemingly slow development and innovation in 3D printing not on a lack of technology, but on a lack of open information sharing within the industry, and supporters argue that the right to patents inspires and motivates higher-quality innovations.

In November 2012, 3D Systems filed a lawsuit against prosumer 3D printer company Formlabs and the Kickstarter crowdfunding website over Formlabs' attempt to fund a printer which it claimed infringed its patent on "Simultaneous multiple layer curing in stereolithography." The legal procedure lasted more than two years and was significant enough to be covered in a Netflix documentary about 3D printing, called "Print the Legend".

3D Systems has applied for patents for the following innovations and technologies: the rapid prototyping and manufacturing system and method; radiation-curable compositions useful in image projection systems; compensation of actinic radiation intensity profiles for 3D modelers; apparatus and methods for cooling laser-sintered parts; radiation-curable compositions useful in solid freeform fabrication systems; apparatus for 3D printing using imaged layers; compositions and methods for selective deposition modeling; edge smoothness with low-resolution projected images for use in solid imaging; an elevator and method for tilting a solid image build platform for reducing air entrapment and for build release; selective deposition modeling methods for improved support-object interface; region-based supports for parts produced by solid freeform fabrication; additive manufacturing methods for improved curl control and sidewall quality; support and build material and applications.

== Applications and industries ==
3D Systems' products and services are used across industries to assist, either in part or in full, the design, manufacture and/or marketing processes. 3D Systems' technologies and materials are used for prototyping and the production of functional end-use parts, in addition to fast, precise design communication. Current 3D Systems-reliant industries include automotive, aerospace and defense, architecture, dental and healthcare, consumer goods, and manufacturing.

Examples of industry-specific applications include:

- Aerospace, for the manufacture and tooling of complex, durable and lighter-weight flight parts
- Architecture, for structure verification, design review, client concept communication, reverse structure engineering, and expedited scaled modeling
- Automotive, for design verification, difficult visualizations, and new engine development
- Defense, for lightweight flight and surveillance parts and the reduction of inventory with on-demand printing
- Dentistry, for restorations, molds and treatments. Invisalign orthodontics devices use 3D Systems' technologies
- Education, for equation and geometry visualizations, art education, and design initiatives
- Entertainment, for the manufacture and prototyping of action figures, toys, games and game components; printing of sustainable guitars and basses, multifunction synthesizers, etc.
- Healthcare, for customized hearing aids and prosthetics, improved medicine delivery methods, respiratory devices, therapeutics, and flexible endoscopy and laparoscopy devices for improved procedures and recovery times
- Manufacturing, for faster product development cycles, mold production, prototypes, and design troubleshooting

For industries such as aerospace and automotive, 3D Systems' technologies have reduced the time needed to incorporate design drafts and enabled the production of more efficient parts of lighter weight. Because 3D printing builds layer-by-layer according to design, it does not need to accommodate the traditional manufacturing tools of subtractive methods, often resulting in lighter parts and more efficient geometries.

== Operations ==
In 2007, the company consolidated its offices, operations, and research and development functions into a new global headquarters in Rock Hill, South Carolina, US. About half of the headquarters' 80,000 square feet (7,400 m^{2}) consist of research and development laboratories with an 18,000-square-foot (1,700 m^{2}) Rapid Manufacturing Center (RMC) with 3D Systems' rapid prototyping, rapid manufacturing and 3D printing systems at work.

With customers in 80 countries, 3D Systems has over 2100 employees in 25 worldwide locations, including San Francisco, Leuven, France, Germany, Italy, Switzerland, South Korea, Brazil, the United Kingdom, China and Japan. The company has more than 359 U.S. and foreign patents.

In 2019, the company consolidated resources within its On Demand domestic rapid printing service locations into Littleton, Seattle, Lawrenceburg, and Wilsonville. Restructuring and additions were made to the Lawrenceburg facility for future expansions and growth, which nearly doubled its size.

=== Community involvement and partnerships ===
3D Systems is involved in a multi-year agreement with the Smithsonian Institution as part of an effort to strengthen collections' stewardship and increase collection accessibility through 3D representations. In 2012, 3D Systems began partnering with the Scholastic Art & Writing Awards in the Future New category, where three winners are awarded with a $1000 scholarship in addition to the prizes and recognition granted to winners by the Scholastic Awards, and contributed two production-grade 3D printers to the National Network for Manufacturing Innovation (NNMI), which aims to re-localize manufacturing and increase US manufacturing competitiveness. 3D Systems is also a corporate underwriter of the National Children's Oral Health Foundation (NCOHF), which delivers educational, preventative and treatment oral health services to children in at-risk populations.

On February 18 of 2014, Ekso Bionics debuted the first ever 3D-printed hybrid exoskeleton in collaboration with 3D Systems.

== See also ==
- List of 3D printer manufacturers
