= Multi-material 3D printing =

3D printing technique

Multi-material 3D printing is the additive manufacturing procedure of using multiple materials at the same time to fabricate a workpiece. Similar to single material additive manufacturing it can be realised through various 3D printing methods such as fused filament fabrication (FFF), selective laser sintering (SLS), stereolithography (SLA) and inkjet (material jetting). By expanding the design space to different materials, it establishes the possibilities of creating 3D printed objects of different colours, that is multi-colour printing, or with different material properties like elasticity or solubility.

== History ==
One of the first multi-material 3D printers for consumers, Fab@Home, became publicly available in 2006. The concept was quickly adopted by the industry followed by many consumer-ready multi-material 3D printers.

== Multi-material 3D printing technologies ==
=== Fused filament fabrication (FFF) ===
Single-nozzle filament extruder design

Multi-nozzle filament extruder design

An SLA multi-material design

Material jetting 3D printing

Schematic of a binder jetting 3D printer

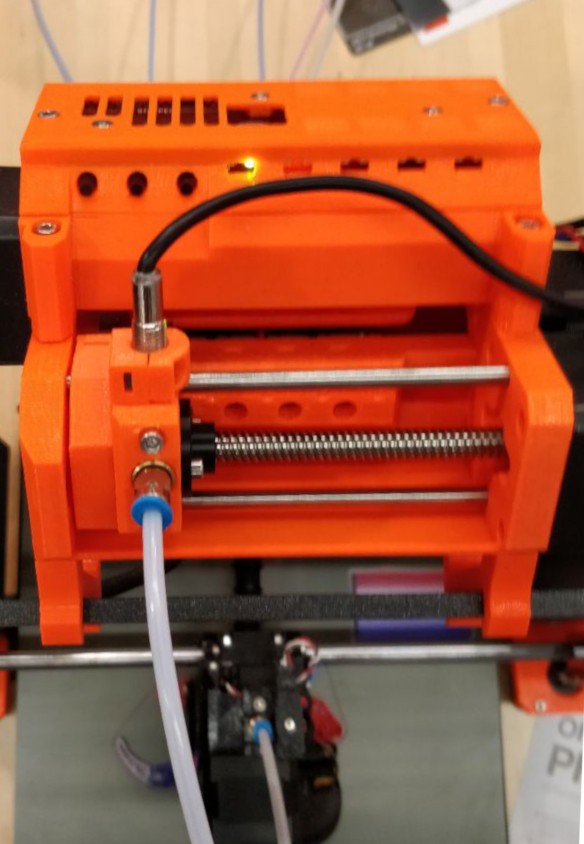
The Prusa Multi-Material Upgrade (MMU), used for example in some Prusa i3

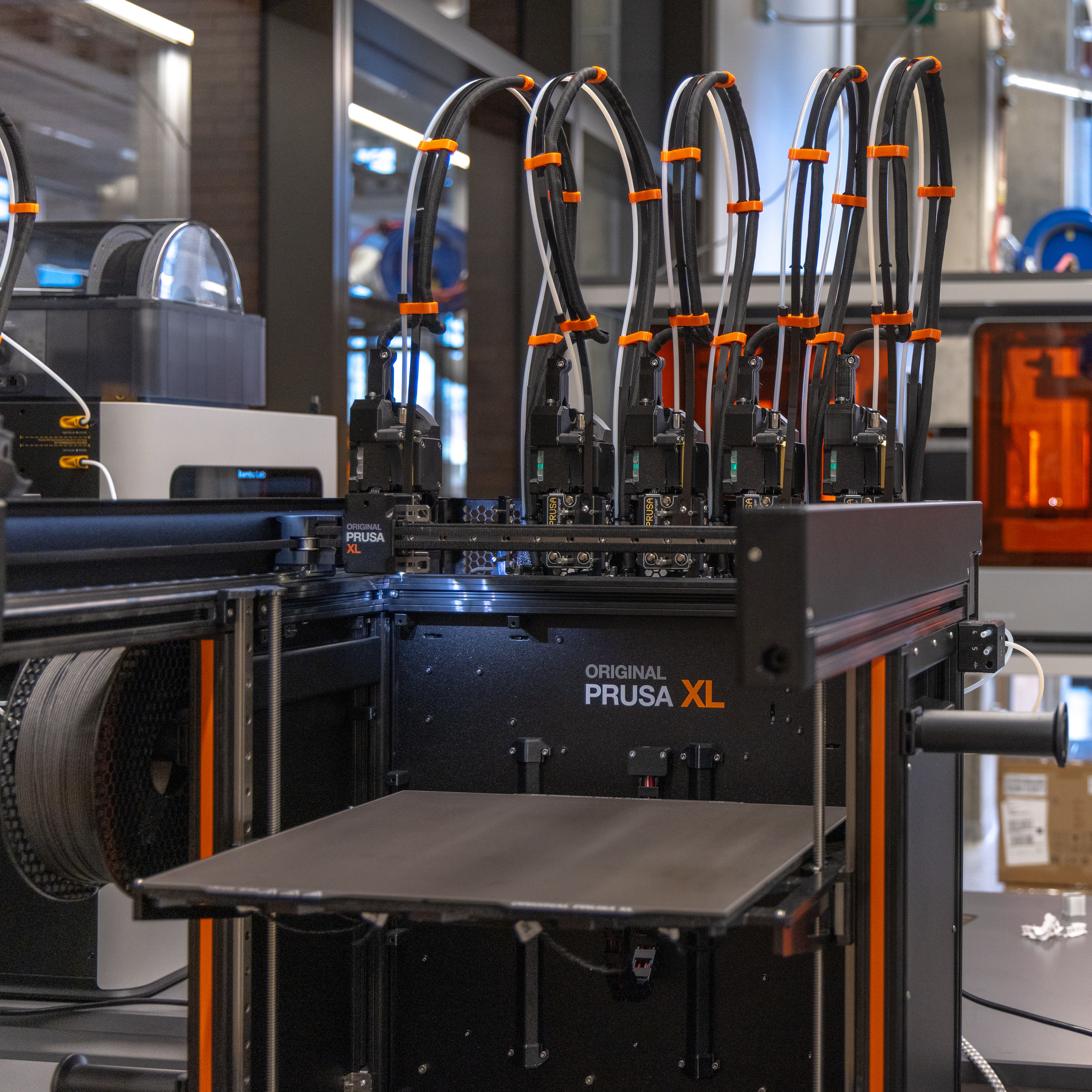
A Prusa XL printer with tool changer and 5 dedicated printheads

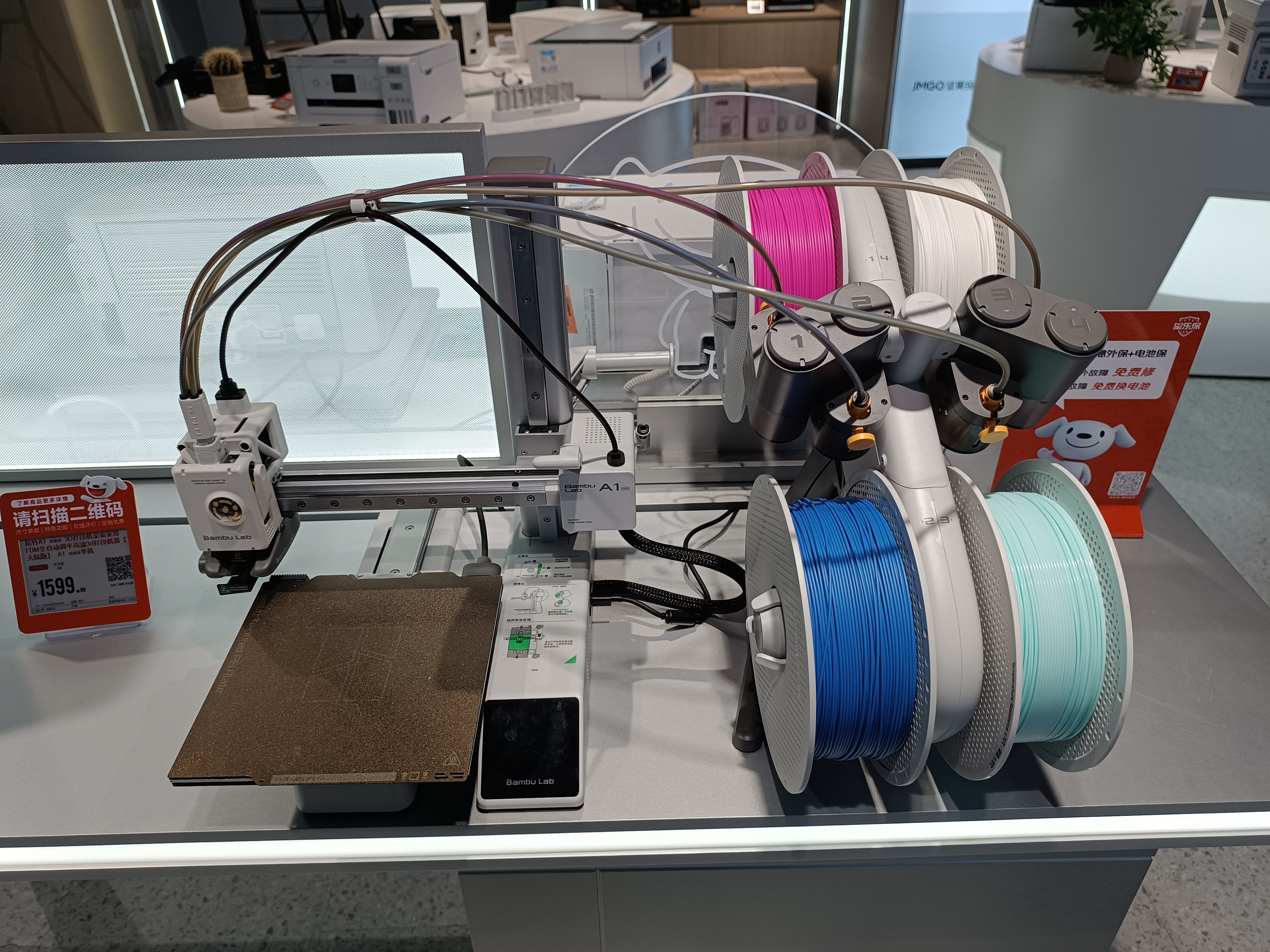
A Bambu Lab A1 Mini filament printer with Automatic Material System (AMS) supporting up to four different materials

Fused filament fabrication describes the process of continuously extruding a line of thermoplastic material to form a three dimensional model. The FFF process supports a variety of materials reaching from biodegradable ones like PLA to PETG, ABS and engineering-grade materials like PEEK. This technology additionally allows for the use of flexible materials like TPU.

Some possible solutions to realise a multi-material filament printer are:

- Single-nozzle:
  - Filament changer: For using different materials or filaments in the same nozzle. Some well-known commercial examples are Prusa Multi-Material Upgrade 3 (MMU3) and Bambu Lab's Automatic Material System (AMS), and some open-source alternatives are Enraged Rabbit Carrot Feeder (ERCF) and BoxTurtle for Voron Design.
- Multi-nozzle:
  - Tool changer: One dedicated printhead per material or filament, with a mechanism for switching between the multiple printheads. Each printhead (also called toolhead) has its own hotend, as well as an extruder in the case it is a direct-drive extruder. Commercial examples include Bambu Lab Vortek, Prusa XL and Snapmaker U1, while open-source alternatives include for example Stealtchanger and Tapchanger.
  - Nozzle-changer: A single printhead can swap between different nozzles, thereby using the same hotend and multiple materials or filaments. A commercial examples includes Bondtech INDX.
- Separate gantries: Multiple printheads can run independently, like for example independent dual extruder (IDEX) in the case of two printheads, or independent quad extruder (IQEX) in the case of four printheads.
- Combinations of the methods above can allow for even more combinations of filaments, at an additional complexity

==== Single-nozzle design ====
The single nozzle design combines the different materials before or in the melting zone of the print head such that the materials are extruded through the same nozzle. For example: The different filaments can be cut and rejoined to a single strand of a mixed filament before being fed into the melting chamber. Such a technique is implemented in the Mosaic Palette. Another example is the Multi-Material Upgrade by Prusa Research, which is mounted on top of a single material printer to add multi-material capabilities. It uses a bowden style extrusion system with an additional axis to cut and select the material. To prevent impurities inside of the object, a combined melting chamber has to be cleared from the previous material before a new one can be used. Depending on the implementation, the amount of waste material (often referred to as "poop") produced during the printing process may be significant. In some implementations, the previous material may be used as in-fill to prevent waste, or to simultaneously print a different object in which the colour does not matter.

==== Multi-nozzle design ====
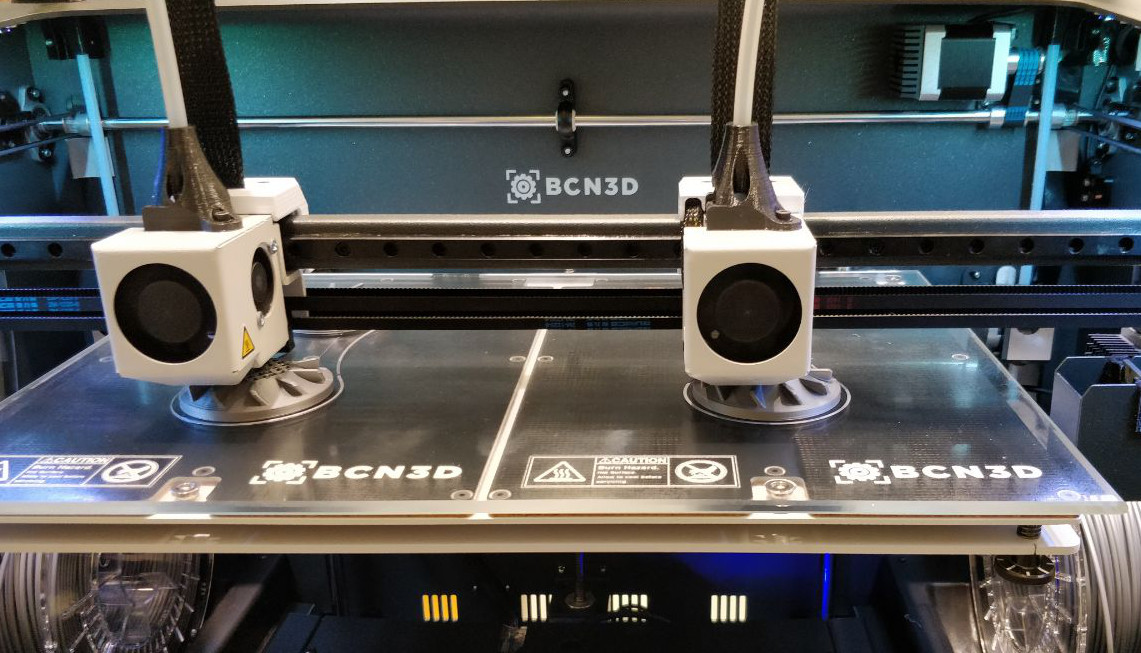
A printer with two print heads, that share two degrees of freedom

The multi-nozzle design features a separate nozzle for each material. The nozzle can either be mounted on the same print head or on independent print heads. For this approach to work the different nozzles have to be calibrated to the exact same height relative to the print surface to circumvent the interference of an inactive nozzle with the printed object. Such a design reduces the amount of waste material during the printing process significantly compared to a single-nozzle design which does not use the previous material as infill or to print another object.

=== Stereolithography (SLA) ===
Stereolithography is the process of solidifying a photopolymer with a laser layer by layer to form a three-dimensional object. To realize multi-material prints with this technology, one can use multiple reservoirs for different photopolymers. A major problem with this approach is the removal of the not yet polymerised material as the print may contain cavities filled with the old material, which should be emptied before the next material can be used. The photopolymer resins used for SLA can have highly different physical properties, generally being more brittle and having a lower heat deflection temperature. The SLA standard resins come in different colours and opacities. Besides the engineering grade materials like ABS-like or PP-like resin, there exists bio-compatible resins used for medical applications and flexible resins.

=== Material jetting ===
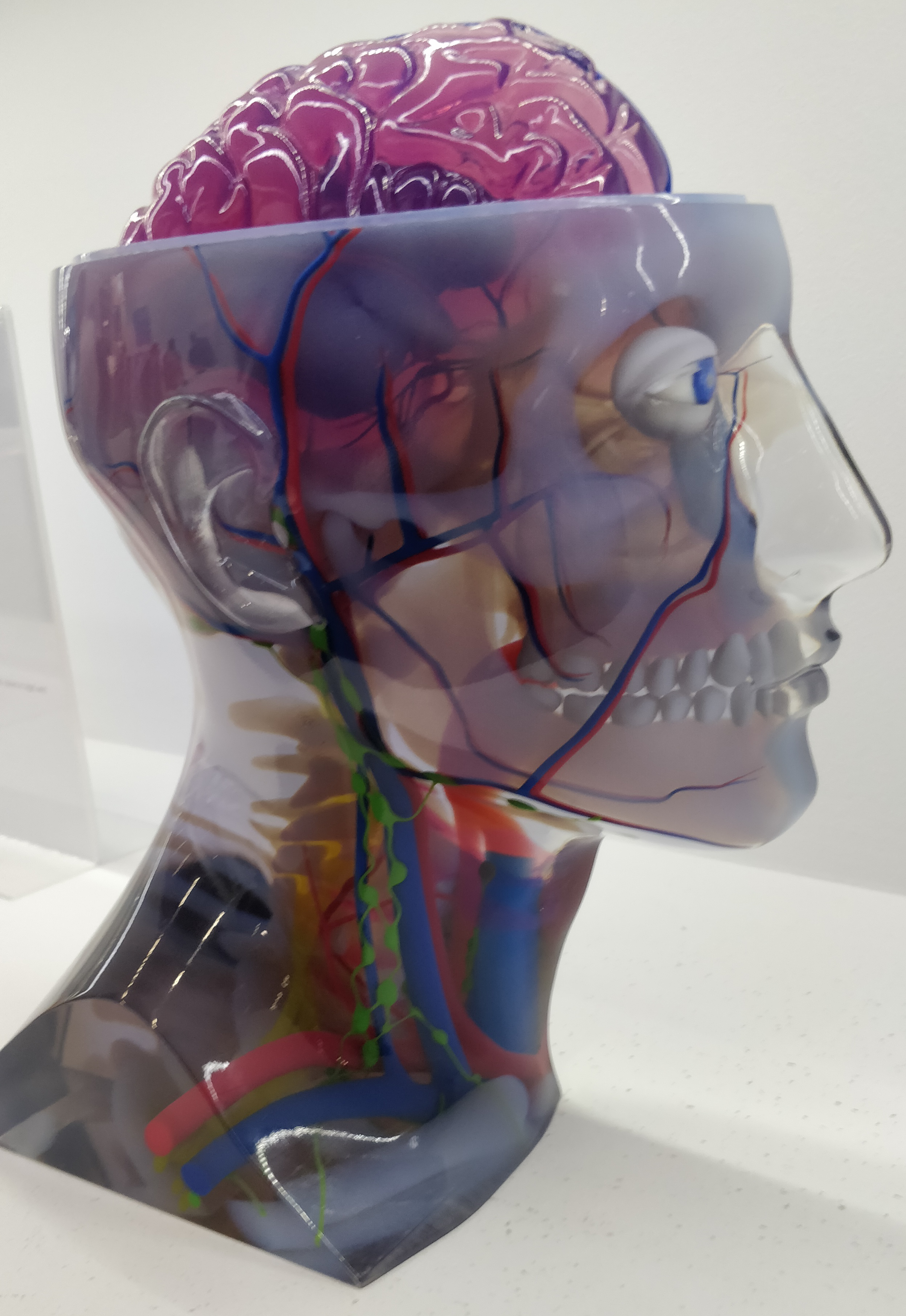
Material-jetted model of a human head

The process of material jetting, often also called inkjet 3D printing, is similar to the 2D inkjet printing procedure. The print head consists of multiple small nozzles which jet droplets of photopolymers on demand. Each nozzle can extrude different materials, which allows for the creation of multi-material parts. The droplets of material are then immediately cured using an ultraviolet light (UV) source mounted to the printhead. In contrast to the filament FFF printing process, a layer is not formed by moving the printhead along a pre-calculated path, but by scanning the layer line by line. For example, the Stratasys J750 allows for full colour prints. The materials supported by the material jetting printing process are similar to the ones of the SLA process, and hence share similar properties. Additionally there have been advances in the field of material jetting metals by suspending nano metal particles in a fluid. After the removal of the support material the printed object has to be sintered to create a final metal part.

=== Binder jetting ===
A binder jetting 3D printer uses particles of a fine-grained powder, which are fused together using a binder, to form a three-dimensional object. In principle, it consists out of two separate chambers: One functions as a reservoir for the powdered material, the other one as the printing chamber. To fabricate a layer of an object, a blade pushes the material out of the reservoir and spreads it over the printing surface to create a thin layer of powder. A print head similar to the one found in a 2D inkjet printer then applies the binder to the layer to solidify and bind it to the previous one. Although binder jetting does not allow for multi-material support, there exist printers, which feature a second print head to apply pigment to the layer after the binder to allow for full-colour prints.

== Workflow ==
=== Designing ===
Designing a three dimensional object is the first step in the workflow of 3D printing. This design process can be supported by software. Such computer-aided design (CAD) software is capable of creating, managing and manipulating different 3D geometric figures while giving the user feedback through a graphical interface. Most CAD programs already support the annotation of a geometric figure with a material. The combination of different geometries then forms a single multiple material object. However, not all file formats support the annotation of materials together with the geometry of the object.

=== Slicing ===
Slicing is the process of splitting a 3D model into layers to transform them into a sequence of G-code instructions. These instructions can be processed by a 3D printer to manufacture the corresponding model in either a bottom-up, top-down or even left to right manner. Before generating the instructions, support structures can be added to connect overhanging sections of the model to either the printing surface or other parts of the model. The support structures have to be removed in a post processing step after the print has finished.

The slicing process for multi-material prints differs depending on the hardware used. For fused filament based machines, instructions for changing the material have to be added. This comes with multiple computational challenges such as handling two print heads at the same time without them interfering with each other, or clearing the melting chamber from the previous material. For stereolitography based multi-material prints, the slicing software has to handle the additional degrees of freedom arising from the possibility of moving the print from one resin tray to the next one. The slicing procedure for material jetting printers involves the generation of multiple bitmap images representing the voxels of the object.

=== Post-processing ===
3D printed objects may need to be post processed before they can be used as a prototype or a finished product. Such post-processing steps may including sanding the surface of the object to make it smoother or painting it to match the colours of the design. Depending on the printing method and the objects geometry, support structures may have to be removed. The use of multi-material 3D printing can reduce the amount of post-processing needed for a workpiece that is to be coloured, as colours can be printed directly. Furthermore, it is possible to use a water soluble materials for printing the support structures, which can simplify their removal by only having to place the workpiece into a water bath.

== Applications ==
=== Food 3D printing ===
The rising trend of food 3D printing supports the customisation of shape, colour, flavour, texture and nutrition of different meals. Multi-material 3D printing enables using multiple ingredients like peanut butter, jelly or dough in the printing process, which is essential for the creation of most foods.

=== Medical applications ===
Multi-material 3D printing technology is often used in the production of 3D printed prosthetics. It enables the use of different materials like a soft TPU on the contact points with the body and a stiff carbon fibre material for the corpus of the prosthetics. The prosthetics can therefore be adjusted to suit the varying needs and desires of an individual.

Another medical use case is the generation of artificial tissue structures. The research focuses on creating tissue, that mimics human tissue in terms of feel, elasticity and structure. Such artificial tissues can be used by surgeons to train and learn on realistic models, which is otherwise hard or expensive to achieve.

Current research focuses on 3D printed drug delivery systems to efficiently deploy a medication or vaccine. Through the use of multi-material printing they create biocompatible structures that can interact with the human body on a cellular level.

=== Physical properties ===
The capability of switching between different materials is essential for controlling the physical properties of a 3D printed object. Besides being able to manipulate the strength of an object through micro-structures, the user can switch between harder or softer materials in the printing process to affect the rigidity of the object. Hard and soft material combination is also applied to fabricate biomimetic structure with desired properties. The use of materials of different colour or elasticity can affect the looks and the haptics of the resulting object. Additionally, it is possible to reduce the amount of post-processing needed by choosing a suitable material for the support structures or the outer hull of the part.

=== Rapid prototyping ===
Multi-material 3D printing enables designers to rapidly manufacture and test their prototypes. The use of multiple materials in a single part enables the designer to create functional and visually appealing prototypes. An example of how 3D printing can be included in the design process is automotive design. There, it is necessary to quickly test and verify a prototype to get the design approved for production. The reduced post-processing steps induced by the multi-material 3D printing technology result in a shorter fabrication time. Additionally, multi-material 3D printing reduces the part count of the produced prototypes compared to traditional fabrication methods like milling or molding, because the assembly of multiple parts with different materials is no longer required.

== File formats ==
There exist multiple file formats to represent three dimensional objects which are suitable for 3D printing. Yet not all of them support the definition of different materials in the same file as the geometry. The table below lists the most common file formats and their capabilities:

An overview of 3D printing file formats
File format	Mode of operation	Multi-material support	Remarks
STL	raw, unstructured triangulated surface	No	Multi-material support can be achieved by saving one STL mesh per material, which results in multiple files for the same 3D objects.
OBJ	vertices, texture mapping, vertex normals and faces	No	Multi-material support can be easily achieved with the companion file format MTL.
3MF	vertices and triangles saved as XML	Yes	Backed by the 3MF Consortium as a new standard file format for 3D printing.
VRML	vertices and edges, UV-mapped textures	Yes	Designed particular for the World Wide Web. Predecessor of the X3D file format.
X3D	vertice and edges, UV-mapped textures	Yes	Features capabilities for including animations.
PLY	vertices, faces and other	No	Successor of STL with support for colours.
