= 3D food printing =

3D printing techniques to make food

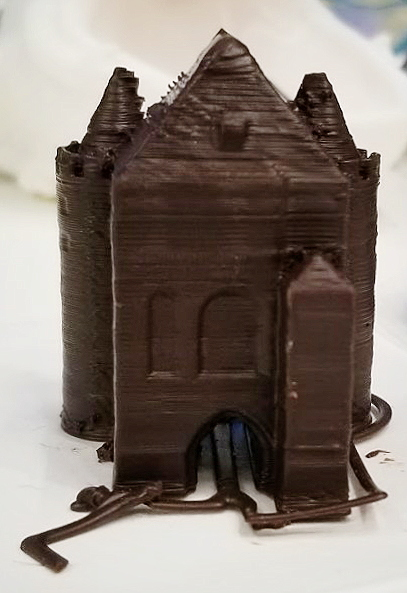
3D-printed chocolate

3D food printing is the process of manufacturing food products using a variety of additive manufacturing techniques. Most commonly, food grade syringes hold the printing material, which is then deposited through a food grade nozzle layer by layer. The most advanced 3D food printers have pre-loaded recipes on board and also allow the user to remotely design their food on their computers, phones or some IoT device. The food can be customized in shape, color, texture, flavor or nutrition, which makes it very useful in various fields such as space exploration and healthcare.

== History ==
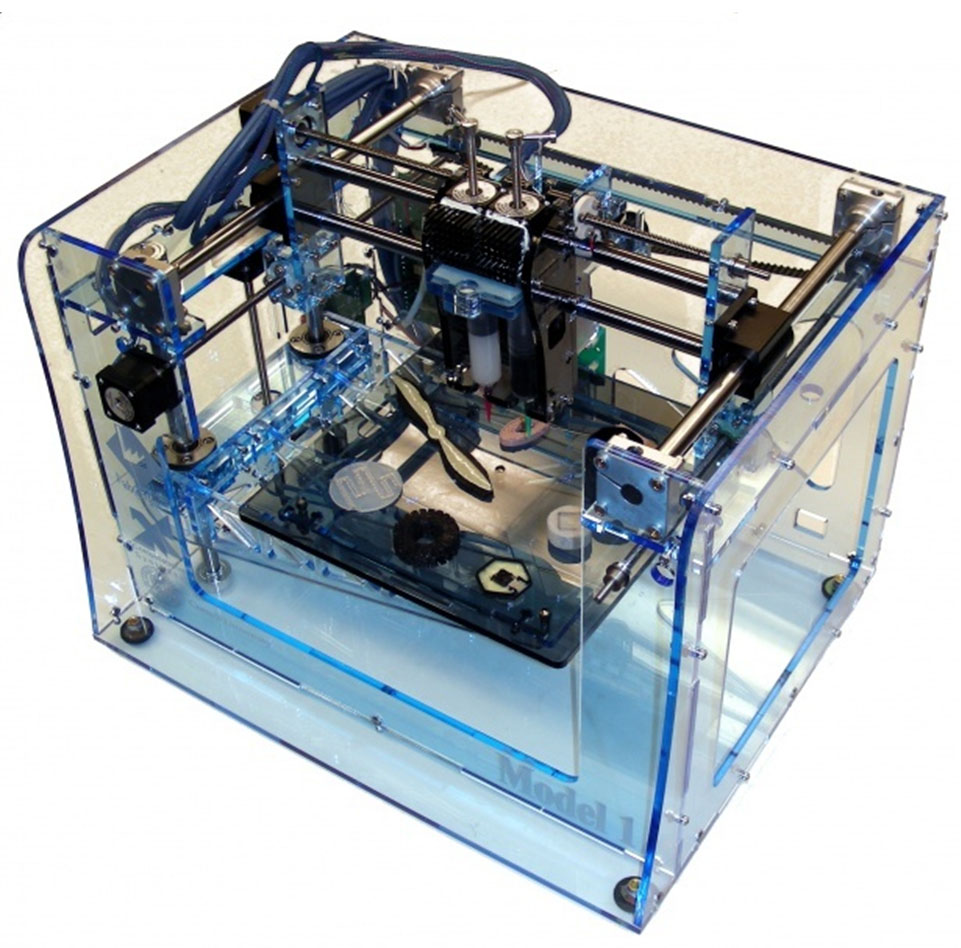
Fab@Home

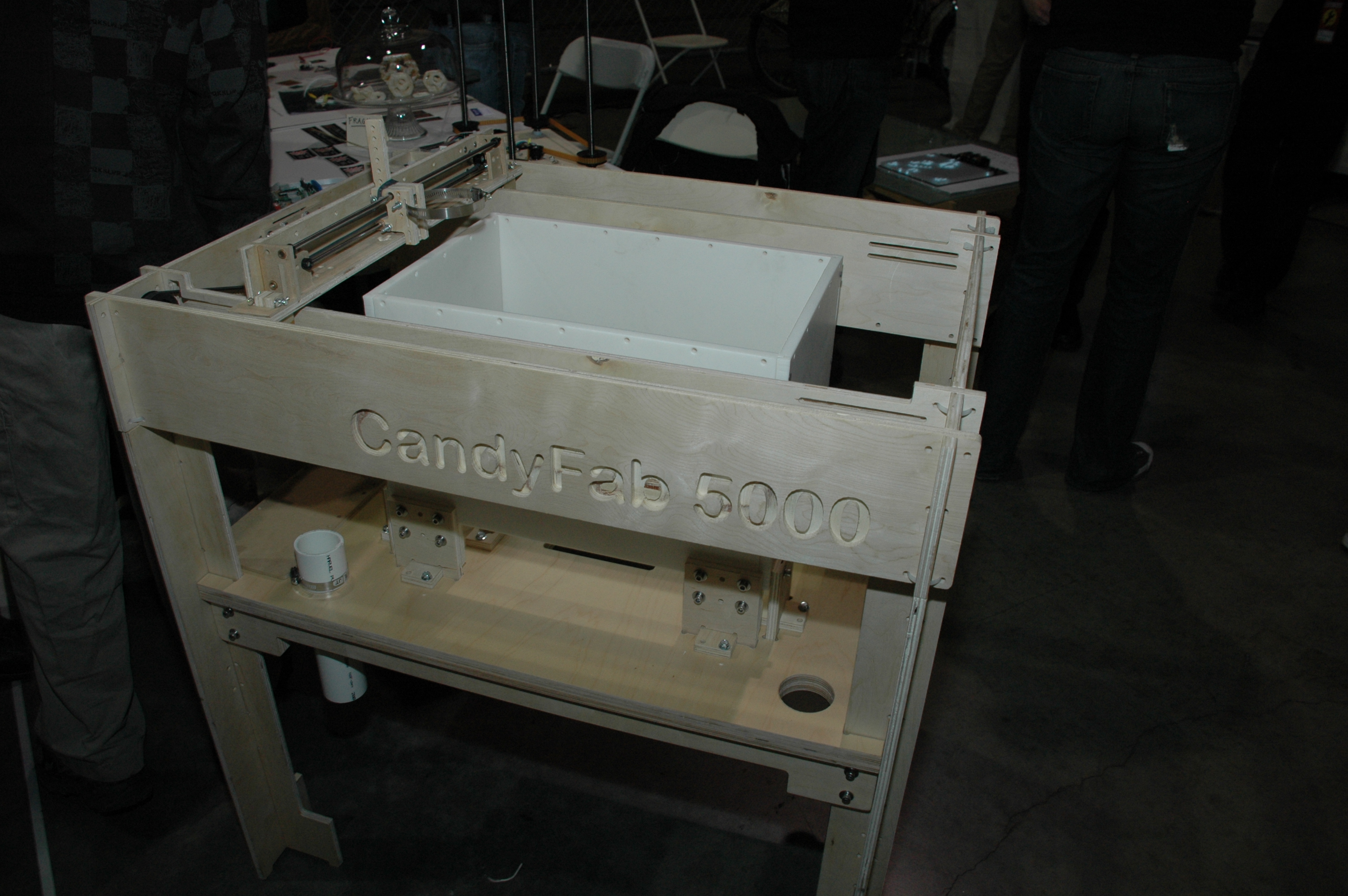
CandyFab

Year	Company/Group Name	Description
2006	Cornell University	Fab@Home, a project led by a group of students, was the first multi-material 3D printer to print food materials such as chocolate, cookie dough and cheese.
2006-2009	Evil Mad Scientist Laboratories	CandyFab was able to print large sugar sculptures by using hot air to selectively melt and fuse sugar grains together.
2012	Choc Edge	Choc Edge was the first commercially available 3D chocolate printer.
2012-2015	biozoon GmbH	PERFORMANCE was a project focused on printing easy to chew and easy to swallow food for seniors.
2013	Modern Meadow	In vitro meat was printed for the first time using a bioprinter.
2014	3D Systems & Hershey's	A chocolate printer that prints various shapes, sizes, and geometries using milk, dark and white chocolate was introduced.
2014	Natural Machines	Foodini, a commercially available printer, was introduced. This printer is able to print a wide range of ingredients and comes with an application that allows users to remotely create designs.
2015	TNO & Barilla	A pasta printer and an annual competition for the best pasta design are introduced.
2018	Novameat	The first meat-free steak made from vegetables that mimics meat texture was printed.
2022	FELIXprinters	FELIXprinter, manufacturer of professional and industrial plastic FDM 3D printers, launches the FELIX FOODprinters range. The single, switch and twin head models are made commercially available.
2023	Revo Foods	The world's first release of a 3D printed food product in supermarkets (of German Rewe Group) is achieved with the launch of "THE FILET - Inspired by Salmon", by Austrian food tech company Revo Foods

== General principles ==
There are three general areas that impact precise and accurate food printing: materials/ingredients (viscosity, powder size), process parameters (nozzle diameter, printing speed, printing distance), and post-processing methods (baking, microwaving, frying).

=== Materials and ingredients ===
The type of food available to print is limited by the printing technique. For an overview of these printing techniques, see the section Printing Techniques below:

==== Extrusion-based printing ingredients ====
Common ingredients used in extrusion-based printing are inherently soft enough to extrude from a syringe/printhead and possess a high enough viscosity to retain a shape. In certain cases, powdered ingredients (protein, sugar, etc.) are added to increase viscosity, e.g. adding flour to water creates a paste that can be printed. Inherently soft materials include:

- purée
- jelly
- frosting
- some kinds of cheese
- mashed potatoes

Certain ingredients that are solid can be used by melting and then extruding the ingredient, e.g. chocolate.

==== Selective laser sintering and binder jetting ingredients ====
Powdered ingredients:

- sugar
- chocolate powder
- protein powder

==== Inkjet printing ingredients ====
Ingredients with low viscosity are used for surface filling:

- sauces (pizza, hot sauce, mustard, ketchup, etc.)
- colored food ink

=== Printing techniques ===
==== Extrusion-based printing ====
Although there are different approaches to extrusion based printing, these approaches follow the same basic procedures. The platform on which food is printed consists of a standard 3-axis stage with a computer controlled extrusion head. This extrusion head pushes food materials through a nozzle typically by way of compressed air or squeezing. The nozzles can vary with respect to what type of food is being extruded or the desired printing speed (typically the smaller the nozzle the longer the food printing will take). As the food is printed, the extrusion head moves along the 3-axis stage printing the desired food. Some printed food requires additional processing such as baking or frying before consumption.

Extrusion based food printers can be purchased for household use, are typically compact in size, and have a low maintenance cost. Comparatively, extrusion based printing provides the user with more material choices. However, these food materials are usually soft, and as a result, makes printing complex food structures difficult. In addition, long fabrication times and deformations due to temperature fluctuations with additional baking or frying require further research and development to overcome.

==== Hot-melt and room temperature ====
In Hot-melt extrusion, the extrusion head heats the food material slightly above the material's melting point. The melted material is then extruded from the head and then solidifies soon thereafter. This allows the material to be easily manipulated into the desired form or model. Foods such as chocolate are used in this technique because of its ability to melt and solidify quickly.

Other food materials do not inherently require a heating element in order to be printed. Food materials such as jelly, frosting, puree, and similar food materials with appropriate viscosity can be printed at room temperature without prior melting.

==== Selective laser sintering ====
Selective Laser Sintering Process

In selective laser sintering, powdered food materials are heated and bonded together forming a solid structure. This process is completed by bonding the powdered material layer by layer with a laser as the heat source. After a layer is completed with the desired areas bonded, it is then covered by a new unbonded layer of powder. Certain parts of this new unbonded layer are heated by the laser in order to bond it with the structure. This process continues in a vertical upwards manner until the desired food model is constructed. After construction, unbonded material can then be recycled and used to print another food model.

Selective laser sintering enables the construction of complex shapes and models and the ability to create different food textures. It is limited by the range of suitable food materials, namely powdered ingredients. Due to this limitation, selective laser sintering has been used primarily for creating sweets/candies.

==== Binder jetting ====
Binder Jetting Process

Similarly to selective laser sintering, binder jetting uses powdered food materials to create a model layer by layer. Instead of using heat to bond the materials together, a liquid binder is used. After bonding the desired areas of a layer, a new layer of powder is then spread over the bonded layer covering it. Certain parts of this new layer are then bonded to the previous layer. The process is repeated until the desired food model is constructed.

As with selective laser sintering, binder jetting enables the construction of complex shapes and models and the ability to create different food textures. Likewise, it is also limited by the range of suitable food materials, namely powdered ingredients.

==== Inkjet printing ====
Inkjet printing is used for surface filling or image decoration. By utilizing gravity, edible food ink is dropped onto the surface of the food, typically a cookie, cake, or other candy. This is a non-contact method, hence the printhead does not touch the food protecting the food from contamination during image filling. The ink droplets may consist of a broad range of colors allowing users to create unique and individualized food images. An issue with inkjet printing is the food materials being incompatible with the ink resulting in no image or high image distortion. Inkjet printers can be purchased for household or commercial use, and industrial printers are suitable for mass production.

==== Multi-printhead and multi-material ====
In multi-printhead and multi-material printing, multiple ingredients are printed at the same time or in succession. There are different ways to support multi-material printing. In one instance, multiple printheads are used to print multiple materials/ingredients, as this can speed up production, efficiency, and lead to interesting design patterns. In another instance, there is one printhead, and when a different ingredient is required, the printer exchanges the material being printed. Multiple materials/ingredients equates to a more diverse range of meals available to print, a broader nutritional range, and is quite common for food printers.

=== Post-processing ===
In the post-processing phase, printed food may require additional steps before consumption. This includes processing activities such as baking, frying, cleaning, etc. This phase can be one of the most critical to 3D printed food, as the printed food needs to be safe for consumption. An additional concern in post processing is the deformation of the printed food due to the strain of these additional processes. Current methods involve trial and error. That is, combining food additives with the materials/ingredients to improve the integrity of complex structures and to ensure the printed structure retains its shape. Additives such as transglutaminase and hydrocolloids have been added to ingredients in order to help retain the printed shape while printing and after cooking.

Additionally, recent research has produced a visual simulation for baking breads, cookies, pancakes and similar materials that consist of dough or batter (mixtures of water, flour, eggs, fat, sugar and leavening agents). By adjusting certain parameters in the simulation, it shows the realistic effect that baking will have on the food. With further research and development, a visual simulation of 3D printed foods being cooked could predict what is vulnerable to deformation.

== Applications ==
=== Personal nutrition ===
Personalized dietary requirements for an individual's nutritional needs has been linked to the prevention of diseases. As such, eating nutritious food is paramount to living a healthy life. 3D printed food can provide the control necessary to put a custom amount of protein, sugar, vitamins, and minerals into the foods we consume.

Another area in customized food is elderly nutrition. The elderly sometimes cannot swallow foods, and as such require a softer pallet. However, these foods are often unappealing causing some individuals not to eat what their bodies' nutritional needs require. Nelson explains that printed food can mimic nutritious foods in puree form for those who cannot consume them normally.3D printed food can provide a soft and aesthetically pleasing food in which the elderly can consume their bodies' dietary requirements.

In October 2019, startup company Nourished 3D prints personalized nutritional gummies from 28 different vitamins. Individuals take a survey, then based on their answers, a personalized nutritional gummy is printed for that individual.

=== Sustainability and solution for hunger ===
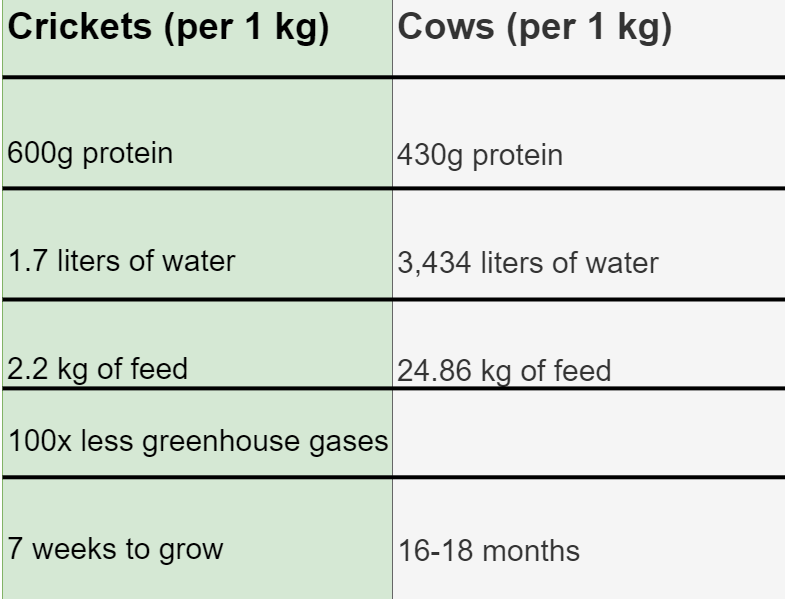
The cost of raising 1kg of cricket meat compared to 1kg of cow meat

As the world's population continues to grow, experts believe that current food supplies will not be able to supply the population. Thus, a sustainable food source is critical. Studies have shown that entomophagy, the consumption of insects, has the potential to sustain a growing population. Insects such as crickets require less feed, less water, and provide around the same amount of protein that chickens, cows, and pigs do. Crickets can be ground into a protein flour. In one study, researchers provide an overview of the process of 3D printing insect flour into foods that do not resemble insects; thus, keeping the nutritional value of the insect intact.

=== Space exploration ===
As humans begin venturing into space for a longer time, the nutritional requirements for maintaining crew health is critical. Currently NASA is exploring ways of integrating 3D printing food into space in order to sustain the crew's dietary requirements. The vision is to 3D print powdered food layers that have a shelf life of 30 years instead of using traditional freeze dried food that have a shelf life of 5 years. In addition to dietary requirements, 3D printing food in space could provide a morale boost, as the astronauts would be able to design custom meals that are aesthetically pleasing.

In September 2019, Russian cosmonauts, along with Israeli startup Aleph Farms, grew meat from cow cells, then 3D printed the cells into steaks.

=== Meat bioprinting ===
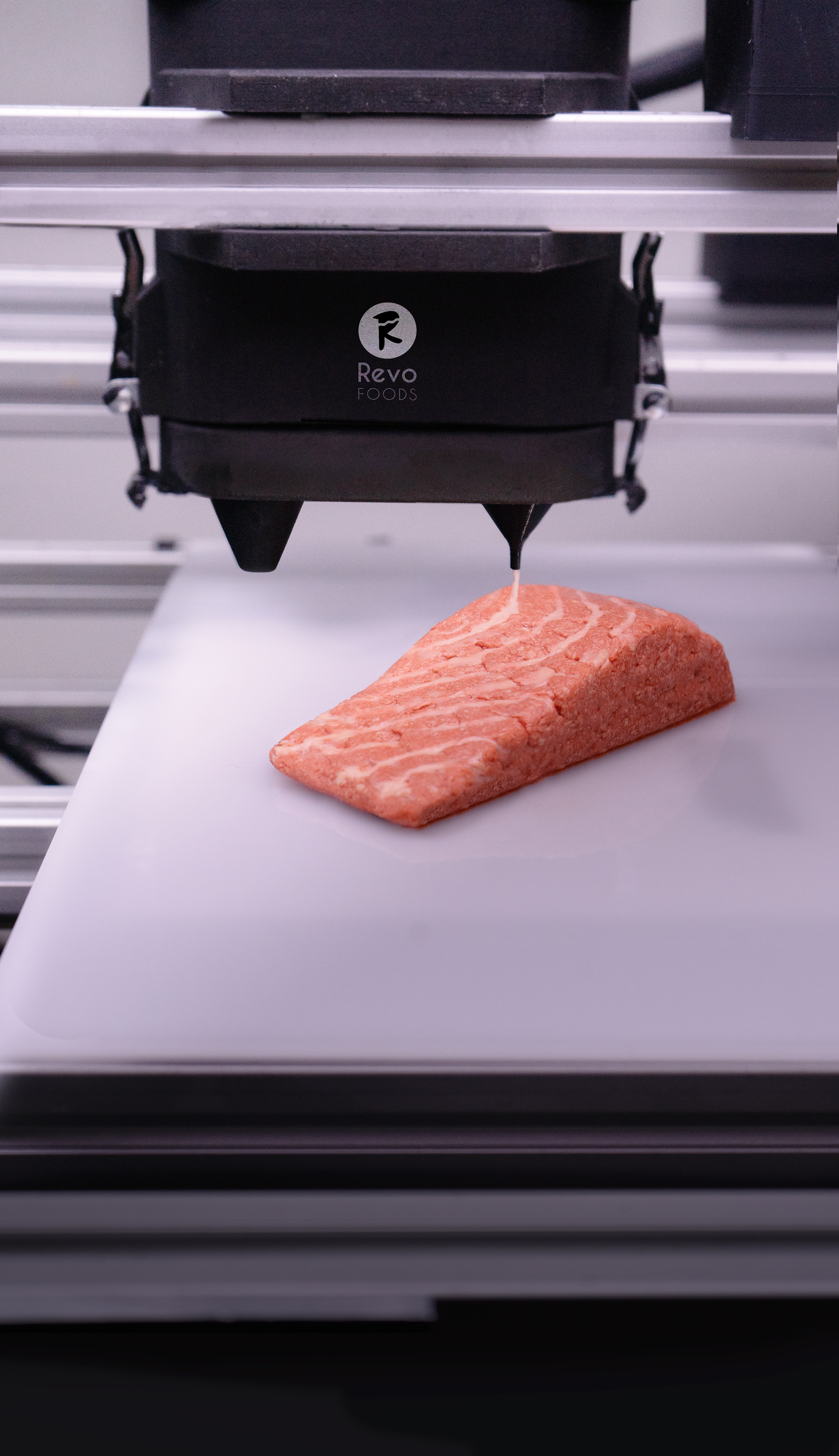
A plant-based salmon filet alternative by Austrian company Revo Foods, which was produced with 3D food printing in a multi-print-head setup, combining mycoprotein and plant-based fat to recreate the structure of conventional salmon filets.

Livestock farming is one of the top contributors to deforestation, land degradation, water pollution and desertification. Among other reasons, this has led to the new promising technology of meat bioprinting. One alternative to livestock farming is cultured meat, also known as lab-grown meat. Cultured meat is produced by taking a small biopsy from animals, extracting the myosatellite cells and adding growth serum to multiply the cells. The resulting product is then used as a material for bioprinting meat. The post-processing phase, among other steps, includes adding flavour, vitamins and iron to the product. Yet another alternative is printing a meat analogue. Novameat, a Spanish startup has been able to print a plant-based steak and mimic the texture and appearance of real meat. In 2023, Austrian food tech company Revo Foods launched a 3D printed salmon filet alternative based on mycoprotein in Supermarkets of German REWE Group, which became the first 3D printed meat/seafood alternative available in supermarkets worldwide, marking an important milestone towards increased availability of 3D printed food items.

=== Creative food design ===
Food presentation and food appearance customization for individuals is a big trend in the food industry. So far food customization and creative designs have required hand-made skills, which results in low production rate and high cost. 3D food printing can overcome this problem by providing the necessary tools for creative food design even for home users. 3D food printing has enabled some intricate designs which cannot be accomplished with traditional food manufacturing. Brand logos, text, signatures, pictures can now be printed on some food products like pastries and coffee. Complex geometric shapes have also been printed, mainly using sugar. With 3D printing, chefs can now turn their visual inspirations into signature culinary creations. Another benefit is being able to print nutritious meals in shapes that appeal to children.

=== Reduced food waste ===
Worldwide, one third of the total food produced for consumption, around 1.6 billion tons per year, goes to waste. Food waste happens during processing, distribution and consumption. 3D food printing is a very promising way of reducing food waste during the phase of consumption, by utilizing food products like meat off-cuts, distorted fruits and vegetables, sea food by-products and perishables. These products can be processed in a suitable form for printing. Upprinting Food, a Dutch startup, has been blending and combining different ingredients from food waste to create purees which are then used as materials for 3D printing. Chefs are also creating different dishes from leftover food using 3D food printers.

== Challenges ==
=== Structure ===
Unlike traditionally prepared food, the variety of food that can be manufactured using 3D printing is limited by the physical characteristics of the materials. Food materials are generally much softer than the weakest plastic used in 3D printing, making the printed structures very fragile. So far, most studies use trial and error as an approach to overcoming this challenge, but scientists are working on developing new methods that are able to predict the behavior of different materials during the printing process. These methods are developed by analyzing the rheological properties of the materials and their relation to the printing stability.

=== Design ===
When designing a 3D model for a food product, the physical and geometrical limitations of the printing materials should be taken into account. This makes the designing process a very complex task and so far there is no available software that accounts for that. Building such software is also a complex task due to the vast variety of food materials. Considering that personal users who incorporate 3D food printing in their kitchens represent a significant part of the overall users, the design of the software interface adds to the complexity. The interface of such software should be simple and have high usability while still providing enough features and customization options for the user without causing cognitive overload.

=== Speed ===
The current speed of 3D printing food could be sufficient for home use, but the process is very slow for mass production. Simple designs take 1 to 2 minutes, detailed designs take 3 to 7 minutes, and more intricate designs take even longer. The speed of printing food is tightly correlated to the rheological properties of the materials. Research shows that high printing speed results in low fidelity samples due to the dragging effect, while very low speed causes instability in material deposition.

In order for 3D food printing to find its way to the food industry, the printing speed needs improvement or the cost of such technology should be affordable enough for companies to operate several printers.

=== Multi-material printing ===
The color, flavor and texture of food are of crucial importance when fabricating an edible product, thus in most cases it is required that a food printer supports multi-material printing. The current available 3D food printers are limited to using a few different materials due to the challenge of developing multiple extruder capabilities. This limits the variety of food products that can be 3D printed, leaving out complex dishes that require a lot of different materials.

=== Safety ===
When 3D printing food, safety is very crucial. A food printer must ensure safety along the entire path taken by the food material. Due to the possibility of food getting stuck somewhere along the path, bacteria accumulation is a major concern. Microbial stability is a crucial parameter of the quality of the printed food, thus it needs to be addressed both during the design of the printer and during the printing process. On the other hand, the materials that come into contact with the food may not be as significant of a concern since high quality printers use stainless steel and BPA-free materials.

=== Copyright ===
Existing food products in the market such as chocolates in various shapes could easily be scanned and the obtained 3D models could be used to replicate those products. These 3D models could then be disseminated via Internet leading to copyright infringement. There are laws regulating copyright issues but it is not clear whether they will be sufficient to cover all aspects of a field like 3D food printing.

== See also ==
- 3D Printing
- Multi-material 3D printing
- 3D bioprinting
- 3D drug printing
- 3D Scanning
- 3D Modelling
- Fused Deposition Modeling (FDM)
- Selective Laser Sintering
- Inkjet Printing
- IoT
- Fab@Home
- Transglutaminase
- Hydrocolloids
- Viscosity
- Edible ink printing
