= Z Corporation =

3D printing and imaging company

3D Systems ZPrinters
- Genre: 3D Imaging/Printing/Prototyping
- Founded: 1986
- Headquarters: Rock Hill, South Carolina,, United States

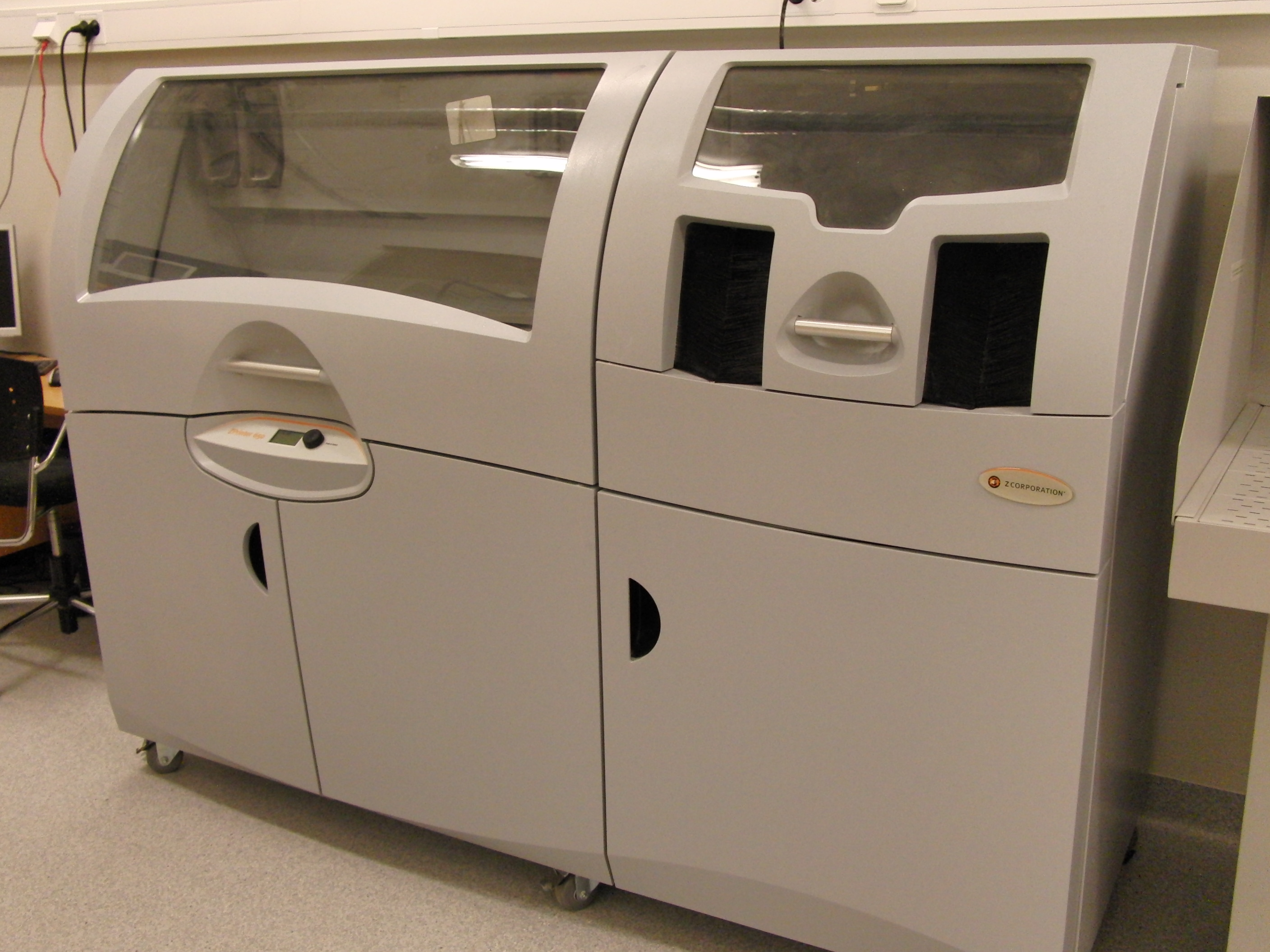
ZPrinter 650 – A full-color 3D printer by Z Corporation using powder-based binder jetting technology

Z Corporation (commonly abbreviated Z Corp.) is a company that makes 3D printing and scanning technologies. It was founded in December 1994 by Marina Hatsopoulos, Walter Bornhorst, James Bredt and Tim Anderson, based on a technology developed at MIT under the direction of Professor Ely Sachs. The Company was sold to Contex Holding in August 2005, and was ultimately acquired by 3D Systems on January 3, 2012.

== History and background ==
In 1993, ZPrinting was developed in Building 20 at the Massachusetts Institute of Technology as a new 3D printing technology. ZPrinting relates to the z axis, and adds depth to the other 2 axes x and y, as does 3D printing. In many other rapid prototyping processes, the part to be printed is built up from many thin cross sections of the 3D model. In ZPrinters, a printing head which is similar to inkjet moves across a bed of powder, selectively depositing a liquid binding material in the shape of the section. The operator is required to spread a fresh layer of powder across the top of the model, and repeat the process. When the model is complete, unbound powder is automatically removed. Parts can be built on a ZPrinter at a rate of approximately 1 vertical inch per hour.

In 1997 Z Corp released what at the time was the fastest available 3-D printer, becoming an early leader in the industry.

In January 2012 Z Corp was acquired by 3D Systems for $137 million USD.

== Color printing ==
Zprinters can print components in full color, using inkjet technology from the 2 dimensional printing industry. The color science has been adapted for use in 3 dimensions. The color spectrum of the most capable machines is full cmyk, or up to 6 million colors. Due to the wide range of color choices, the machines are capable of printing gradient color patterns, signifying how the machines differ from other "color" 3D printing systems. Color can be used to simulate the appearance of other materials (as in architectural models or product prototypes), to highlight surface structures or add annotations to models (as in models used to plan surgeries), or to display the results of structural analyses (such as finite element analysis) directly on the model surface.

Zprinters originally gained recognition through applications in the medical and architectural industry. Recently, they have gained popularity for creating 3D printed models of people from color 3D-scans, avatars from video games (Space Engineers, World of Warcraft, Assassin's Creed), and artistic and realistic sculptures.

As of 2016, 3D Systems rebranded the Z Corp's 3D printing technology as Color Jet. Quickparts.com, the service bureau owned by 3D Systems, offers service from this printing technology.

== Printer modifications ==
In 2018, Scott Ziv modified a Z Corp Z402 (the first commercially available machine to use binder jetting) to use selective laser sintering to create 3D objects by fusing glitter.

== See also ==
- 3D printing
- 3D scanning
