= ExOne =

ExOne (formerly The ExOne Company) was an American industrial additive manufacturing company that developed and manufactured binder jetting 3D printing systems for metal and sand applications.

The company originated as a spin-off from machining and automation supplier Extrude Hone. ExOne became a publicly traded company in 2013, listing on Nasdaq under the symbol XONE, and was acquired by Desktop Metal in November 2021.

== History ==
=== Origins ===
Industry coverage traced ExOne's origins to Extrude Hone's ProMetal activities related to metal 3D printing and the commercialization of binder jetting systems.

PIM International reported that Extrude Hone installed a ProMetal RTS300 system for building metal parts at Motorola in 1999, describing it as an early industrial deployment of metal binder jetting technology.

ExOne was later established as a separate company to commercialize these systems and expand their industrial use in metal and sand 3D printing.

=== Initial public offering ===
In January 2013, ExOne filed to raise up to US$75 million in an initial public offering and stated that it expected to list on Nasdaq under the symbol XONE.

The company announced that its IPO was priced in February 2013 and that its shares began trading on Nasdaq on February 7, 2013, under the symbol XONE.

=== Acquisition by Desktop Metal ===
On August 11, 2021, Desktop Metal announced an agreement to acquire ExOne in an all-stock transaction with a preliminary valuation of approximately US$575 million.

The acquisition was completed in November 2021, with a final transaction value of approximately US$561 million, and ExOne became a subsidiary of Desktop Metal.

Following completion of the transaction, ExOne's common stock was delisted from Nasdaq.

== Technology ==
ExOne manufactured industrial 3D printing systems based primarily on the binder jetting process, in which a liquid binder is selectively deposited onto a powder bed to form parts layer by layer.

Academic literature has described binder jet 3D printing as having been developed at the Massachusetts Institute of Technology in the early 1990s and patented in 1993.

== See also ==
- Voxeljet
- Desktop Metal
- Binder jetting
- 3D printing
- Additive manufacturing
