= Virtual and Physical Prototyping =

Scientific journal on virtual and rapid prototyping

- Discipline: Additive manufacturing, Prototyping, Engineering
- Language: English
- Edited by: Chee Kai Chua

Publication details
- History: Since 2006
- Publisher: Taylor & Francis
- Frequency: Continuous
- Open access: Yes
- License: Creative Commons Attribution
- Impact factor: 9.8 (2025)

Standard abbreviations
- ISO 4: Virtual Phys. Prototyp.

Indexing
- ISSN: 1745-2759 (print); 1745-2767 (web)
- LCCN: 2005264578
- OCLC no.: 69104644

Links
- Journal homepage; Online access; Online archive

Virtual and Physical Prototyping is a peer-reviewed open-access scientific journal covering research on virtual and rapid prototyping, including additive manufacturing (AM), 4D printing and smart materials, multi-material and hybrid manufacturing, bioprinting and biofabrication, advanced manufacturing processes and materials, quality control and AM standards, data analytics and artificial intelligence in AM, and nature-inspired designs via AM. It was established in 2006 and is published by Taylor & Francis. It has been fully open access since 2023.

== Abstracting and indexing ==
The journal is abstracted and indexed in:

- Cambridge Scientific Abstracts
- Directory of Open Access Journals
- EBSCO Databases
- Ei Compendex
- Embase
- Inspec
- Science Citation Index Expanded
- Scopus

According to the Journal Citation Reports, the journal has a 2025 impact factor of 9.8.

== See also ==
- 3D bioprinting
- 3D concrete printing
- 3D food printing
- 3D printing
- Stereolithography
