= Laser sintering of gold =

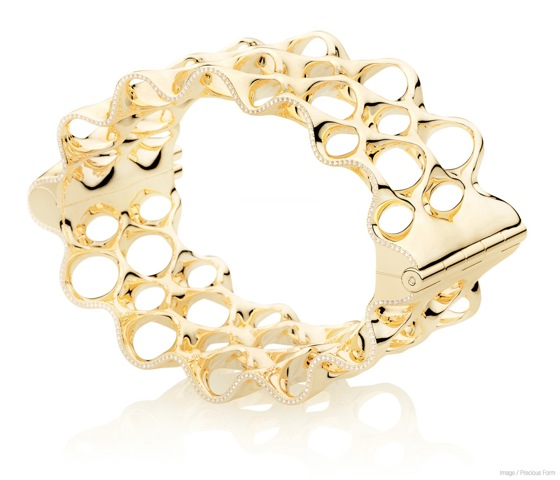
Design by Towe Norlén

Laser sintering of gold is a jewellery manufacturing technique first developed by Towe Norlén and Lena Thorsson.

Laser sintering of gold starts with gold powder, fine as flour. A laser beam sinters (melts) the gold flour locally in an extremely small point, and any shape may be ‘drawn’ precisely with the laser beam, in three dimensions. When the gold object is finished, it is gently brushed from the leftover gold flour, in much the same way as in an archaeological dig.

The result is a gold object of virtually any shape, and with higher quality (greater surface density) gold, than that possible to achieve with casting. Moreover, laser sintering circumvents the weakening and surface-deforming mounting process, because the item of jewellery is manufactured in a single piece. Also, jewellery design may be expanded and individualised, as in principle any shape is possible, which facilitates uniqueness and personalized design.
