= Voxeljet =

German manufacturer of 3D printers

voxeljet AG
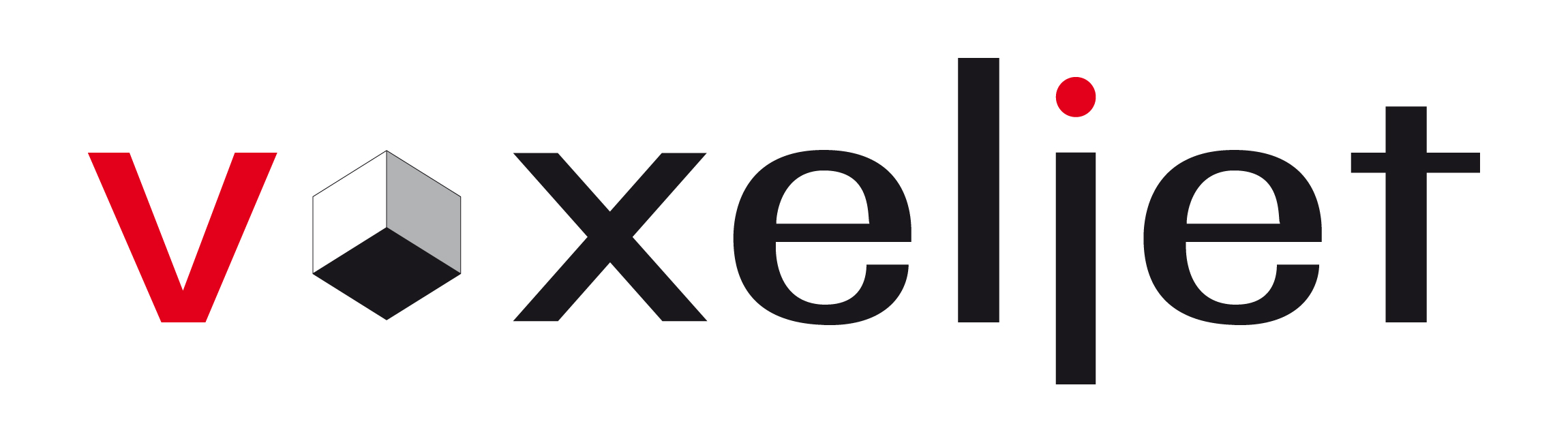
- Type: Aktiengesellschaft (AG)
- Traded as: OTCMKTS: VJTTY
- ISIN: US92912L2060
- Founded: 1999
- Headquarters: Friedberg (Bavaria), Germany
- Area served: Worldwide
- Key people: Rudolf Franz, CEO; Dr. Ingo Ederer, Prof. Dr. Joachim Heinzl, Rainer Höchsmann [Founders]
- Revenue: ▼€33.3 million (2023)
- Number of employees: ▲249 (October 2024)
- Website: www.voxeljet.com

voxeljet AG, which is based in Friedberg (Bayern) near Augsburg (Germany), is a manufacturer of industrial 3D printing systems. The company has been listed on the Nasdaq since 2020, and previously listed on the New York Stock Exchange since its IPO in 2013. In April 2024, the company delisted from Nasdaq and now trades OTC (OTCMKTS:VJTTY). Besides the development and distribution of printing systems, voxeljet AG also operates service centers for the on-demand manufacture of molds and models for metal casting in Germany, the USA and China. These products are manufactured with the help of a generative production method based on 3D CAD data (also referred to as "3D printing").

== History ==
=== Beginnings ===
voxeljet AG traces its roots back to the year 1995, with the first successful drop-dosing of UV adhesives. The first 3D printing trials were conducted at the Precision Engineering department of the Technical University of Munich as part of the "Generation of 3D structures" project. In 1996, Dr. Ingo Ederer and Rainer Höchsmann participated in the first Munich business plan competition and was awarded his first patent in 1998. The first sand molds were printed in the same year.

=== Formation of the company ===
Generis GmbH, the predecessor of today's voxeljet AG, was founded on 5 May 1999 by Dr. Ingo Ederer, Rainer Höchsmann and Prof. Dr. Joachim Heinzl at the Technical University of Munich. The purpose of the company was the development of new generative processes for the production of cast and plastic components. The company started its operations at the Technical University of Munich with four employees. Shortly afterwards, it refurbished and relocated into the premises in Augsburg. In the year 2002, the company completed its first orders for the delivery of sand-based printers to BMW AG and Daimler AG, before opening the service center in Augsburg in the year 2003. In the same year, Bayern Kapital GmbH, the Startkapital Fonds Augsburg and Franz Industriebeteiligungen AG joined as new shareholders.

=== Establishment phase ===
The first VX800 system was sold to Alphaform AG in 2005. This was followed by the sale of the first VX500 to the University of Rostock two years later. In 2008, voxeljet technology GmbH received an award as part of the Bavarian Innovation Prize from the hands of Bavarian premier Günther Beckstein. The company celebrated its 10-year anniversary one year later.

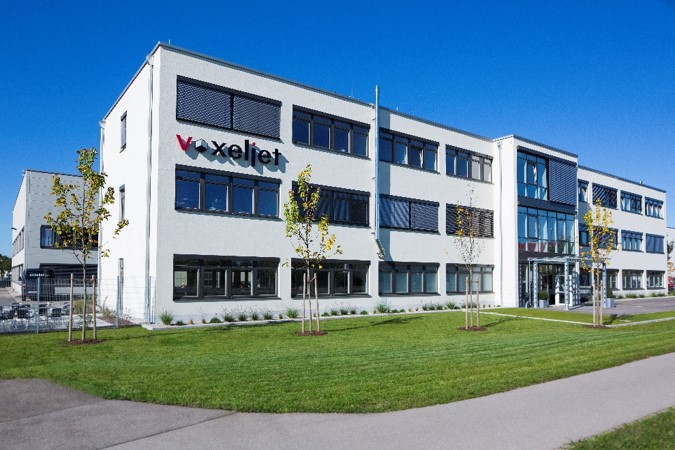
voxeljet Friedberg

In the spring of 2010, voxeljet moved into a new administration building and production halls in Friedberg. During the same year, voxeljet was added to the list of Germany's top 100 innovators and received the "Top 100" seal of approval.

=== Growth phase ===
In the year 2011, voxeljet introduced a series of technical innovations. In April 2011, the company opened up a new dimension of generative production methods with the VX4000 3D printing system. This system makes it possible to produce objects with a size of 4 x 2 x 1 meters at a build speed that is up to three times faster than earlier systems, while maintaining the same resolution. At the international trade fair for foundry technologies ‘’GIFA’’, voxeljet introduced the world's first continuous 3D printer, the VXC800. The development of this continuous 3D printing technology represented the manufacturing of molds and models without tools. This machine generation runs the process steps "building" and "unpacking" in parallel, without having to interrupt system operations. Therefore, this printing system represents an important step towards industrial series production on the basis of a generative production process. In the same year, voxeljet celebrated the global premiere of its 3D printer VX1000 at EuroMold, the trade fair for tooling and mold-making, design and product development in Frankfurt am Main. By combining high performance and a large build space, this printing system was able to meet the growing requirements of industry. In addition to these system innovations, the company also presented the newly developed material system Polypor type C in the year 2011. It allows voxeljet to meet customer demand for pure white plastic models. Moreover, this material also satisfies higher requirements regarding the stability and surface properties of the models. A year later in 2012, the first VX1000 printing system was sold to the British company Propshop (Model Makers) Ltd.. It was the fifth voxeljet system that was in use in the United Kingdom. The movie industry opened a completely new customer market for voxeljet. In the year 2012, voxeljet introduced its smallest system, the VX200, to the market. This printing system uses the same method as the larger series, but is very compact and easy to operate.

=== IPO ===
In the year 2013, the company went ahead with its IPO on the New York Stock Exchange. To this end, voxeljet technology GmbH was converted into a stock corporation that now operates as voxeljet AG. On 17 October 2013, voxeljet placed 6.5 million ADS on the NYSE at an issue price of US$13. Five American Depositary Receipt corresponded to one share. The IPO enabled voxeljet AG to take in US$64.5 million after deduction of the price discount granted to the issuing banks and issue costs. Six months after the IPO, voxeljet AG generated another US$41.1 million as part of a capital increase, after deduction of the price discount granted to the issuing banks and issue costs. In the process, the company issued another three million American Depositary Shares at the New York Stock Exchange at a unit price of US$15.

=== Globalization ===
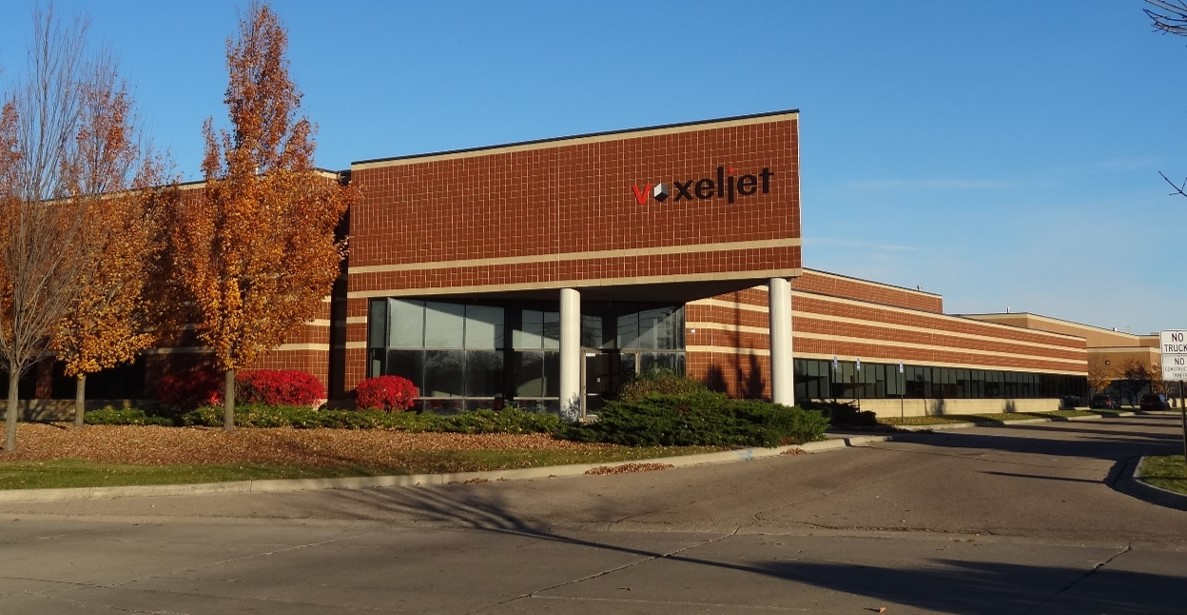
voxeljet Canton

To add to its global network of sales partners voxeljet AG began to set up its own international locations in the year 2014. On 1 October 2014, voxeljet AG took over the British company Propshop (Model Makers) Ltd., thus establishing its first location outside Germany. With the takeover, Propshop became a wholly owned subsidiary of voxeljet AG. The company, which specializes in the film and entertainment industry, had already gained experience with voxeljet printing systems when it purchased the VX1000 in the year 2012. In the same year, voxeljet AG founded a new company in the USA. In January 2015, voxeljet began to operate a service center for the on-demand production of molds and models in Canton (Michigan), with the goal of reaching a printing capacity similar to the capacity at the home location in Friedberg by the end of 2016. In December 2015 voxeljet announced a joint venture with Suzhou Meimai Fast Manufacturing Technology in China. The joint venture shall be called voxeljet China Ltd. and will be headquartered in the city of Suzhou, near Shanghai. At the same time voxeljet AG established voxeljet India Pvt. Ltd.

== Technology and process ==
=== Process ===
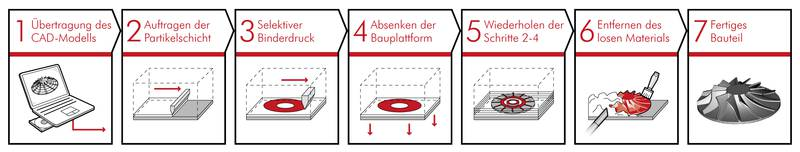
Portrayal of 3D printing processes of voxeljet printing systems

The binder jetting technology was first developed at the Massachusetts Institute of Technology in 1993 and is generally known as the "Powder bed and inkjet head 3D printing". As usual in the additive manufacturing processes, the part to be printed is built up from many thin cross sections of the 3D model. An inkjet print head moves across a bed of powder, simultaneously putting down a liquid binding material. After that, a thin layer of powder is extended across the completed section and the process is repeated several times with each layer adhering to the last.

In 2017, voxeljet introduced its High Speed Sintering (HSS) technology. HSS is a powder-based 3D printing process that produces functional plastic parts from materials such as polyamide 12 (PA12) or thermoplastic polyurethane (TPU). The technology employs an ink jetting process that starts by spreading a thin layer of polymer powder onto a build platform. An inkjet printhead then selectively jets an infrared-absorbing ink into the areas of the build where the part is to be produced. An infrared lamp then passes over the layer, fusing the printed areas while the unprinted powder remains loose and acts as a support material during the build. This process is repeated layer by layer until the entire build volume is filled. After cooling, the parts can be unpacked.

In 2019, voxeljet announced a joint project with the Spanish foundry equipment manufacturer LORAMENDI S COOP. The project, called "Industrialization of Core Printing (ICP)", aimed to serial-additive manufacture water jacket cores at the BMW light metal foundry in Landshut, Germany. The project was completed in 2023.

In 2021, voxeljet, together with GE Renewable Energy and the Fraunhofer IGZV Institute, announced a joint project that aligns with the U.S. strategy for clean power generation. The project involves the development of a new 3D printer that prints sand molds for the casting of parts for offshore wind turbines and water turbines. In 2023, the project received funding from the U.S. Department of Energy.

=== Application area ===
The voxeljet process is particularly well-suited for the production of molds or models for metal casting applications in small series, such as prototypes, individual parts, props, investment casting or sand casting. In addition, the method is used for design samples, art and architecture components as well as in the aviation and aerospace industry, automotive industry, research and medicine and in the film and entertainment industry. In High Speed Sintering, functional parts can directly be 3D printed.

=== Materials ===
voxeljet offers two plastic materials based on PMMA particles bound by different resins. The Polypor B binder, available as a voxeljet service and for system customers in Europe, is ideal for parts that are true to detail and which require a high degree of edge sharpness, resolution and green compact strength. The Polypor C binder, on the other hand, lends itself to simplified burn-out processes in investment casting and for architectural models.

The sand types are selected individually for each order depending on the geometry and application purpose. voxeljet uses different sands with different granulations. The grain size that is used will decide the surface finish of the cast result. The most commonly used sand is made of quartz and is available in the granulations 0.14 mm, 0.19 mm and 0.25 mm. Also offered is the more temperature-resistant kerphalite sand, which is suited for especially complex geometries and internal cores for steel casting.

In High Speed Sintering, functional parts can be manufactured in PA12, PP, TPU, PEBA and EVA based polymers.

== 3D printing systems ==
Image	Model	Material class	Build space dimensions	Specifications/Features
Industrial 3D printer for polymer sintering	VX1000 HSS	Polymer Sintering	1,000 mm × 540 mm × 400 mm	Large-scale polymer sintering; Unprinted particle material is recyclable; Layer thickness of 100 μm and resolution of 360 dpi; Piezo print head system (print resolution 360 dpi)
Industrial 3D printer for polymer sintering	VX200	Polymer Sintering	290 mm × 140 mm × 180 mm	For material development, e.g. in universities or corporate R&D departments; Small scale production
Voxeljet VX1000	VX1000	Sand/PMMA/PDB	1060 mm × 600 mm × 500 mm	High-performance machine; High-performance print head with a resolution of up to 600 dpi; Environmentally-friendly process due to compatibility with inorganic binder; Ability to print molds with complex geometries and undercuts; Effective continuous operations due to rugged design and high-quality components; Suitable for all voxeljet particulate materials
Voxeljet VX2000	VX2000	Sand/PDB	2000 mm × 1000 mm × 1000 mm	Fast and economical manufacturing of large components and small batches; Open source material options; Integrated material handling system; Industrial 3D printer for 24/7 usage; Efficient operation through rugged design and high-quality components
Voxeljet VX4000	VX4000	Sand	4000 mm × 2000 mm × 1000 mm	One of the largest 3D printing systems worldwide; Continuous operation with multiple building platforms; Variable use of build space for individual applications; Fast and economical manufacture of large components and batches

== See also ==
- List of 3D printer manufacturers
