= Carl R. Deckard =

American inventor (1961–2019)

Carl Robert Deckard, Ph.D, ME (1961 - December 23, 2019) was an American inventor, teacher, and businessman, best known for inventing and developing Selective Laser Sintering (SLS), a method of 3D printing. He died at the age of 58, on 23 December 2019.

== Career ==
Deckard initially came up with the idea for SLS as an undergraduate at the University of Texas at Austin (UT Austin). He continued developing the technology as a Masters and PhD student with the help of Dr. Joe Beaman, a professor at UT Austin. After several years of trial-and-error, Deckard's machine was capable of manufacturing real parts. He licensed the technology from UT Austin and co-founded Desk Top Manufacturing (DTM) Corp. in 1987. DTM Corp. specialized in rapid prototyping and manufacturing systems for manufacturers and service bureaus. DTM Corp. was acquired by 3D Systems in 2001 at a $45 million valuation. Deckard became an engineering professor at Clemson University after DTM's acquisition. After three and a half years, Deckard returned to Austin to work on the Deckard Engine, a four-stroke engine aimed at replacing emission-emitting two-stroke engines in small, hand-held products.

The majority of Deckard's work was in the additive manufacturing industry. In 2012, Deckard co-founded Structured Polymers LLC, a company that develops novel polymers for SLS machines.

=== Patents ===
- Selective Laser Sintering with Assisted Powder Handling (U.S. 4,938,816)
- Method and Apparatus for Producing Parts by Selective Sintering (U.S. 4,863,538)
- Multiple Material Systems for Selective Beam Sintering (U.S. 4,944,817)
