= 3D printed medication =

3D printing of customized medication

A 3D printed medication (also called 3D printed medicine, 3D printed pharmaceutical, or 3D printed drug) is a customized medication created using 3D printing techniques, such as 3D printed tablets. It allows for precise control over the composition and dosage of drugs, enabling the production of personalized medicine tailored to an individual's specific needs, such as age, weight, and medical condition. This approach can be used to improve the effectiveness of drug therapies and to reduce side effects.

== Applications ==
=== Pharmaceutical tablets ===
The most common application of 3D printing in pharmaceuticals is the production of tablets and capsules. 3D printing offers precise dosing, the ability to design tablets with improved release profiles, and the capability to combine multiple medications into a single tablet. Ongoing development primarily focuses on 3D printing drugs for pediatric, geriatric, psychiatry, and neurology patients, where dosage adjustments are often necessary based on a patient's condition, and patient adherence is a challenge. The first 3D-printed tablet to receive FDA approval was Spritam (levetiracetam), an anti-epileptic medication.

Various designs have been invented to enable different drug release profiles. 3D printing protocols have been developed to print tablets with immediate-release and modified release profiles. The order and geometric orientation of layers in a tablet, the shape of tablets, and the excipients used determine the release profile of the active pharmaceutical ingredients.

=== Drug-functionalized materials ===
In addition to 3D drug printing which aims at printing drug formulations, 3D printing can be used to fabricate materials functionalized by drugs, e.g., antibiotics or angiogenic agents. This area, which is a part of biomaterials engineering, aims at products such as adhesive patches for wound healing, hydrogel, and non-hydrogel implants, rather than tablets or capsules. As such, this field is distinct from 3D drug printing discussed above.

== Techniques ==
The techniques used for printing medication typically involve various additive manufacturing methods, including:

- Binder jet
- Fused filament fabrication
- Melt extrusion deposition
- Selective laser sintering
- Semi-solid extrusion
- Stereolithography

These techniques offer various advantages and can be tailored to specific drug formulations and manufacturing requirements.

=== Binder jet ===
The binder jet approach begins by spreading a fine layer of powder onto the platform using a roller. Subsequently, a removable printhead sprays droplets, selectively binding the powder to create the desired structure. The platform is then lowered, and a new layer of powder is spread while the printhead continues to deposit droplets. This layer-by-layer printing method repeats until the entire object is formed. Finally, the finished products are extracted, the excess powder is removed, and any necessary post-processing is performed. The printing inks typically contain only the binder, while the powder bed contains the Active Pharmaceutical Ingredient (API) and other supplementary ingredients. In some cases, the API can be introduced into the powder bed as a solution or in the form of nanoparticle suspension. It's worth noting that BJ-3DP technology is not limited to APIs with high water solubility. For APIs that are poorly soluble in water, their solubility can be enhanced through pre-treatment methods, although there is relatively limited research in this area.

=== Fused deposition modeling ===
Fused deposition modeling technology was made available to the public domain in 2009, and is currently a commonly used approach to 3D drug printing. The process begins with a polymer filament that incorporates the drug. This filament is fed through a high-temperature nozzle by two rollers, controlled by computer software to print. Once one layer is complete, the printing platform initiates the next layer. This sequence continues until the entire printing process is finished.

=== Melt extrusion deposition ===
Melt extrusion deposition 3D printing leverages a combination of hot melt extrusion and fused deposition modeling technologies. The process is initiated by introducing active pharmaceutical ingredients (API) and various excipients into separate feeding devices. These materials are then subjected to heat and intense shearing within the hot melt extrusion system, resulting in a uniform molten state. Subsequently, this molten material is delivered to the hot melt extrusion module. The printing stations coordinate their actions, allowing for the amalgamation of diverse molten materials, which are then deposited layer by layer onto the printing platform. Precise control of pressure and temperature results in the creation of 3D-printed preparations that closely replicate the desired structure.

=== Selective laser sintering ===
Selective laser sintering (SLS) uses powder as a raw material and a laser as energy input to fuse particles together. This technique has been investigated for the production of medication in various studies with no introduction to the market so far. Since most pharmaceutical substances are powders at room temperature, SLS requires no material preparation steps. Moreover, basically no post-processing is needed due to the dry printing conditions and lack of supporting structures. Disadvantages are the high chance of cross-contamination when printing different substances in the same printer, as well as high print failure rate with substances that are not optimized for SLS printing.

=== Semi-solid solid extrusion ===
Semi-solid solid extrusion (SSE) is an additive manufacturing technique that builds objects layer by layer. In SSE, an extrusion head follows a predefined path, depositing semi-solid material to create each layer, and gradually stacking them to form the final product. SSE is conceptually similar to Fused Deposition Modeling (FDM), with a key distinction: the material used in SSE is semi-solid at room temperature. This means that precise temperature control is essential during the printing process to prevent excessive softening of the material due to high temperatures, ensuring it maintains its intended shape.

To facilitate this process, a dedicated syringe contains the semi-solid print material. The extrusion of the material can be accomplished using various methods, such as pneumatic pressure, mechanical energy, or an electromagnetic system. This technology allows for the creation of complex structures and customized objects by precisely controlling the deposition of semi-solid material layer by layer.

=== Stereolithography ===
Stereolithography (SLA) technology operates on the principle of photopolymerization, utilizing laser scanning to solidify liquid resin and build 3D-printed objects layer by layer. The printing process can be configured to work either from the top to the bottom or vice versa, depending on the printer's setup. To initiate printing, the liquid photopolymer resin is poured into a reservoir, and a scanning mirror focuses a laser beam onto the resin's surface, creating a focused light spot. This light spot solidifies the resin within its swept area. Once a scanning layer is completed, the printing platform lowers by one layer's height, and a squeegee levels the resin surface for the subsequent layer of printing. This process continues until the object is fully formed. Afterward, the finished product is extracted, and any excess resin and support structures are removed. SLA is particularly useful for thermolabile drugs.

== See also ==
- Pharmaceutics – Science of the properties of medicines
- Pharmacokinetics – Branch of pharmacology that studies how an organism affects a drug
