= Powder bed and inkjet head 3D printing =

3D printing technique

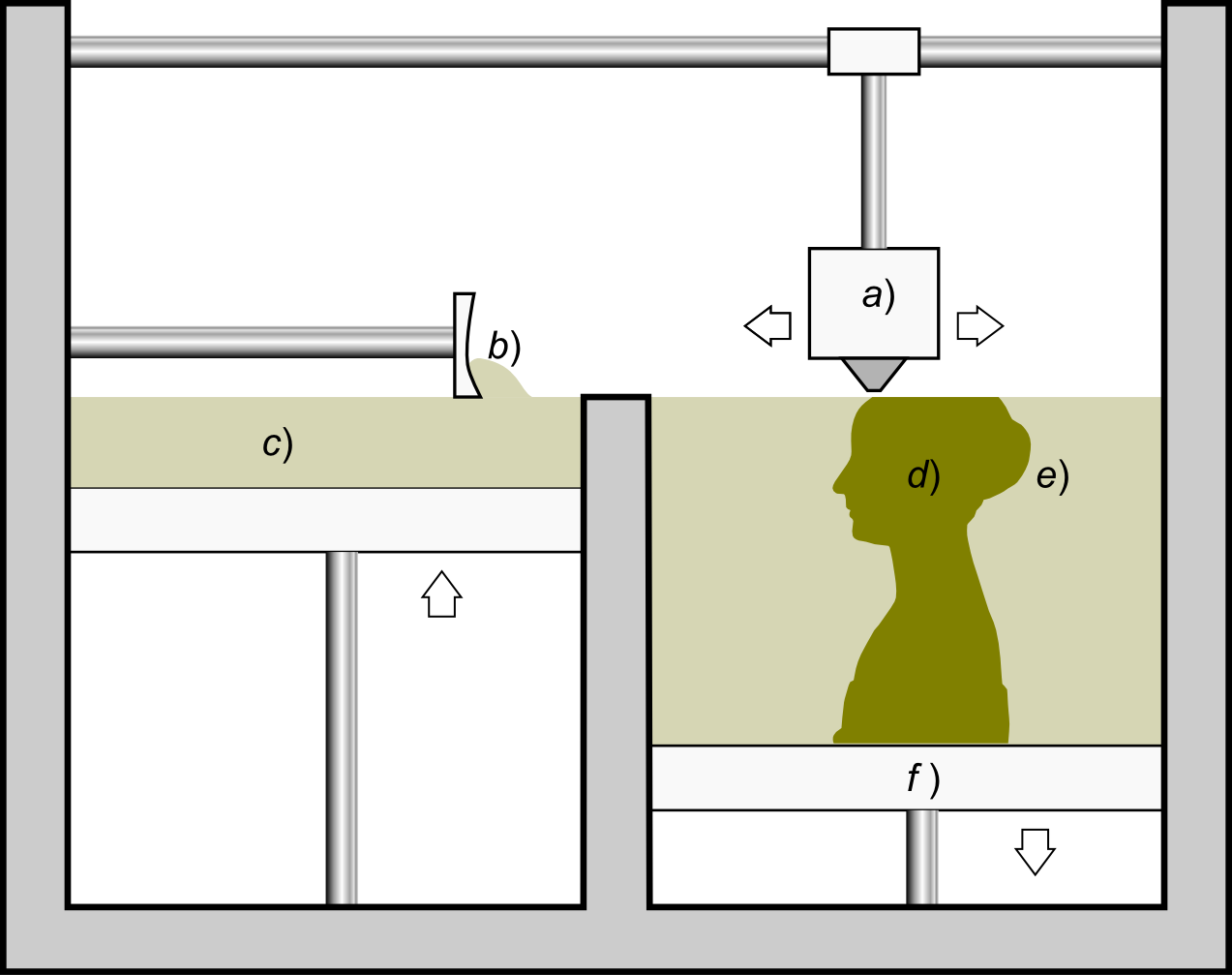
Schematic representation of the process: a moving head a) selectively binds (by dropping glue or by laser sintering) the surface of a powder bed e); a moving platform f) progressively lowers the bed and the solidified object d) rests inside the unbound powder. New powder is continuously added to the bed from a powder reservoir c) by means of a leveling mechanism b)

Binder jet 3D printing, known variously as "powder bed and inkjet" and "drop-on-powder" printing, is a rapid prototyping and additive manufacturing technology for making objects described by digital data such as a CAD file. Binder jetting is one of the seven categories of additive manufacturing processes according to ASTM and ISO.

== History ==
This technology was first developed at the Massachusetts Institute of Technology and patented in 1993. In 1996, the ExOne Company was granted an exclusive field-of-use patent for the technology, while Z Corporation, which was later acquired by 3D Systems, obtained a non-exclusive patent for use of the technology for metal casting purposes. The term "Three-Dimensional Printing" was trademarked by the research group at MIT, along with the abbreviation 3DP. As a result, the term "3D printing" originally referred uniquely to the binder jet printing process prior to gaining wider acceptance as a term referring to all additive manufacturing processes.

== Description ==
As in many other additive manufacturing processes the part to be printed is built up from many thin cross sections of the 3D model. An inkjet print head moves across a bed of powder, selectively depositing a liquid binding material. A thin layer of powder is spread across the completed section and the process is repeated with each layer adhering to the last.

When the model is complete, unbound powder is automatically and/or manually removed in a process called "de-powdering" and may be reused to some extent.

The de-powdered part could optionally be subjected to various infiltrants or other treatments to produce properties desired in the final part.

== Materials ==
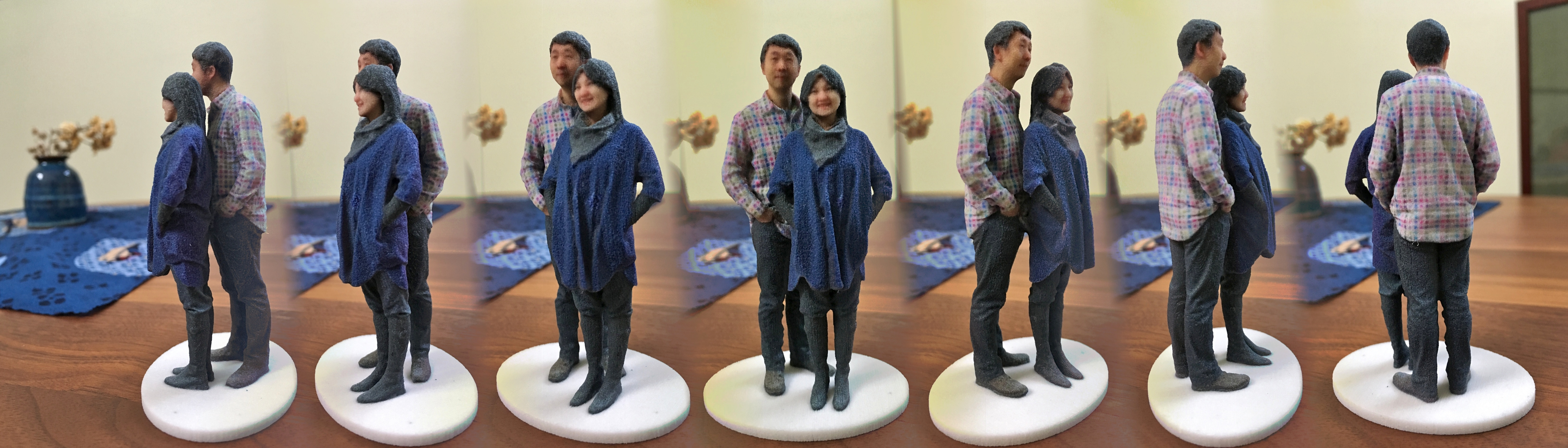
A 3D selfie in 1:20 scale printed by Shapeways using gypsum-based printing, created by Madurodam miniature park from 2D pictures taken at its Fantasitron photo booth.

In the original implementations, starch and gypsum plaster fill the powder bed, the liquid "binder" being mostly water to activate the plaster. The binder also includes dyes (for color printing), and additives to adjust viscosity, surface tension, and boiling point to match print head specifications. The resulting plaster parts typically lack "green strength" and require infiltration by melted wax, cyanoacrylate glue, epoxy, etc. before regular handling.

While not necessarily employing conventional inkjet technology, various other powder-binder combinations may be deployed to form objects by chemical or mechanical means. The resulting parts may then be subjected to different post-processing regimes, such as infiltration or bakeout. This may be done, for example, to eliminate the mechanical binder (e.g., by burning) and consolidate the core material (e.g., by melting), or to form a composite material blending the properties of powder and binder. Depending on the material, full color printing may or may not be an option. As of 2014, inventors and manufacturers have developed systems for forming objects from sand and calcium carbonate (forming a synthetic marble), acrylic powder and cyanoacrylate, ceramic powder and a liquid binder, sugar and water (for making candies), etc. One of the first commercially available products that incorporated the use of Graphene, was a powdered composite used in powder bed inkjet head 3D printing.

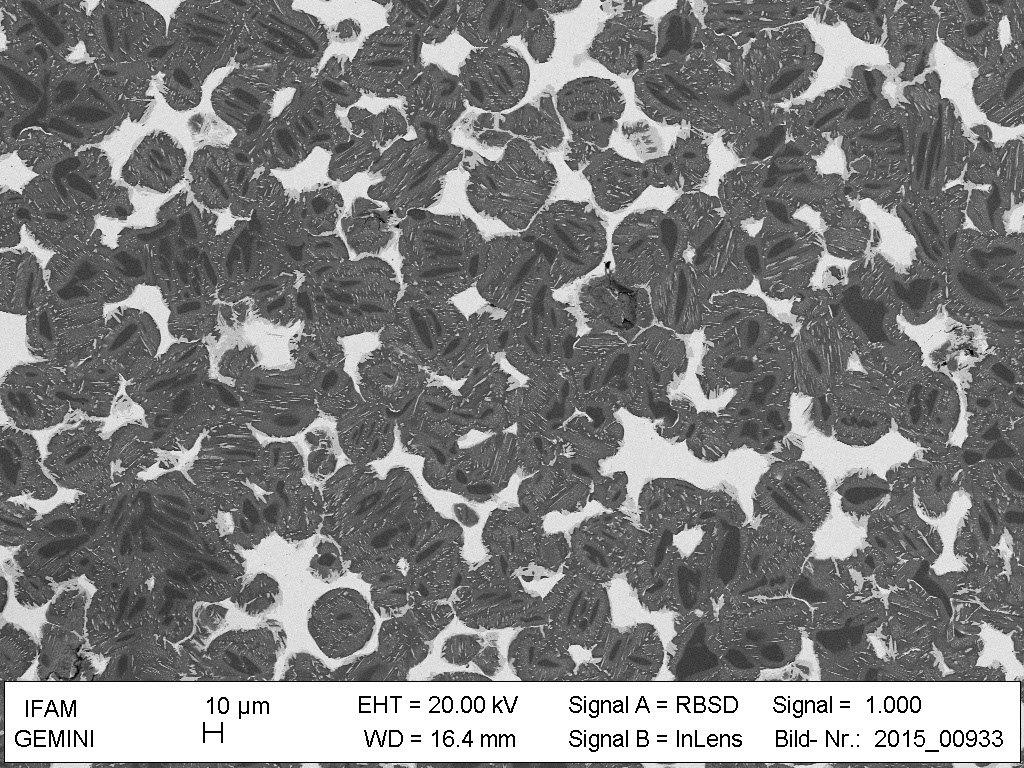
Composite of Ti-6Al-4V and silver, produced by means of 3D printing and infiltration, SEM picture of metallographic section

3D printing technology has a limited potential to vary material properties in a single build, but is generally limited by the use of a common core material. In the original Z Corporation systems, cross-sections are typically printed with solid outlines (forming a solid shell) and a lower-density interior pattern to speed printing and ensure dimensional stability as the part cures.

== Characteristics ==
In addition to volumetric color by use of multiple print heads and colored binder, the 3D printing process is generally faster than other additive manufacturing technologies such as fused deposition modeling material jetting which require 100% of build and support material to be deposited at the desired resolution. In 3D printing, the bulk of each printed layer, regardless of complexity, is deposited by the same, rapid spreading process.

As with other powder-bed technologies, support structures are generally not required because loose powder supports overhanging features and stacked or suspended objects. The elimination of printed support structures can reduce build time and material use and simplify both equipment and post-processing. However, de-powdering itself can be a delicate, messy, and time-consuming task. Some machines therefore automate de-powdering and powder recycling to what extent feasible. Since the entire build volume is filled with powder, as with stereolithography, means to evacuate a hollow part must be accommodated in the design.

Like other powder-bed processes, surface finish and accuracy, object density, and—depending on the material and process—part strength may be inferior to technologies such as stereolithography (SLA) or selective laser sintering (SLS). Although "stair-stepping" and asymmetrical dimensional properties are features of 3D printing as most other layered manufacturing processes, 3D printing materials are generally consolidated in such a way that minimizes the difference between vertical and in-plane resolution. The process also lends itself to rasterization of layers at target resolutions, a fast process that can accommodate intersecting solids and other data artifacts.

Powder bed and inkjet 3D printers typically range in price from $50,000 to $2,000,000. However, there is a hobbyist DIY kit selling from $800 to convert a consumer FDM printer to powder/inkjet printer.

== Limitations ==
Parts printed using the binder jetting process are inherently porous and have an unfinished surface, as unlike powder bed fusion the powders are not physically melted and are joined by a binding agent. While the usage of a binding agent allows for high melting temperature (e.g. ceramic) and heat-sensitive (e.g. polymer) materials to be powdered and used for additive manufacturing, binder jetting parts require additional post-processing that can require more time than it takes to print the part, such as curing, sintering, and additional finishing .

X-ray image of normal metal and agglomerate particles produced during the binder jetting process. The utilized powder was 9um Stainless Steel 316. Note the large, circular agglomerate particles- these lead to powder bed depletion.

Binder jetting is particularly prone to the phenomena of powder bed depletion, which occurs when the binder is dropped onto the surface of the powder bed. This issue is particularly prevalent in binder jetting, as unlike traditional additive manufacturing processes (which utilize high heat to melt and fuse powders together), the "jet" of binder that is dropped onto the bed can cause large agglomerates of semi-bonded powder to be ejected from the surface, leaving behind subsurface depletion zones (for 30 μm SS316 powder, a depletion zone depth of 56±12μm was observed). The growth of depletion zones as subsequent layers of powder are deposited printed can have major ramifications on the quality of parts printed with binder jetting. Ejected agglomerates land on other regions of the bed, causing the surface of the bed to become less even, the dimensions of the final part to be warped and inaccurate, and large subsurface pores to form. Residual defects and stress may also be present throughout, which reduce the strength of the already weaker part (due to the inherent porosity of the binder jetted part) .

These factors limit the usage of binder jetting for high-performance applications, such as for aerospace, as binder jetted parts are generally weaker than those printed with powder bed fusion processes. However, binder jetting is perfect for rapid prototyping and production of low-cost metal parts .

== See also ==
- 3D printing, additive process used to make a 3D object
- 3D printing marketplace, website for digital 3D printable files
- List of common 3D test models
- Multi-jet fusion, 3D printing by fusing powder in layers
- Volumetric printing, three-dimensional digital-to-physical imaging technology using material suspended in a volume to form volumetric scene in physical space. In particular, Volumetric 3D printing is a type of 3D printing building the entire object at once instead of layer by layer.
