= Selective laser sintering =

3D printing technique

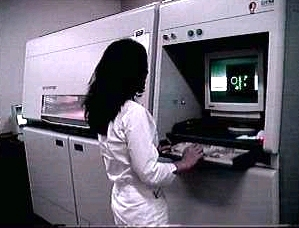
An SLS machine being used at the Centro de Pesquisas Renato Archer in Brazil.

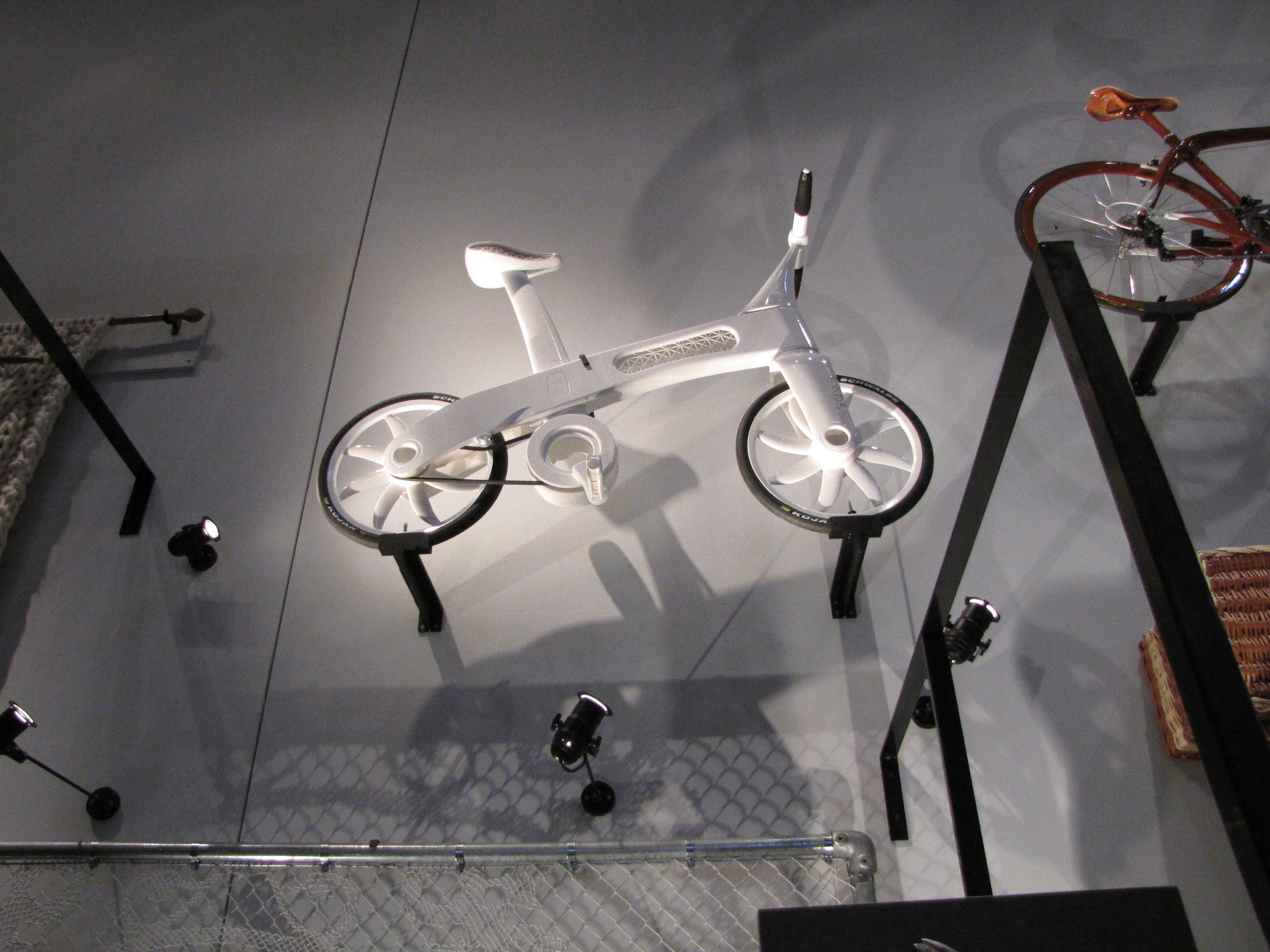
The world's first workable sintered nylon bicycle in The Power of Making exhibition at the Victoria and Albert Museum, London (2011)

Typical setup for rapid prototyping by laser sintering layer-by-layer.

Selective laser sintering (SLS) is an additive manufacturing (AM)(3D printing) technique that uses a laser as the power and heat source to sinter powdered material (typically nylon or polyamide), aiming the laser automatically at points in space defined by a 3D model, binding the material together to create a solid structure. It is similar to selective laser melting; the two are instantiations of the same concept but differ in technical details. SLS (as well as the other mentioned AM techniques) is a relatively new technology that so far has mainly been used for rapid prototyping and for low-volume production of component parts. Production roles are expanding as the commercialization of AM technology improves.

== History ==
Selective laser sintering (SLS) was developed and patented by Dr. Carl Deckard and academic adviser, Dr. Joe Beaman at the University of Texas at Austin in the mid-1980s, under sponsorship of DARPA. Deckard and Beaman were involved in the resulting start up company Desk Top Manufacturing (DTM) Corp, established to design and build the SLS machines. In 2001, 3D Systems, the biggest competitor to DTM Corp. and SLS technology, acquired DTM Corp.. The most recent patent regarding Deckard's SLS technology was issued January 28, 1997 and expired January 28, 2014.

A similar process was patented without being commercialized by R. F. Housholder in 1979.

As SLS requires the use of high-powered lasers it is often too expensive, not to mention possibly too dangerous, to use in the home. The associated expense and potential danger of SLS printing due to lack of commercially available laser systems with Class-1 safety enclosures means that the home market for SLS printing is not as large as the market for other additive manufacturing technologies, such as Fused Deposition Modeling (FDM).

== Technology ==
An additive manufacturing layer technology, SLS involves the use of a high power laser (for example, a carbon dioxide laser) to fuse small particles of plastic, metal, ceramic, or glass powders into a mass that has a desired three-dimensional shape. The laser selectively fuses powdered material by scanning cross-sections generated from a 3-D digital description of the part (for example from a CAD file or scan data) on the surface of a powder bed. After each cross-section is scanned, the powder bed is lowered by one layer thickness, a new layer of material is applied on top, and the process is repeated until the part is completed.

Selective laser sintering process 1 Laser 2 Scanner system 3 Powder delivery system 4 Powder delivery piston 5 Roller 6 Fabrication piston 7 Fabrication powder bed 8 Object being fabricated (see inset) A Laser scanning direction B Sintered powder particles (brown state) C Laser beam D Laser sintering E Pre-placed powder bed (green state) F Unsintered material in previous layers

Because finished part density depends on peak laser power, rather than laser duration, a SLS machine typically uses a pulsed laser. The SLS machine preheats the bulk powder material in the powder bed somewhat below its melting point, to make it easier for the laser to raise the temperature of the selected regions the rest of the way to the melting point.

In contrast with SLA and FDM, which most often require special support structures to fabricate overhanging designs, SLS does not need extra material or special considerations for support structures because the part being constructed is surrounded by unsintered powder at all times. This allows for the construction of previously impossible geometries. Since the machine's chamber is always filled with powder material, "Nesting" can be used to save time and cost by printing multiple parts at once. While SLA and FDM prints can contain parts that are hollow yet fully enclosed, SLS requires hollow enclosures to have an opening for the unsintered powder within to be drained.

Affordable home SLS printers have become possible as relevant patents have started to expire, but the heating process still has stringent requirements, with a power consumption of up to 5 kW and temperatures having to be controlled within 2 °C for the three stages of preheating, melting and storing before removal.

== Materials ==
The quality of printed structures depends on the various factors include powder properties such as particle size and shape, density, roughness, and porosity. Furthermore, the particle distribution and their thermal properties have a significant effect on the flowability of the powder.

Commercially-available materials used in SLS come in powder form and include, but are not limited to, polymers such as polyamides (PA), polystyrenes (PS), thermoplastic elastomers (TPE), and polyaryletherketones (PAEK). Polyamides are the most commonly used SLS materials due to their ideal sintering behavior as a semi-crystalline thermoplastic, resulting in parts with desirable mechanical properties. Polycarbonate (PC) is a material of high interest for SLS due to its high toughness, thermal stability, and flame resistance; however, such amorphous polymers processed by SLS tend to result in parts with diminished mechanical properties and/or dimensional accuracy and thus are limited to applications where these are of low importance. Metal materials are not commonly used in SLS since the development of selective laser melting.

=== Powder production ===
Powder particles are typically produced by cryogenic grinding in a ball mill at temperatures well below the glass transition temperature of the material, which can be reached by running the grinding process with added cryogenic materials such as dry ice (dry grinding), or mixtures of liquid nitrogen and organic solvents (wet grinding). The process can result in spherical or irregular shaped particles as low as five microns in diameter. Powder particle size distributions are typically gaussian and range from 15 to 100 microns in diameter, although this can be customized to suit different layer thicknesses in the SLS process. Chemical binder coatings can be applied to the powder surfaces post-process; these coatings aid in the sintering process and are especially helpful to form composite material parts such as with alumina particles coated with thermoset epoxy resin.

=== Sintering mechanisms ===
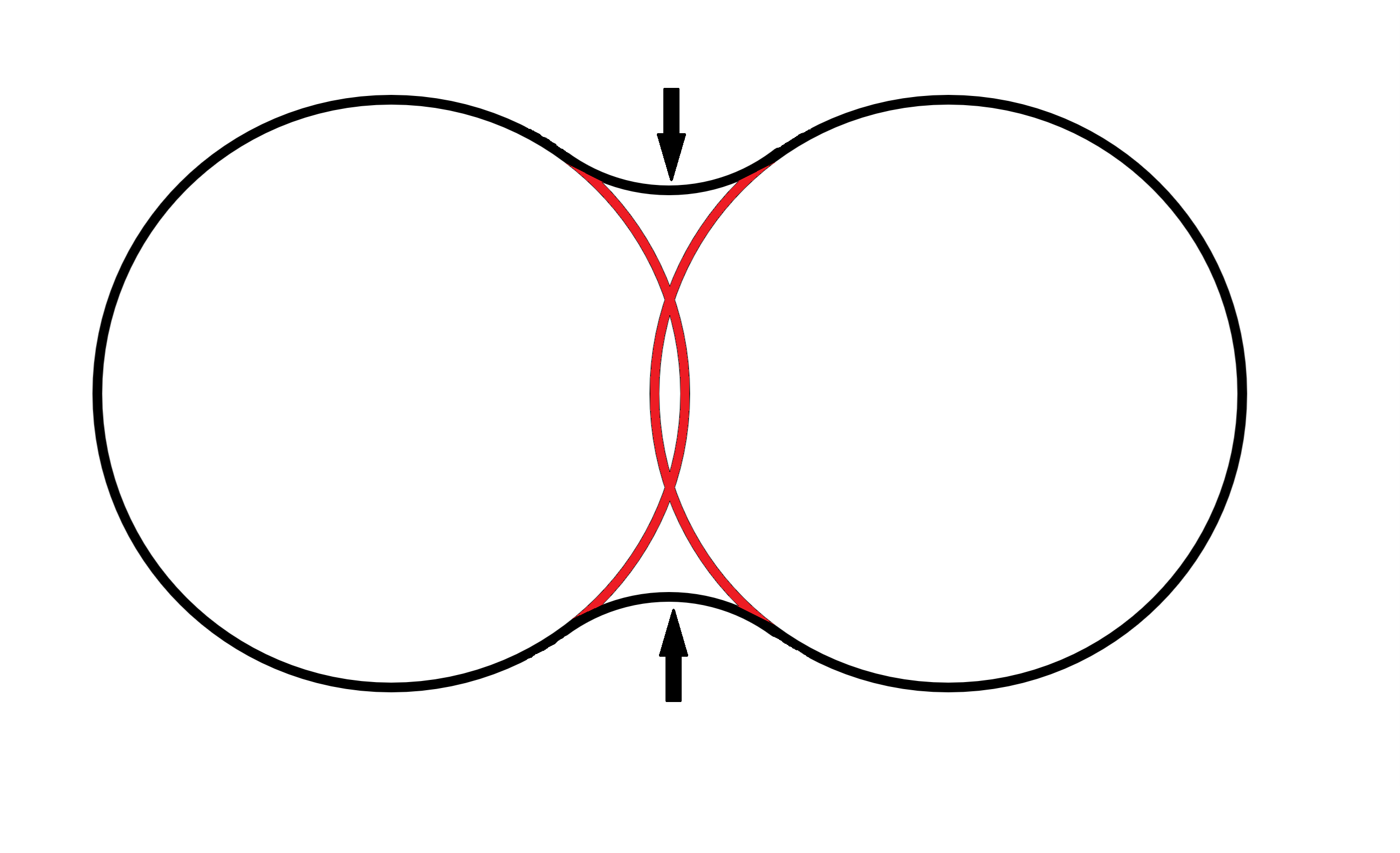
Diagram showing formation of neck in two sintered powder particles. Original shapes are shown in red.

Sintering in SLS primarily occurs in the liquid state when the powder particles forms a micro-melt layer at the surface, resulting in a reduction in viscosity and the formation of a concave radial bridge between particles, known as necking, due to the material's response to lower its surface energy. In the case of coated powders, the purpose of the laser is to melt the surface coating which will act as a binder. Solid state sintering is also a contributing factor, albeit with a much reduced influence, and occurs at temperatures below the melting temperature of the material. The principal driving force behind the process is again the material's response to lower its free energy state resulting in diffusion of molecules across particles.

== Applications ==
SLS technology is in wide use at many industries around the world due to its ability to easily make complex geometries with little to no added manufacturing effort. Its most common application is in prototype parts early in the design cycle such as for investment casting patterns, automotive hardware, and wind tunnel models. SLS is also increasingly being used in limited-run manufacturing to produce end-use parts for aerospace, military, medical, pharmaceutical, and electronics hardware. On a shop floor, SLS can be used for rapid manufacturing of tooling, jigs, and fixtures.

== Advantages ==
- The sintered powder bed is fully self-supporting, allowing for:
  - High overhanging angles (0 to 45 degrees from the horizontal plane)
  - Complex geometries embedded deep into parts, such as conformal cooling channels
  - Batch production of multiple parts produced in 3D arrays, a process called nesting
- Parts possess high strength and stiffness
- Good chemical resistance
- Various finishing possibilities (e.g., metallization, stove enameling, vibratory grinding, tub coloring, bonding, powder, coating,
- Bio compatible according to EN ISO 10993-1 and USP/level VI/121 °C
- Complex parts with interior components can be built without trapping the material inside and altering the surface from support removal.
- Fastest additive manufacturing process for printing functional, durable, prototypes or end user parts
- Wide variety of materials with characteristics of strength, durability, and functionality
- Due to the reliable mechanical properties, parts can often substitute typical injection molding plastics

== Disadvantages ==
- Parts have porous surfaces; these can be sealed by several different post-processing methods such as cyanoacrylate coatings, or by hot isostatic pressing.

== See also ==
- 3D printing
- Desktop manufacturing
- Digital fabricator
- Direct digital manufacturing
- Electron-beam melting
- Fab lab
- Fused filament fabrication
- Instant manufacturing, also known as direct manufacturing or on-demand manufacturing
- Rapid manufacturing
- Rapid prototyping
- RepRap Project
- Selective heat sintering
- Solid freeform fabrication
- Stereolithography
- Von Neumann universal constructor
