= Novameat =

Food tech startup that works with plant-based foods

NOVAMEAT
- Type: Privately held company
- Industry: Food technology
- Founded: 2018
- Founder: Giuseppe Scionti
- Headquarters: Barcelona, Spain
- Number of employees: (1–10 (2019))
- Website: novameat.com

Novameat is a food tech startup that works with plant-based foods, including plant-based meat substitutes. According to El País, the company was responsible in 2018 for creating a meat substitute through 3D printing, whereby a plant-based paste was used with syringes placed in a 3D printer using AutoCAD software.

== History ==
Novameat was founded in 2018 by Giuseppe Scionti, a bioengineering researcher and entrepreneur. In September 2019, the company announced it had received funding from New Crop Capital, a private venture fund that has also invested in Beyond Meat, Memphis Meats, SuperMeat, Mosa Meat, Good Catch, Kite Hill and Zero Egg, among other companies developing plant-based and cell-based products. Also in 2019, Novameat was included in Peter Diamandis' article "The 5 Big Breakthroughs to Anticipate in 3D Printing".

== Approach ==
Novameat intents to provide the machinery to make the plant-based meat under a licensing agreement to other companies. Novameat uses 3D printing to produce meat substitutes made from plants.The company utilizes pea protein, beetroot juice, and other plant-based elements to create its 3D- printed steak. With industrial machinery, Novameat can produce 500 kg of plant-based whole cuts per hour. With only plant-based elements, Novameat aims to recreate the muscle fibers of animal meat.
