= Scionti =

Scionti is an Italian surname. Notable people with the surname include:

- Michael Scionti (born 1968), American judge and politician
- Silvio Scionti (1882–1973), Italian-born American pianist and teacher
- Giuseppe Scionti (born 1986), Italian entrepreneur
- Enzo Scionti (born 2005), American racing driver
