= Benjamin S. Cook =

American scientist

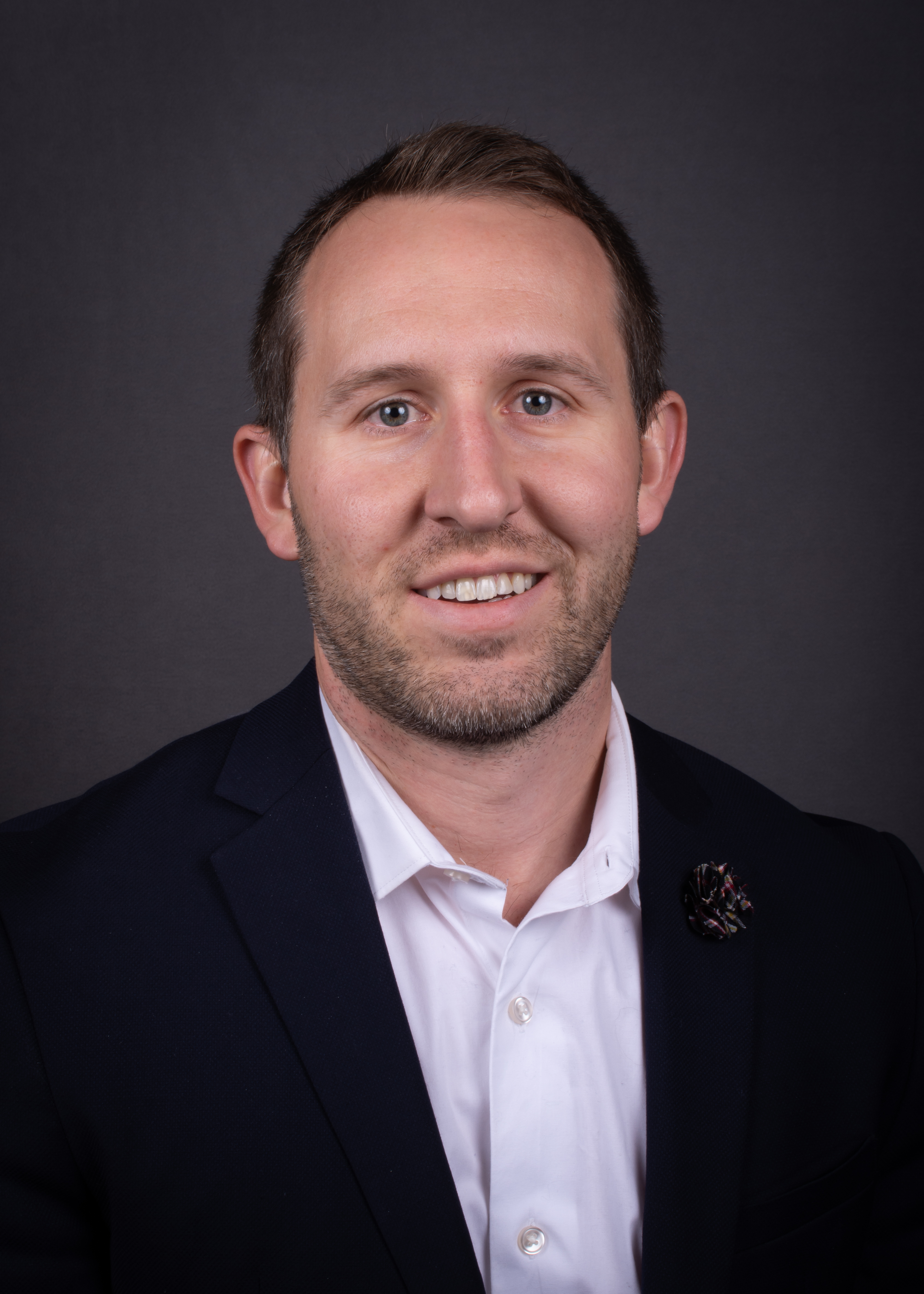
- Born: Chicago, Illinois, United States
- Education: Georgia Institute of Technology
- Scientific career
- Fields: Nanotechnology, RF MEMS, Photonics, Printed electronics, Semiconductors, Antennas, Electromagnetics
- Workplaces: Meta (Facebook) Reality Labs; Texas Instruments; Georgia Institute of Technology; King Abdullah University of Science and Technology; Rose Hulman Institute of Technology

Benjamin S. Cook is an American scientist, entrepreneur, advisory board member, professor, and author. He is best known for his work on AI and AR consumer electronics, and earlier in his career, for pioneering the first semiconductor-compatible printed electronics process, VIPRE. He holds over 250 patents and patents pending, and over 100 peer-reviewed journal and conference publications.

== Biography ==
Benjamin S. Cook received the Bachelor of Science degree from Rose-Hulman Institute of Technology, the Master of Science degree from King Abdullah University of Science and Technology, and the Doctor of Philosophy degree in electrical engineering and materials science from Georgia Institute of Technology.

From 2006 to 2014, he was the founder and president of Soft-Tronics, a technology consulting firm which partnered with technology startups to accelerate growth and market penetration. In 2014, he joined Texas Instruments Kilby Labs to industrialize his pioneering work in semiconductor printed electronics and additive manufacturing. Currently, he is the Sr. Director of Texas Instruments' Nanotechnology Organization and holds advisory positions on the Rose-Hulman Academic Advisory Board, the Elsevier Journal of Additive Manufacturing, as well as several other research consortiums.

== Awards ==
- Member of the Group Technical Staff, Texas Instruments (2016)
- Rose-Hulman Career Achievement Award, Alumni of the Year (2016)
- Intel Doctoral Fellowship Award (2013)
- IEEE Antennas & Propagation Society Doctoral Fellowship Award (2012)
- Rose-Hulman Engineer of the Year (2010)

== Books ==
- Handbook of Flexible Electronics: Materials, Manufacturing and Applications, Woodhead Publishing
- Handbook of Antenna Technologies: Advanced Antenna Fabrication Processes (MEMS/LTCC/LCP/Printing), Springer Publishing
- Green RFID Systems: Materials and Substrates, Cambridge Press
