= Fraunhofer Competence Field Additive Manufacturing =

German network of 3D printing companies

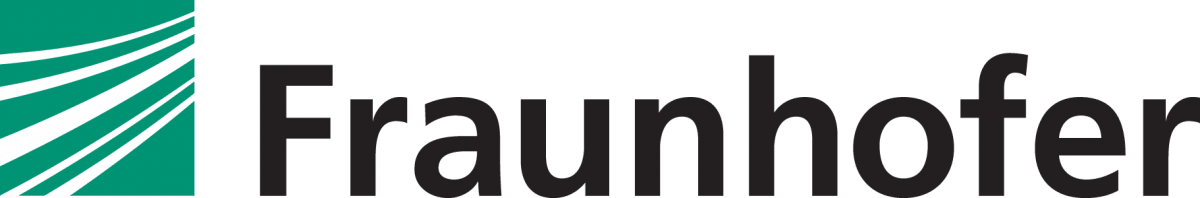
- Founded: 1998
- Headquarters: Dresden, Germany
- Key people: Dr.-Ing. Bernhard Müller (spokesman)
- Website: www.additiv.fraunhofer.de/en

Fraunhofer Competence Field Additive Manufacturing is a network of eighteen Fraunhofer institutes across Germany, which depending on their main focus, deal with subjects concerning additive manufacturing and represent the entire process chain. This includes the development, application and implementation of additive production processes as well as associated materials. Topics may cover all aspects of additive manufacturing, such as: materials and technologies, assessing and improving the quality of 3D printed parts, optimizing parts for various criteria (weight, stiffness, etc.) and digital workflow (slicers, adaptive machine control).

The network was founded as Fraunhofer Rapid Prototyping Alliance in 1998 and was relaunched as Fraunhofer Additive Manufacturing Alliance in 2008, when additive manufacturing took off as a manufacturing technology of the future. In 2021 Fraunhofer reorganizes its research areas in order to better meet the industrial requirements and the Fraunhofer Additive Manufacturing Alliance will bundle its expertise in the Fraunhofer Competence Field Additive Manufacturing.

Based on many years of experience in fulfilling nationally and internationally industrial contracts as well as research projects, the Fraunhofer Competence Field Additive Manufacturing develops customized designs for each customer and manages complex assignments. Its current focus is on bio-medical engineering, micro-system engineering, automotive engineering & aerospace, tool making as well as handling and assembly.

The two main fairs every year are the Rapid.Tech 3D in June and the formnext in November. The Rapid.Tech 3D is focussed on manufacturing of end products using additive techniques and how the technology can be transferred into mass production. The formnext is a global trade fair dedicated to additive manufacturing and industrial 3D printing, where experts come from a wide range of industry sectors, such as automotive, aerospace, mechanical engineering, medical technology, electrical engineering and many more.

== Direct Digital Manufacturing Conference (DDMC) ==
The Fraunhofer Competence Field Additive Manufacturing organizes the biannual DDMC, which is a cutting-edge forum for discussion on Additive Manufacturing, including its application in industry and the environmental impact of such new manufacturing technologies. Impact on health, sustainability and technology will also be discussed. DDMC brings together researchers, educators and practitioners from around the world and fosters an atmosphere conducive to developing new ideas and refining already existing research developments.

== Fraunhofer-Institutes ==
The Fraunhofer Competence Field Additive Manufacturing includes the following Fraunhofer-Institutes:

- Fraunhofer-Institut für Fertigungstechnik und Angewandte Materialforschung (IFAM)
- Fraunhofer-Institut für Keramische Technologien und Systeme (IKTS)
- Fraunhofer-Institut für Lasertechnik (ILT)
- Fraunhofer-Institut für Produktionstechnik und Automatisierung (IPA)
- Fraunhofer-Institut für Produktionstechnologie (IPT)
- Fraunhofer-Institut für Werkstoffmechanik (IWM)
- Fraunhofer-Institut für Umwelt-, Sicherheits- und Energietechnik (UMSICHT)
- Fraunhofer-Institut für Werkzeugmaschinen und Umformtechnik (IWU)
- Fraunhofer-Institut für Graphische Datenverarbeitung (IGD)
- Fraunhofer-Institut für Grenzflächen- und Bioverfahrenstechnik (IGB)
- Fraunhofer-Institut für Kurzzeitdynamik (EMI)
- Fraunhofer-Institut für Schicht- und Oberflächentechnik (IST)
- Fraunhofer-Institut für Arbeitswirtschaft und Organisation (IAO)
- Fraunhofer-Institut für Werkstoff- und Strahltechnik (IWS)
- Fraunhofer-Institut für Produktionsanlagen und Konstruktionstechnik (IPK)
- Fraunhofer-Institut für Silicatforschung (ISC)
- Fraunhofer-Einrichtung für Wertstoffkreisläufe und Ressourcenstrategie (IWKS)
- Fraunhofer-Einrichtung für Gießerei-, Composite- und Verarbeitungstechnik (IGCV)
- Fraunhofer-Einrichtung für Additive Produktionstechnologien (IAPT)
