= 3D printing in India =

The first 3D printing (additive manufacturing) was used in 1983 by an American inventor, Charles (Chuck) W. Hull, to make industrial components. It is unknown when 3D printing technology entered India, but the earliest reference to 3D printing in India is when Imaginarium company started making jewellery via 3D printing technology. 3D printing has been rapidly used in many industries in India, like the medical, automotive, jewellery, and construction areas. Industries are using this technology to save time, material, and money.

== 3D policy ==
=== Weapons ===
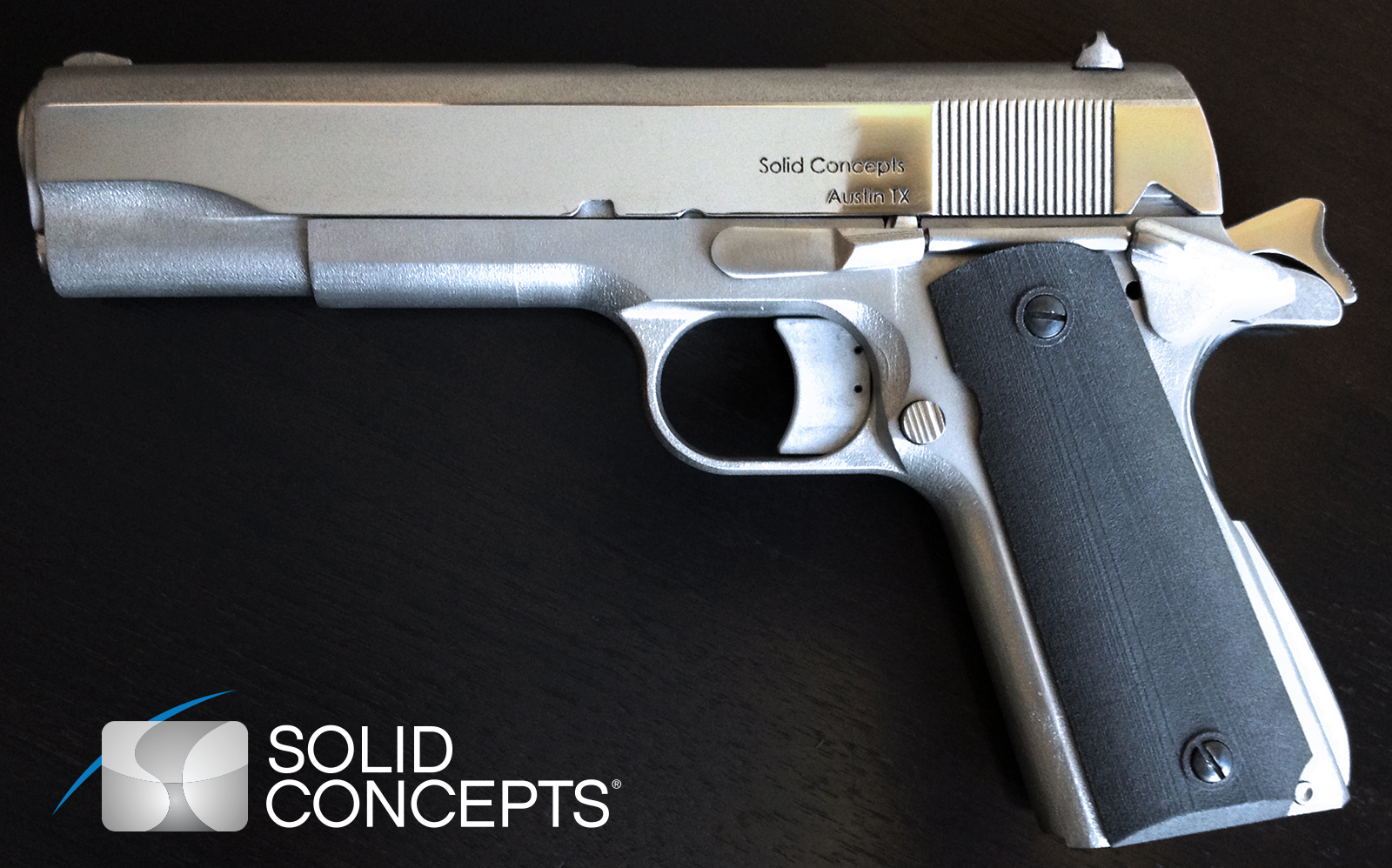
3D printed gun

India has no rules or regulations imposed on owning or operating 3D printing technology. People around the world have tried to use 3D printing machines to produce dangerous weapons. The Indian government has not made laws to stop crimes that could happen using 3D printing technology.

=== Copyright ===
The CAD file is a design and blueprint of a 2D and 3D item; the 3D machine uses the CAD file to produce 3D products. Indian Copyright Act of 1957 protects these CAD files as artistic work. However, any CAD file generated by scanning a product is not copyrighted.

== Industrial changes ==
The 3D printer revolutionized the Indian manufacturing industry. Industries like construction, jewelry, medical, automobiles, and aerospace have been utilizing 3D printing to save time, money, and resources. The Indian government plans to increase 100 new startups in 3D printing by 2025. India aims to create 50 new technologies to advance 3D printing in the industry. India has predicted that this new technology will generate 100,000 new jobs in India. The Indian government targeted to produce 500 new products using 3D printing technology by 2025.

3D printing of a house

Businesses in India are modernizing. India has transformed itself from buying foreign 3D printers to making high-technology 3D printing domestically. Now, industries in India are selling 3D printers to foreign nations and collaborating with some companies to share their technology. India has over 1,000 domestic 3D printing companies valued at $100 million. Housing companies in India are developing technology to construct houses with 3D printers, which will help lower costs and be more sustainable. India's medical industry uses 3D printing technology to make products like organs and tissue to help doctors with studies and training. The medical industry is estimated to take up 20% of the 3D printing industry worldwide.
