= Agile tooling =

Tool production using advanced manufacturing technologies

Agile tooling is the design and fabrication of manufacturing related-tools such as dies, molds, patterns, jigs and fixtures in a configuration that aims to maximise the tools' performance, minimise manufacturing time and cost, and avoid delay in prototyping. A fully functional agile tooling laboratory consists of CNC milling, turning and routing equipment. It can also include additive manufacturing platforms (such as fused filament fabrication, selective laser sintering, Stereolithography, and direct metal laser sintering), hydroforming, vacuum forming, die casting, stamping, injection molding and welding equipment.

Agile tooling is similar to rapid tooling, which uses additive manufacturing to make tools or tooling quickly, either directly by making parts that serve as the actual tools or tooling components, such as mold inserts; or indirectly by producing patterns that are in turn used in a secondary process to produce the actual tools. Another similar technique is prototype tooling, where molds, dies and other devices are used to produce prototypes. Rapid manufacturing, and specifically rapid tooling technologies, are earlier in their development than rapid prototyping (RP) technologies, and are often extensions of RP.

The aim of all toolmaking is to catch design errors early in the design process; improve product design better products, reduce product cost, and reduce time to market.

== Users ==
Hundreds of universities and research centers around the globe are investing in additive manufacturing equipment in order to be positioned to make prototypes and tactile representations of real parts. Few have fully committed the concept of using additive manufacturing (AM) to create manufacturing tools (fixturing, clamps, molds, dies, patterns, negatives, etc.). AM experts seem to agree that tooling is a large, namely untapped market. Deloitte University Press estimated that in 2012 alone, the AM Tooling market $1.2 Billion. At that point in the development cycle of AM Tooling, much of the work was performed under the guise of “let’s try it and see what happens”.

== Industry applications ==
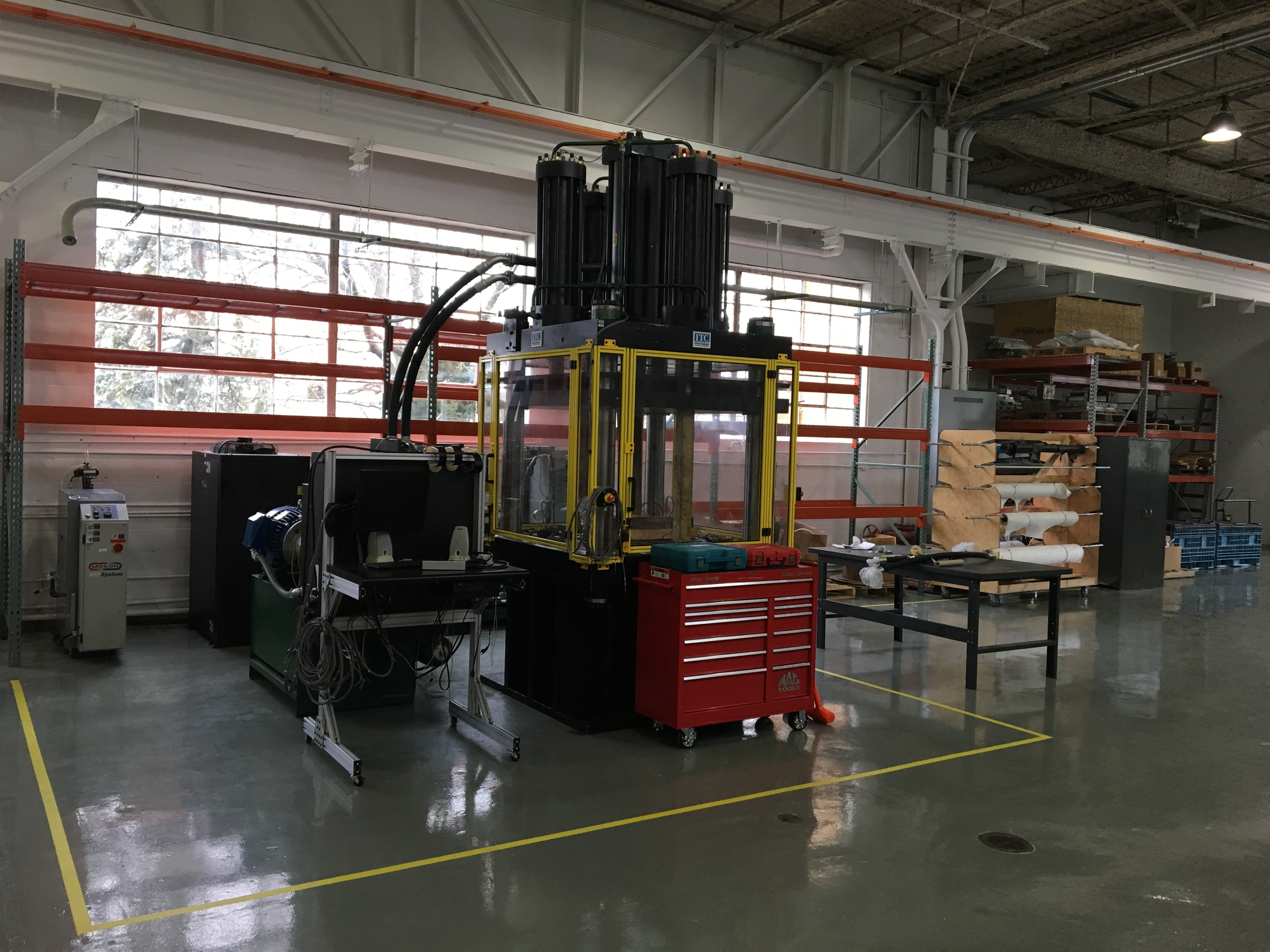
Interlaken hydroform and conventional press

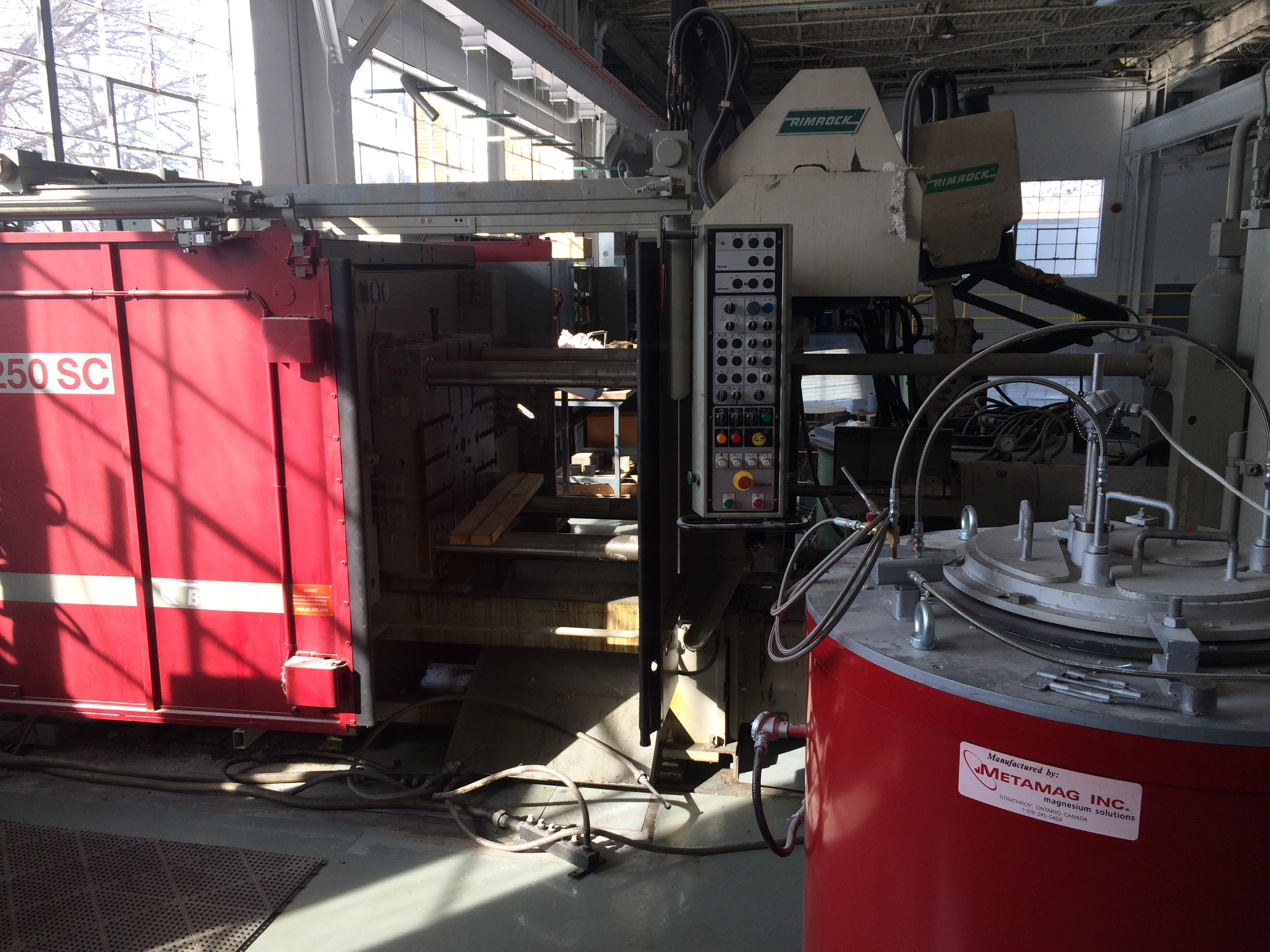
Buhler die-casting and squeeze casting press

Additive manufacturing, starting with today's infancy period, requires manufacturing firms to be flexible, ever-improving users of all available technologies to remain competitive. Advocates of additive manufacturing also predict that this arc of technological development will counter globalization, as end users will do much of their own manufacturing rather than engage in trade to buy products from other people and corporations. The real integration of the newer additive technologies into commercial production, however, is more a matter of complementing traditional subtractive methods rather than displacing them entirely.

Automotive – approaching niche vehicle markets (making less than 100, 000 vehicles), rather than high production volume

Aircraft – the U.S. aircraft industry operates in an environment where production volumes are relatively low and resulting product costs are relatively high. Agile tooling can be applied in the early design stage of the development cycle to minimize the high cost of redesign.

Medical – cast tooling would benefit a great deal from agile tooling. However, the cost for the tooling may still be significantly greater than the cost of a casting piece, with high lead times. Since only several dozen or several hundred metal parts are needed, the challenge for mass production is still prevalent. A balance between these four areas – quantity, design, material, and speed are key to designing and producing a fully functional product.

== See also ==
- Computer-aided design CAD)
- Computer-aided engineering (CAE)
- Computer-aided manufacturing (CAM)
