= CILAS =

French technology company

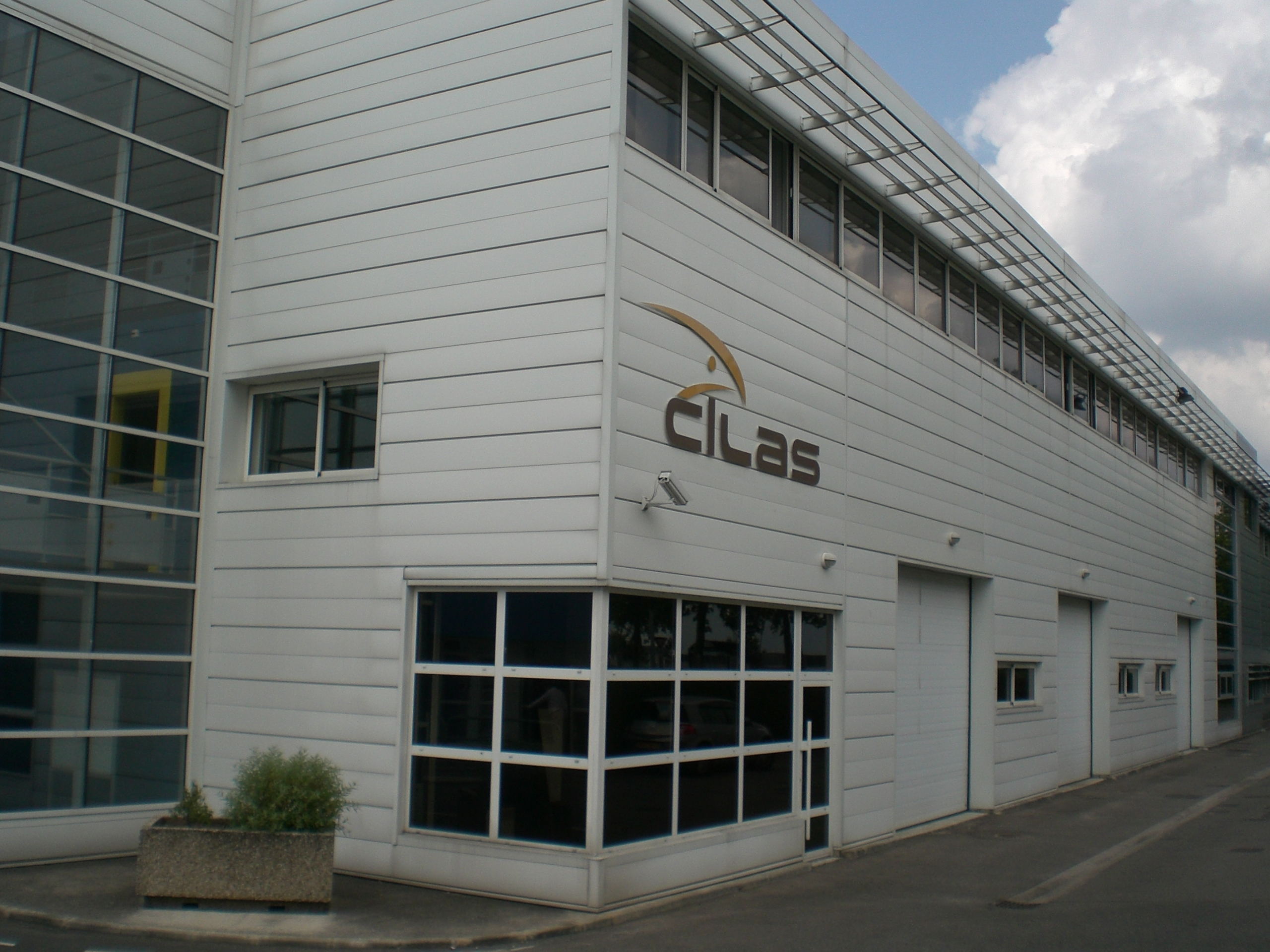
- Company type: Subsidiary
- Industry: manufacturing of optical and photographic equipment
- Founded: 1966; 60 years ago
- Headquarters: Orléans, France
- Key people: Philippe Lugherini
- Revenue: 26,7 million € (2009)
- Number of employees: 230 (2016)
- Website: www.cilas.com/index-us.htm

CILAS is a French company, a subsidiary of MBDA and Safran Electronics & Defense, specialized in laser and optics technology, founded in 1966. This high-technology engineering company was the inventor of the particle size analyzer. Today, it develops, manufactures and produces systems combining laser and precision optics in the field of high technology, accounting. Products for the military represent 50% of turnover against 50% civilian.

== History ==
This company was founded in 1966 by two companies : CGE (Compagnie Generale d'Électricité becoming Alcatel-Alsthom) and Saint-Gobain. The aim was to exploit industrially and commercially the work of laboratories working on laser sources and laser equipment.

In 1983, it became CILAS-Alcatel. In 1985, it was absorbed by two companies of optics : SORO Electro-Optics and BBT (Barbier Bernard and Turenne). Alcatel withdraws its laser activities in 1989, resulting in a change of ownership. In early 1990, the capital is divided between three companies, CEA Industries (now Areva), SAT and Unilaser Holding (Aerospace Group). CILAS-Alcatel becomes CILAS.

Meanwhile, from late 1989, the Unilaser group also acquired the Optronics Division of Alcatel Marcoussis laboratories and named it Laserdot. Unilaser now gather Quantel, LISA, CILAS and Laserdot.

From this moment, Laserdot and CILAS collaborate on joint projects. Laserdot is more oriented toward research and development whereas CILAS toward industrialization and production.

In 1994, SAT withdraws CILAS' capital and shares of the two remaining shareholders passed to 57% for Unilaser and 43% for CEA Industry. On September 1, 1995, CILAS and Laserdot are merged into a single entity which retains the name CILAS.

== Defence and security ==
Cilas develops and manufactures different products in the field of defence and security. It offers laser designators, counter-snipers optical sight systems detectors, rangefinders, airborne laser sources and shipborne helicopters landing aids.

== Products ==
With approximately 45% of its revenue generated in France and 55% from international markets, the company's primary commercial base remains domestic.

- Military products: high-power laser systems for counter-drone applications (including HELMA-P); laser rangefinders for tanks, helicopters, naval fire-control systems, and laser designators (DHY 208, DHY 308, and ALADEM-80) used for guided munitions or for detecting snipers. The company also develops directed-energy laser weapons.
- Civilian products: optical thin-film coatings; laser granulometers for measuring particle size in gases (an activity sold in 2017), liquids, and solids; and systems used in adaptive optics.
- Laser Mégajoule products: components and technologies supplied for the Laser Mégajoule (LMJ) facility of the French Alternative Energies and Atomic Energy Commission (CEA).
