= Giuseppe Scionti =

Italian technology entrepreneur and researcher

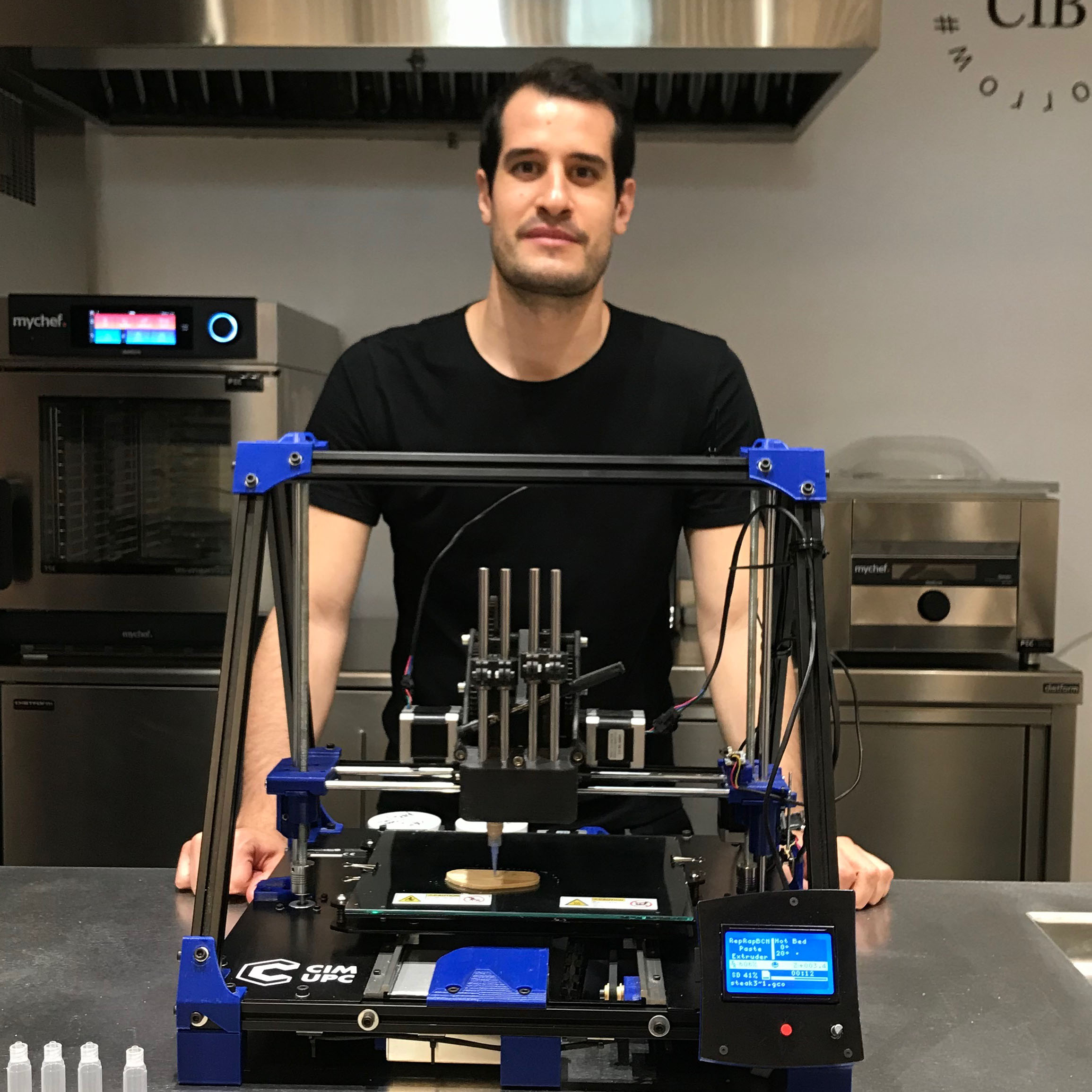
- Giuseppe Scionti, with a prototype of his printer in 2019
- Born: 1986 (age 39–40); Milan, Italy

Giuseppe Scionti (born 1986) is a technology entrepreneur, inventor, and researcher in the fields of bioengineering and food tech. He is the founder and CEO of Novameat. In 2018 and 2019, he was featured by international mass media as the inventor of the world's first 3D printed plant-based meat substitute.

== Background and personal life ==
Scionti was born in Milan, Italy in 1986. He received his PhD cum laude in Biomedicine from the University of Granada (2014) under the supervision of Dr. Antonio Campos Muñoz and Dr. Miguel Alaminos, MSc in Bioengineering (2010) from Chalmers University of Technology, and BSc in Bioengineering (2008) from Polytechnic University of Milan.

== Contributions to bioengineering ==
Scionti's research activities in the fields of Tissue Engineering and Biomaterials focused on the design and development of different bioengineering technologies for multiple biomedical applications, and on the generation of novel biomimetic materials with defined microstructure and physical properties, using a variety of natural and synthetic biomaterials. He participated in multiple biomedical research projects, with the objective of generating different soft and hard bioengineered tissues such as bone, cartilage, cornea, full-thickness skin, oral mucosa, peripheral nerve, tympanic membrane and blood vessels implants.

In 2013, he was awarded the Award and the status of Correspondent Member by the Royal Academy of Medicine and Surgery of Oriental Andalusia, for a research study on the in vivo evaluation of a novel nano-technological human artificial skin model.

In 2014, he co-authored a PCT International Patent on the development of magnetic field-sensitive biomaterials, based on the incorporation of biocompatible nanoparticles, generating the first smart magneto-rheological scaffolds for tissue engineering applications, whose mechanical properties can be controlled by non-contact magnetic forces.

In 2015, he was selected in the international jury for the MIT Innovators Under 35 Awards Mexico.

Between 2015 and 2018, he worked as Assistant Professor and Postdoctoral researcher at the Polytechnic University of Catalonia, focusing his research work on 3D printing and bioprinting technologies for biomedical applications.

== Contributions to food technology ==
In 2018, Scionti authored and submitted an international patent in the field of food technology, describing a unique technology that he developed and that allowed the production of fibrous plant-based food using a 3D-printer, mimicking meat texture and its nutritional value.

His current focus is on innovating the food system through the development of new plant-based meat products at Novameat.

He has been invited as keynote speaker at world-renowned Tech Talks formats and conferences, including a TEDx talk in 2018, and gave a speech supporting plant-based meat substitutes at the European Parliament in 2018.

In 2019, Scionti was selected in the list of "Nine Innovators to Watch in 2019" by Smithsonian (magazine), and his project at Novameat was included in Peter Diamandis' article "The 5 Big Breakthroughs to Anticipate in 3D Printing".
