= Carl Huneke =

German-American stained glass artist

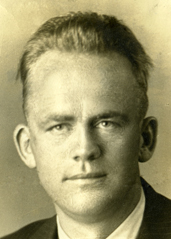
- 1932
- Born: 19 June 1898; Achim bei Bremen, Germany
- Died: 18 June 1972 (aged 73); San Francisco
- Resting place: Cypress Lawn Memorial Park, Colma, California, USA
- Known for: Stained-glass windows
- Spouse: Leopoldine (Lee) Moser Tham 1906 – 1978
- Children: Rudy Tham (Stepson) Marge Huneke Blaine
- Website: www.hunekestainedglass.com

Carl Huneke (19 June 1898 – 18 June 1972) was a German-American stained glass artist and master craftsman.

Proprietor of the Century Stained Glass Studio in San Francisco, California, Carl designed and created more than 1,000 stained glass windows in 70 churches and other buildings, mostly in Northern California.

== Biography ==
=== Early life ===
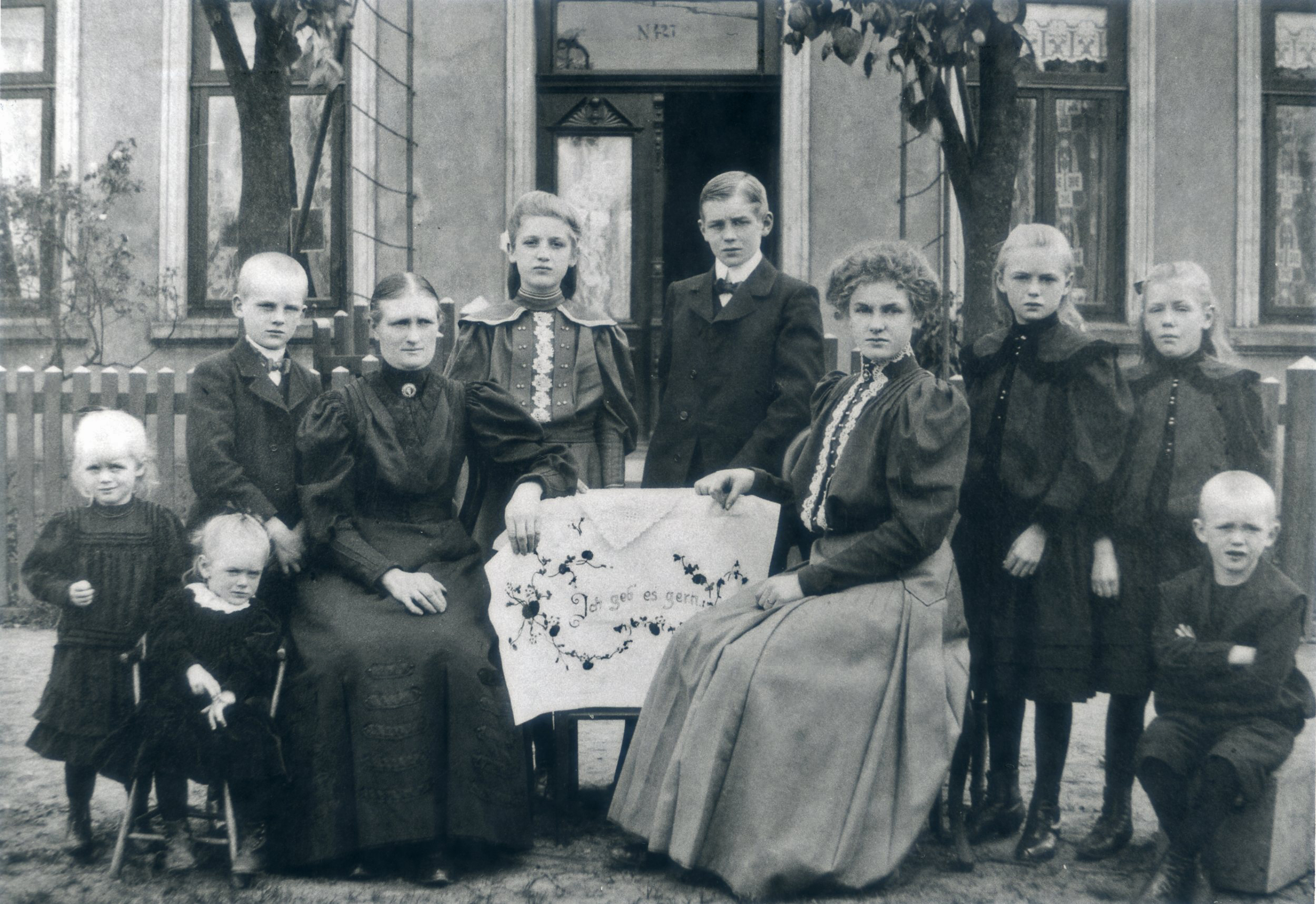
Achim 1907 – Carl (third from the left) with his mother and siblings after his father's funeral

Carl Johan Jacob Hüneke was born on 19 June 1898 in Achim bei Bremen, Germany to Johann and Johanna Helmcke Hüneke. Carl was one of nine children, the middle of three boys. Johann Hüneke was a postal worker who died when Carl was nine years old.

Carl finished his formal schooling at fourteen and needed to find an apprenticeship. Carl had been drawing and painting since he was a small child and wanted to work somewhere art-related.

His mother was not able to find what Carl wanted in suburban Achim, so she traveled to the nearby city of Bremen and found a shop that made stained glass windows for churches and wealthy homes.

=== Training ===
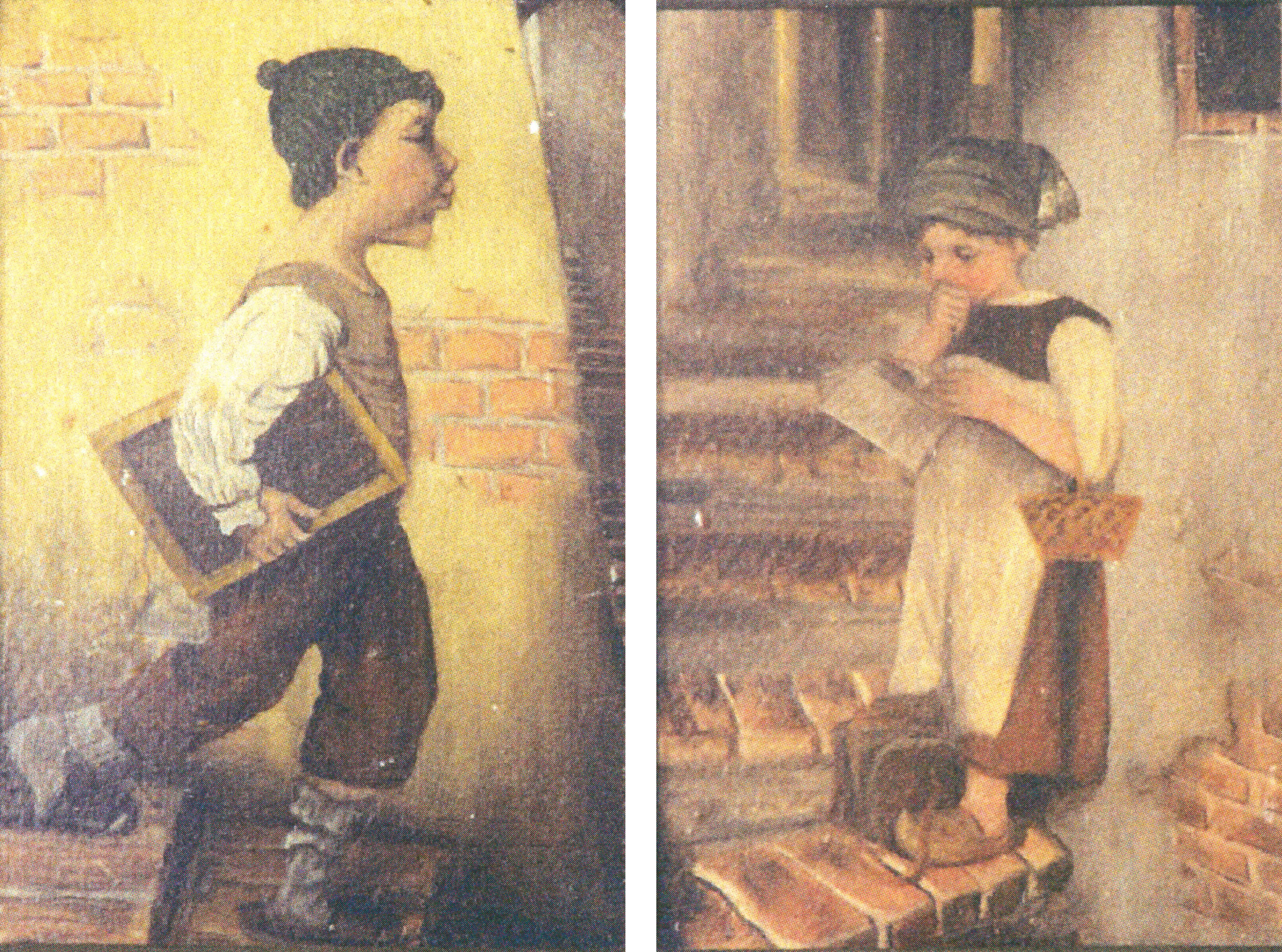
Oil Paintings – Schoolboy & Schoolgirl – Bremen 1913

In June 1912, Carl began his apprenticeship at Fritz Bauermann's stained glass shop in Bremen, Germany.

Carl learned all the basic operations of making stained glass windows. He poured lead into ingots; hand-operated the came lead machine, which turned the lead ingots into strips for stained glass production; cemented (waterproofed) the leaded glass and cut glass from patterns. Carl also learned how to lead, solder and install stained glass windows.

During Carl's apprenticeship, he attended art school at night. In class, Carl learned about dimension, perspective, proportion and balance of color.

Eventually, Carl was able to make designs and sketches for the windows, draw full sized cartoons, lay out the patterned drawings from which the glass is cut and finally paint and kiln-fire the colored glass.

In 1921, Carl Huneke received his craftsman certification papers and by 1922 his training was complete.

=== Immigration and the Great Depression ===
Due to the dire economic conditions in Germany in the aftermath of WWI, Carl left for America in 1925. After a short stop at Ellis Island, Carl took a train to meet cousins, already living in San Francisco.

Carl immediately started studying oil painting and English at night school, adapting well to his new environment. After some job-hunting, Carl began working for Edward La Potka at Church Art Glass Studio.

By the early 1930s, the Great Depression ended most stained glass work in San Francisco. Until opportunities were available again, Carl ran a small grocery store with his wife, Lee.

Only one opportunity for employment occurred during the depths of the depression. Charles Jay Connick designed and installed stained glass windows for Grace Cathedral in San Francisco. The world renowned Connick Studio was located in Boston, so Carl was hired out of the union hall in San Francisco to help install those windows.

That started a decades long relationship between the two artists and resulted in Carl installing Connick windows in several Bay Area churches over the next thirty years. It was Charles Connick who recommended to St. Vincent de Paul Church that Carl Huneke create their windows.

=== Century Stained Glass Studio ===
By the end of the 30s, stained glass jobs returned and Carl went back to work for Church Art Glass Studio. Carl became their principal artist.

After creating just two windows for a much larger commission at what is now the Cathedral of the Annunciation in Stockton, Church Art Glass Studio was fired.

The very demanding Monsignor William E. McGough had given specific instructions as to the color tone of the windows. He disliked the colors of the windows produced by Church Art Glass.

Monsignor McGough knew Carl also preferred windows with the brilliant blue characteristic of Chartres Cathedral. And, he liked Carl and his work. So, the monsignor insisted that Carl finish the windows in his church. With Edward La Potka's blessing, Carl took over the job and started his own business, launching the Century Stained Glass Studio.

From the studio's launch in 1942 to Carl Huneke's death in 1972, Century Stained Glass Studio created, installed and maintained stained glass windows in churches, chapels, convents, schools, hotels and hospitals.

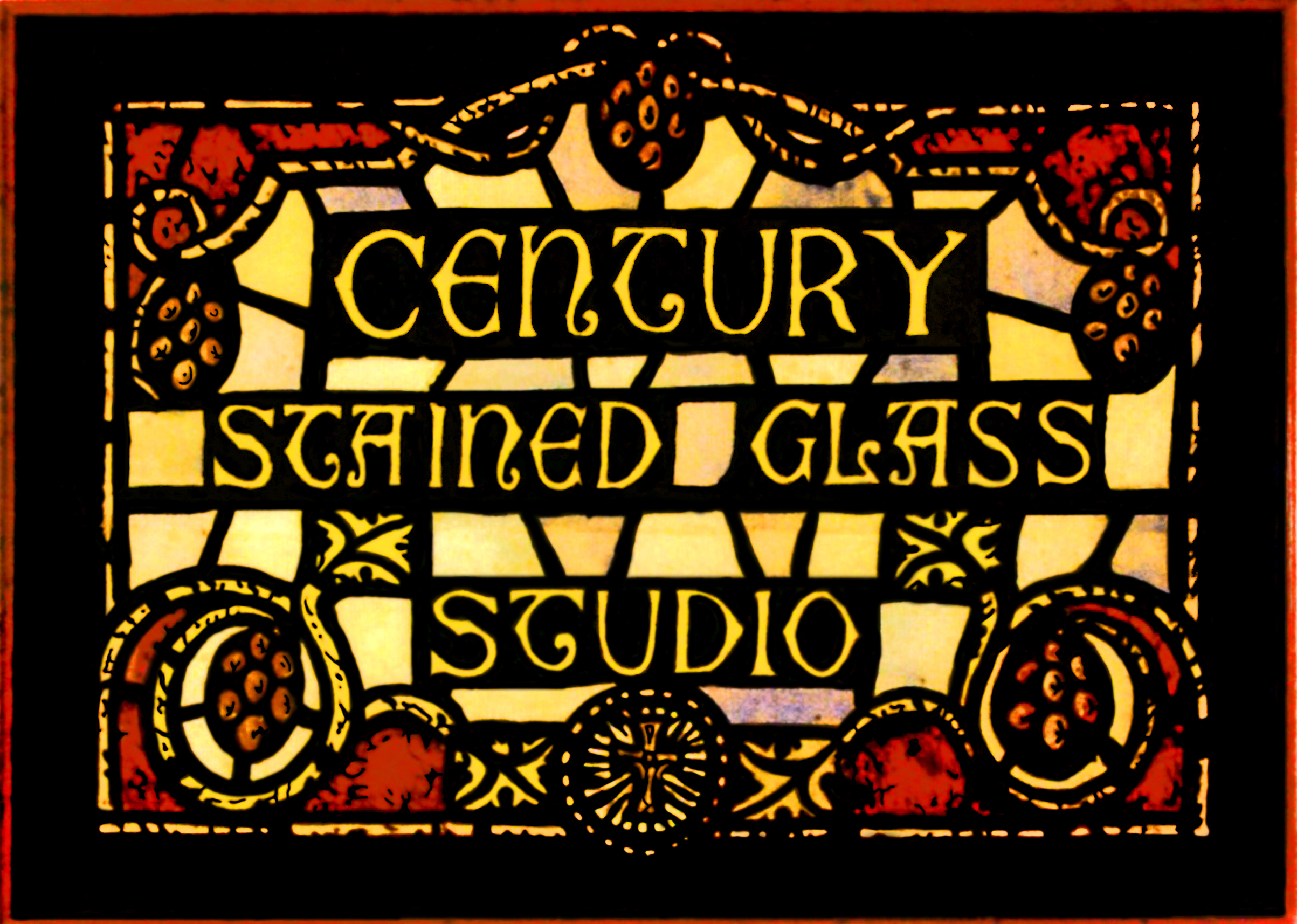

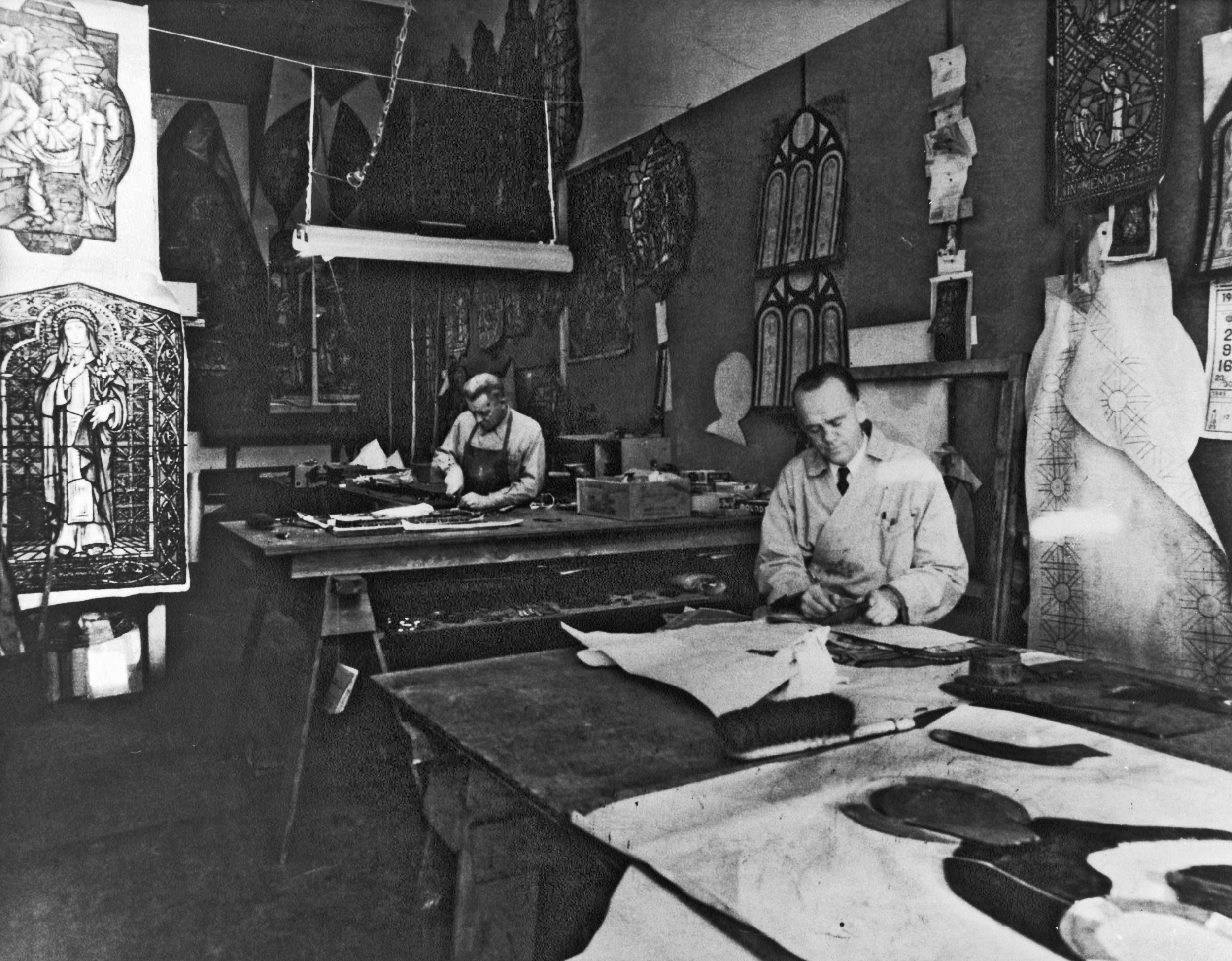
1953 – Century Stained Glass Studio

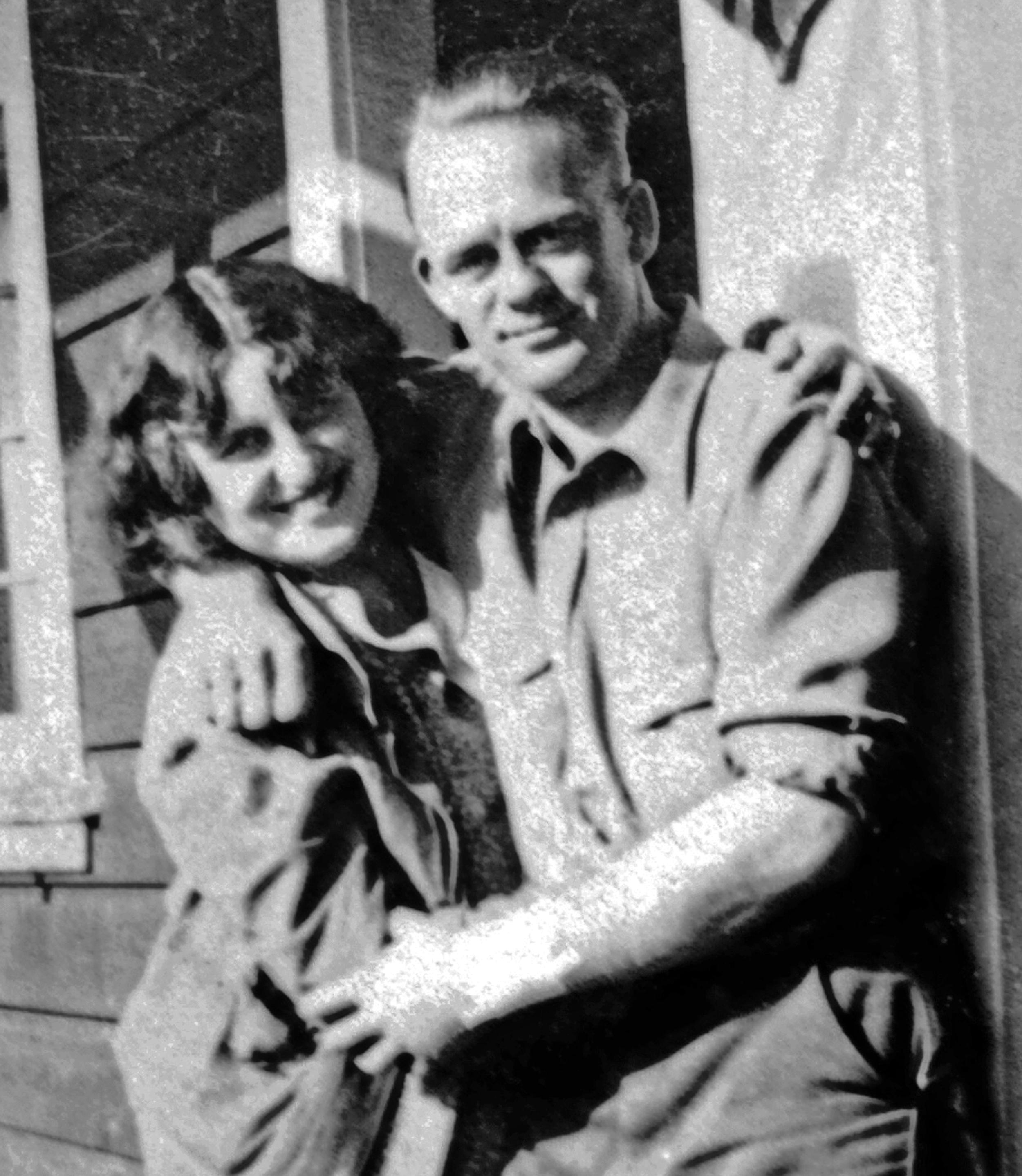
Carl and Lee – 1932 – Mill Valley, California

=== Personal life ===
In 1935, Huneke married Vienna-born Leopoldine (Lee) Tham and became stepfather to her son, Rudy Tham. Carl and Lee had a daughter of their own, Margaret Lee Huneke Blaine (Marge). Carl was a devoted husband, father, step-father and grandfather.

Early in his marriage to Carl's daughter Marge, Carl's son-in-law, Terry Blaine, helped Carl in his studio. A love of Carl's artwork and process developed and Terry spent years photographing Carl's windows. Together with Marge, they have preserved many of Carl's business documents and original drawings.

Several of Carl's stained glass windows and oil paintings are in his family's homes today, enjoyed by Carl and Lee's children, grandchildren and now great-grandchildren.

== Work ==
=== Huneke's Techniques ===
==== Leaded stained glass ====
On a rigid frame, pieces of cut, colored glass were arranged into a design and held together with strips of lead. The pieces of cathedral glass were relatively thin (about 1/8" thick) and flat compared to thicker faceted glass pieces.

==== Faceted Glass – Dalle de Verre ====
On a rigid frame, pieces of cut, colored glass were arranged into a design and epoxy was poured into the frame to set the glass. The pieces of glass were cut three-dimensionally and could sometimes be much larger than pieces for leaded stained glass.

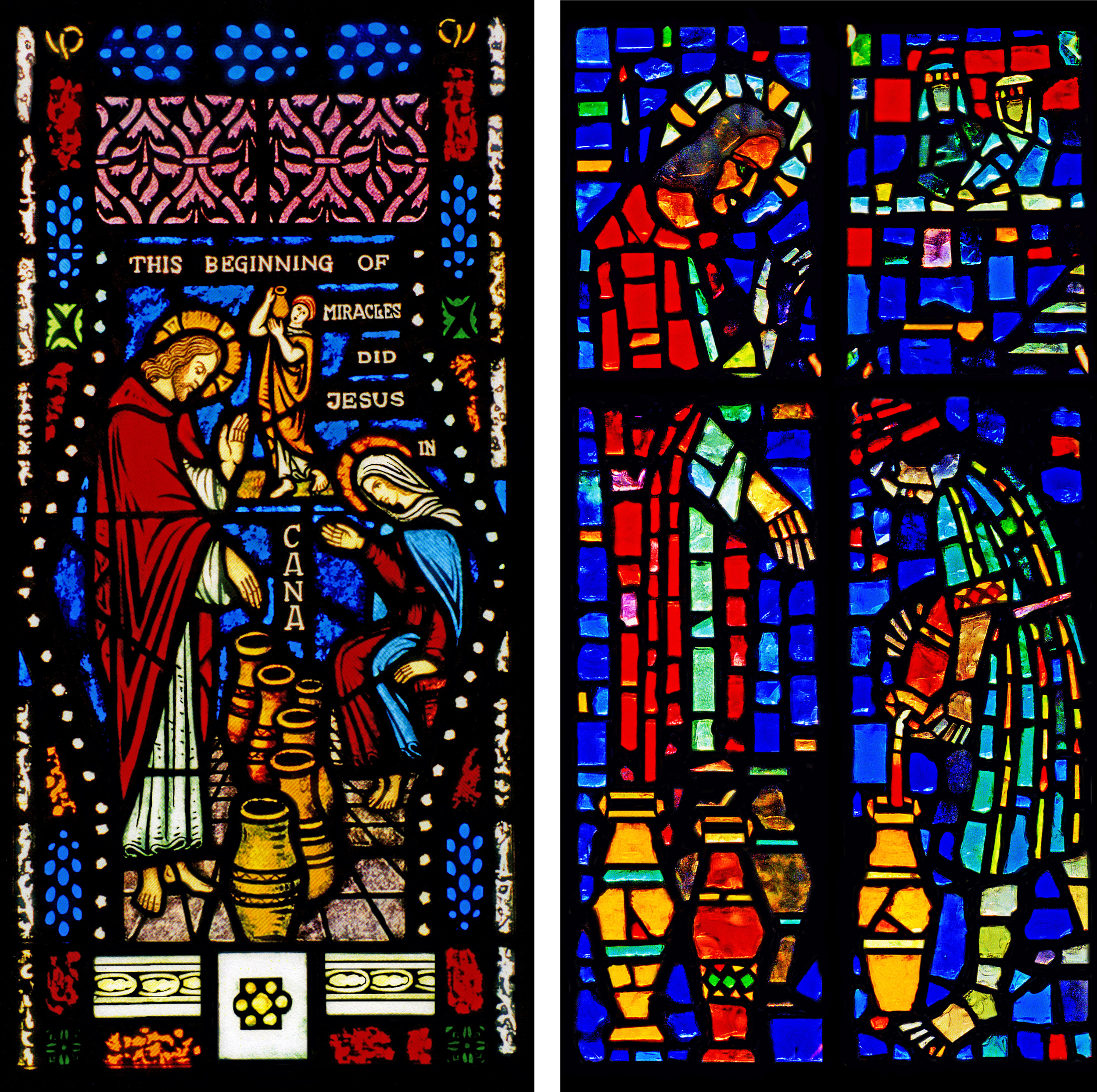
Miracle at Cana - Stained Glass vs. Faceted Glass

=== Carl's Leaded Stained Glass Process ===
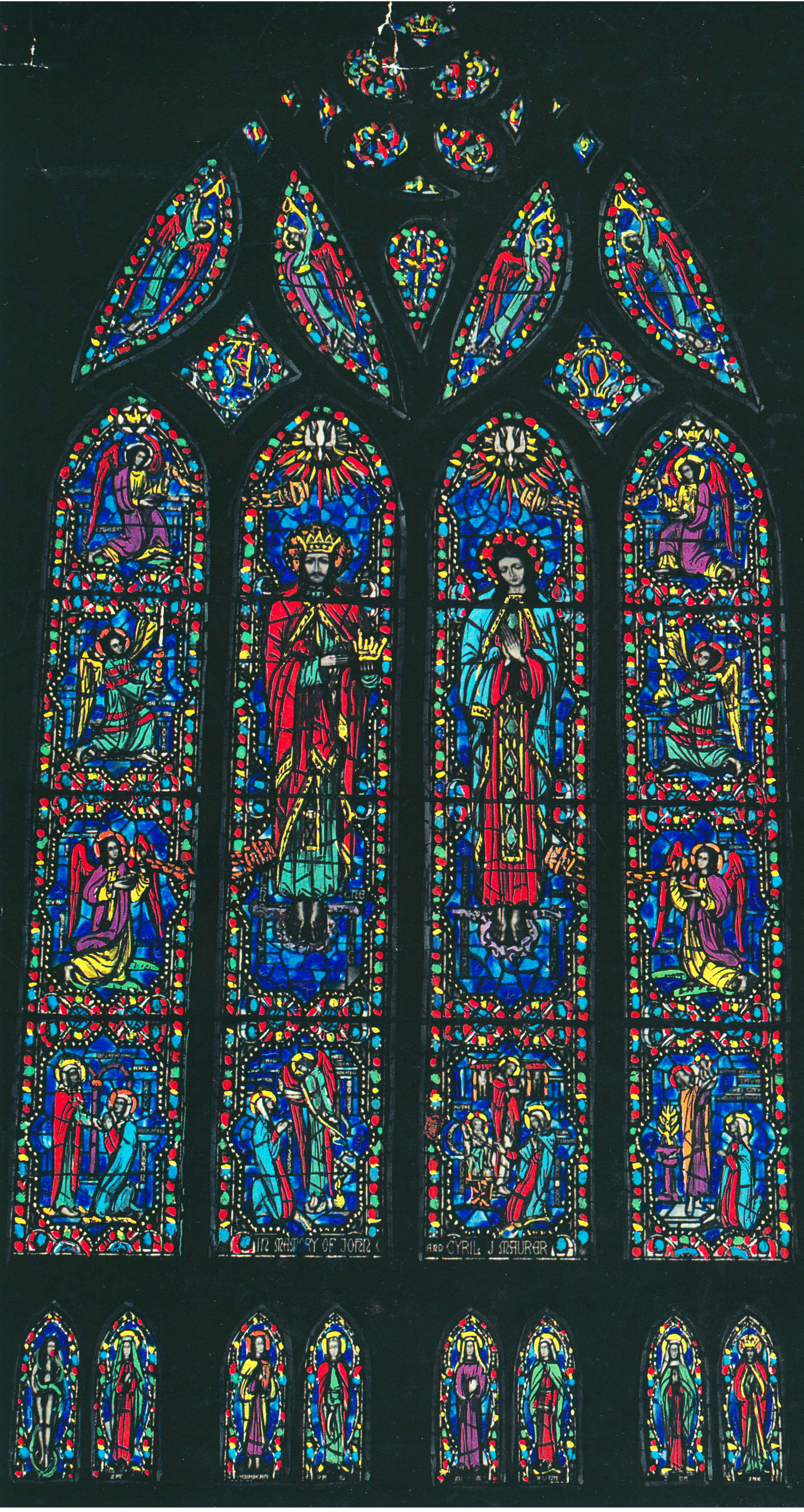
Cartoon – The Coronation – Cathedral of the Annuciation, Stockton

Preliminary Pencil Sketches

Carl made preliminary pencil sketches of the subject of the window. They were small in scale, meant to convey an impression of the full-sized window.

Cartoons

Carl's full size cartoons were the design for the finished stained glass window on a template the size of the window opening. These full size cartoons had the size and shape of each individual piece of stained glass laid out in a pattern.

Cutline Drawings

From the cartoon, Carl made cutline drawings with lead-lines outlining where the individual pieces of glass were to be placed.

Pattern Drawings

Carl's pattern drawings were a replica of the cutline drawing. The pattern drawings were cut where the lead-lines went. Those cuts removed a narrow strip of paper, allowing for the exact space of the lead between the pieces of glass.

Cutting

A sheet of glass with the desired color was selected from the raw stock. The thickness of the sheet of glass was approximately 1/8".

The cutter placed the pattern on the glass and with a handheld glass cutter, cut the glass to the shape of the pattern.

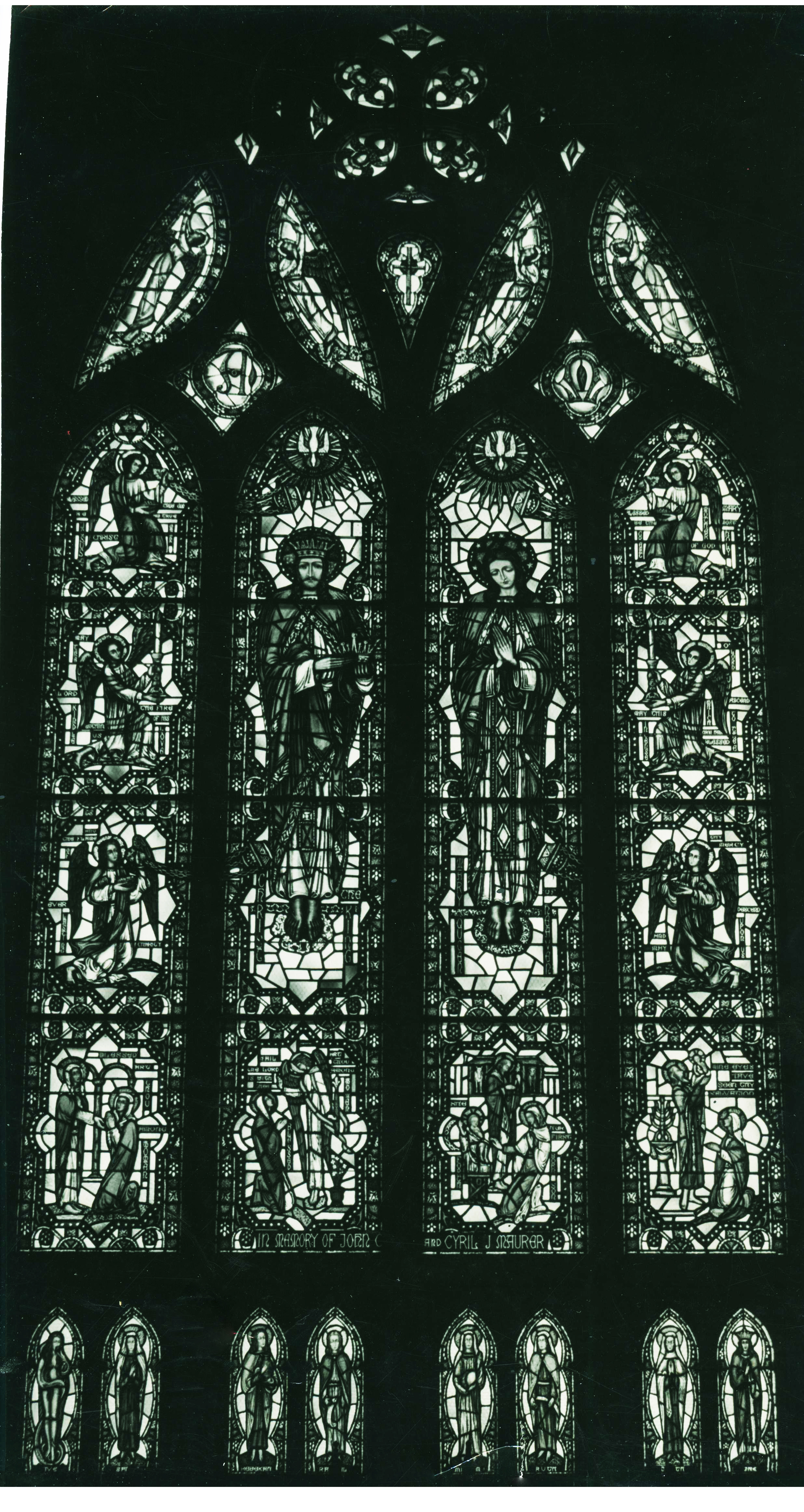
Cutline Drawing – The Coronation – Cathedral of the Annuciation, Stockton

Painting

On the pieces of newly cut glass, Carl used vitrifiable paint to draw the main outlines of the cartoon. When glass is fired in a kiln, the vitrifiable paint fuses with the glass, to provide shading or color variations.

Patterning was added in halftone mattes, controlling how much light shines through the glass as well as harmonizing colors. To approximate the light which would shine through the glass, much of this painting was done on a plate glass easel with the pieces held by beeswax.

Since his easel was only large enough for one panel at a time, the full window could only be seen when it was installed.

Firing

The painted pieces of glass were fired in the kiln to fuse the paint into the glass. Sometimes more firings were required to properly achieve the shading or color variation desired.

Glazing

A glazier spread the cutline drawing on a glazier's bench. Laths were nailed down along two edges of the drawing to form a right angle.

Long strips of wide lead were placed along the inside edges of the laths. Each piece of glass belonging in the angle was fitted into the grooved lead.

This process continued until all the lead and each piece of glass was placed in the cutline drawing.

Soldering

The many joints formed by the lead were soldered.

Cementing

The nearly complete stained glass window was set by rubbing putty on both sides to make it firm and watertight.

Delivery and Installation

Before any window left the shop, Carl did a final inspection of each panel on an upright glass easel.

Large stained glass windows were made in sections to make it easy for one person to handle. The sections were packed and shipped to their destination, where they were installed and secured by reinforcing bars.

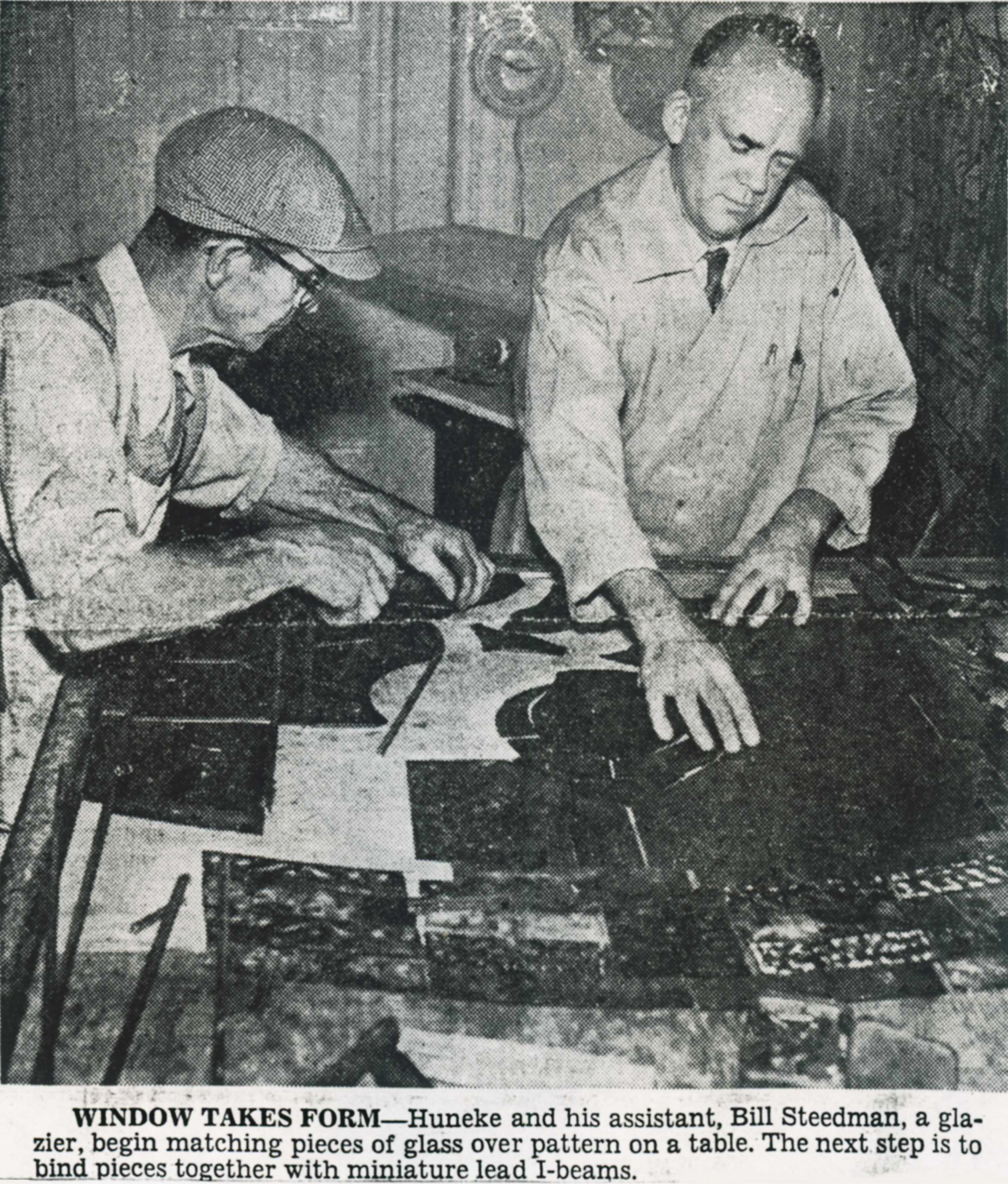

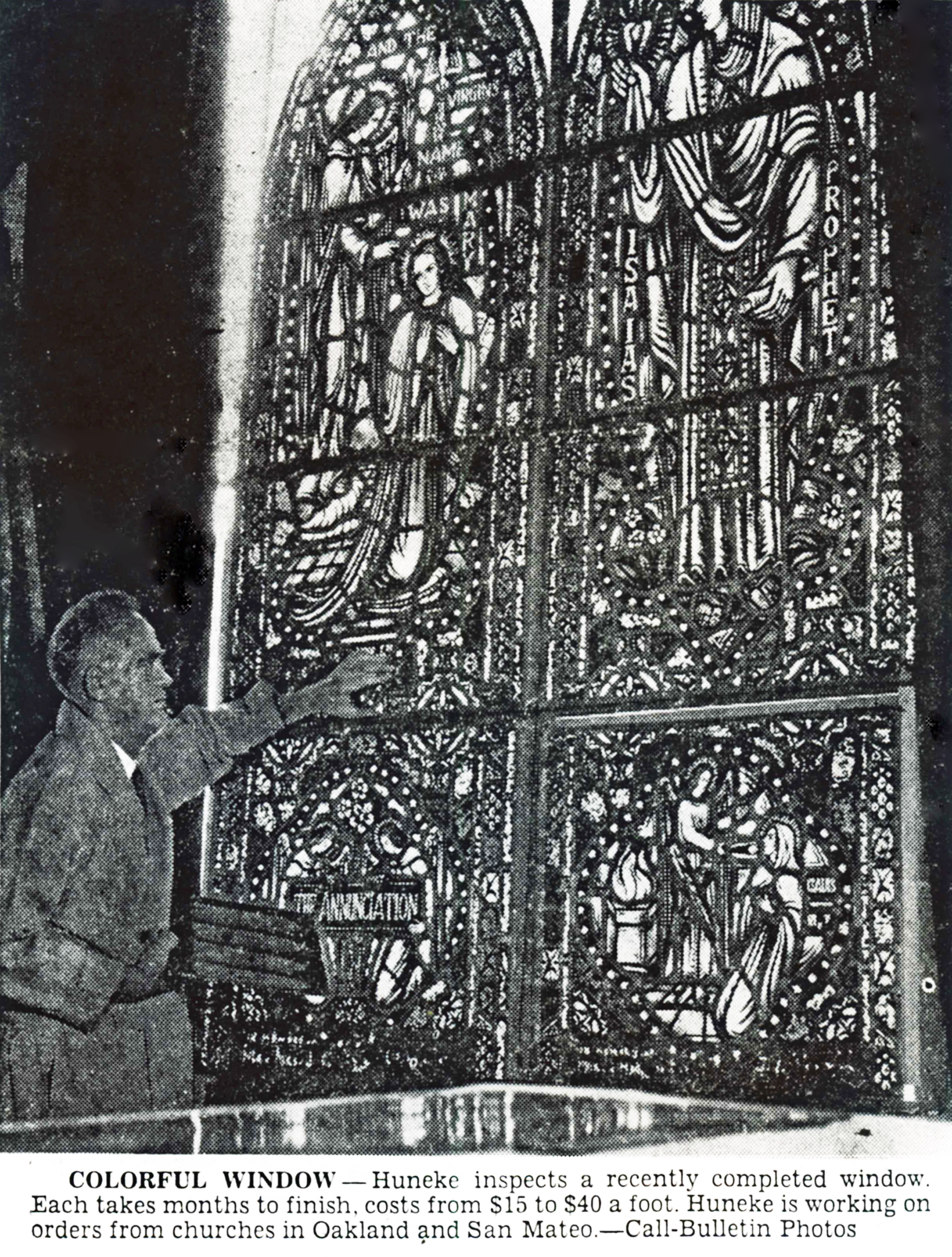

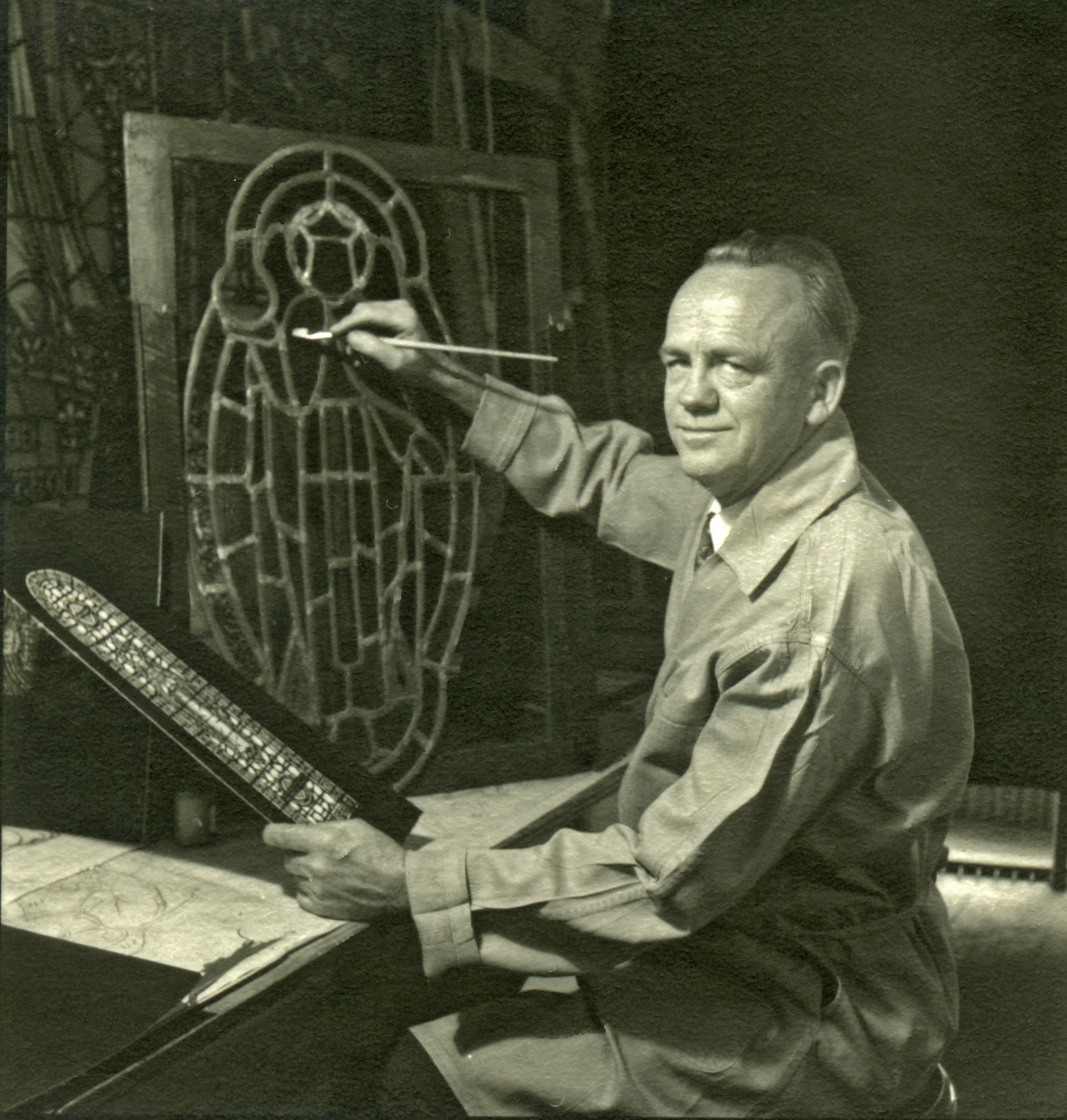
1953 Carl Huneke

=== Carl's Faceted Glass Process ===
The dalle de verre (Glass Slab) technique was developed in France in the 1930s.

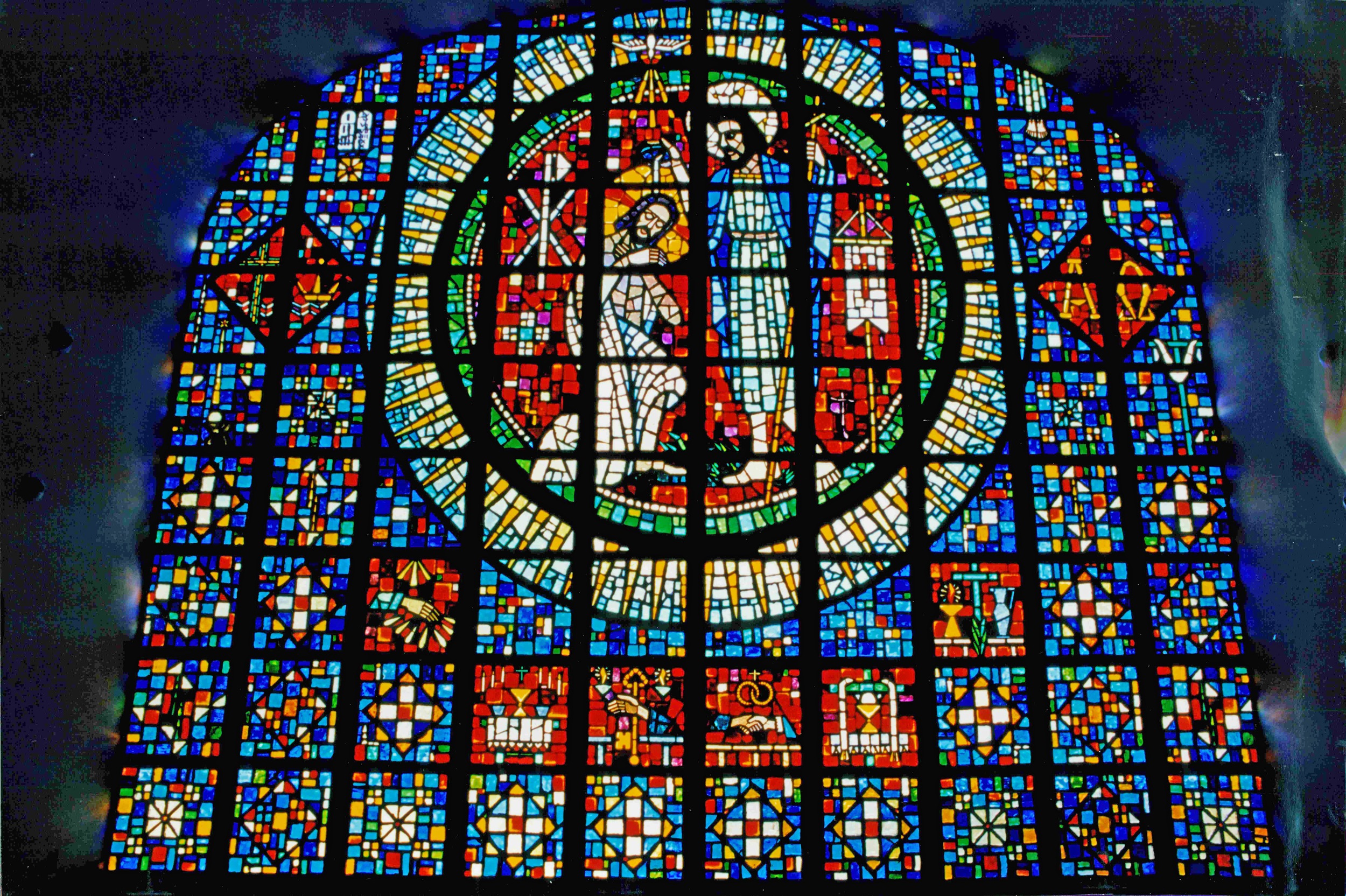
The Baptism of Jesus – Holy Spirit Church, Fremont, California

To create a more modern look, thick dalle de verre glass is used and is faceted by chipping the surface and edges.

The faceted glass creates dramatic effects when sunlight shines through the window, adding brilliant life to the mosaic designs.

This technique allows for extremely large windows. It is possible to cover an entire wall with this vivid art form.

By the mid-1950s, French designers were using this technique in American buildings. By the end of the 50s, Carl was intrigued and decided to start experimenting.

Carl used a matrix of high strength epoxy after trying concrete. The epoxy produced a much stronger panel which was also lighter, more weather resistant and allowed much more glass edge to be exposed, enhancing the brilliance of the window.

The epoxy color was also a more pleasing natural stone color and could be sanded on the inside with light-colored Monterrey sand.

Carl and many of his customers were pleased with the results and Carl became one of the first American stained glass artists to produce faceted dalle de verre windows commercially.

Preliminary Pencil Sketches

Miniature pencil sketches of each window were made in proportions which could be expanded to the full size of the window.

Carl would often make several copies of each drawing, sometimes with colored pencils.

Carl would draw different combinations until he found the optimum balance of light and dark, color and contrast and a pleasing composition of the scene.

Cartoons

Cartoons, the full-sized window plans, served as a guide for the finished faceted glass window. The size and shape of each piece of glass were selected. The cartoon often had a splash of watercolor indicating the color of each piece.

For large windows, a cartoon was created for each panel.

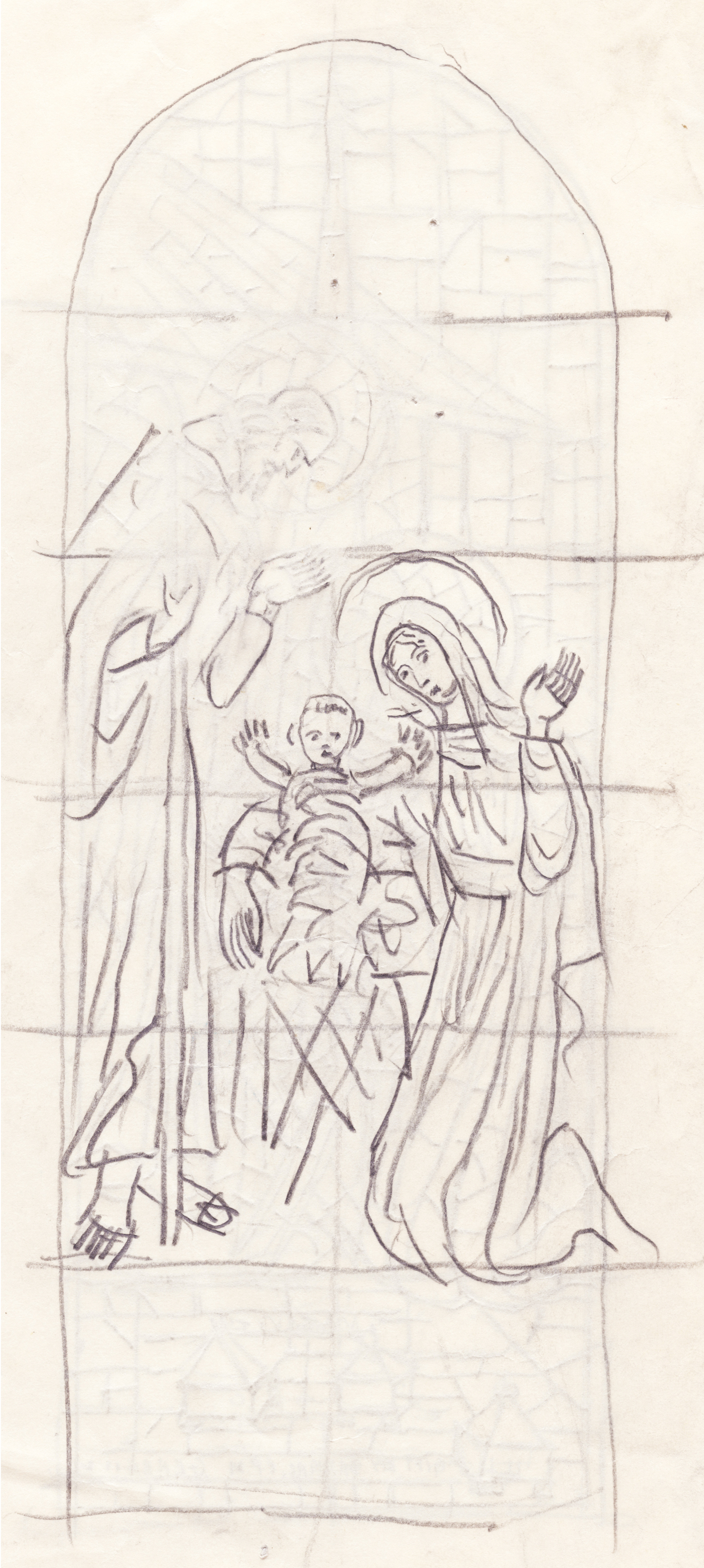
Pencil Sketch - The Nativity

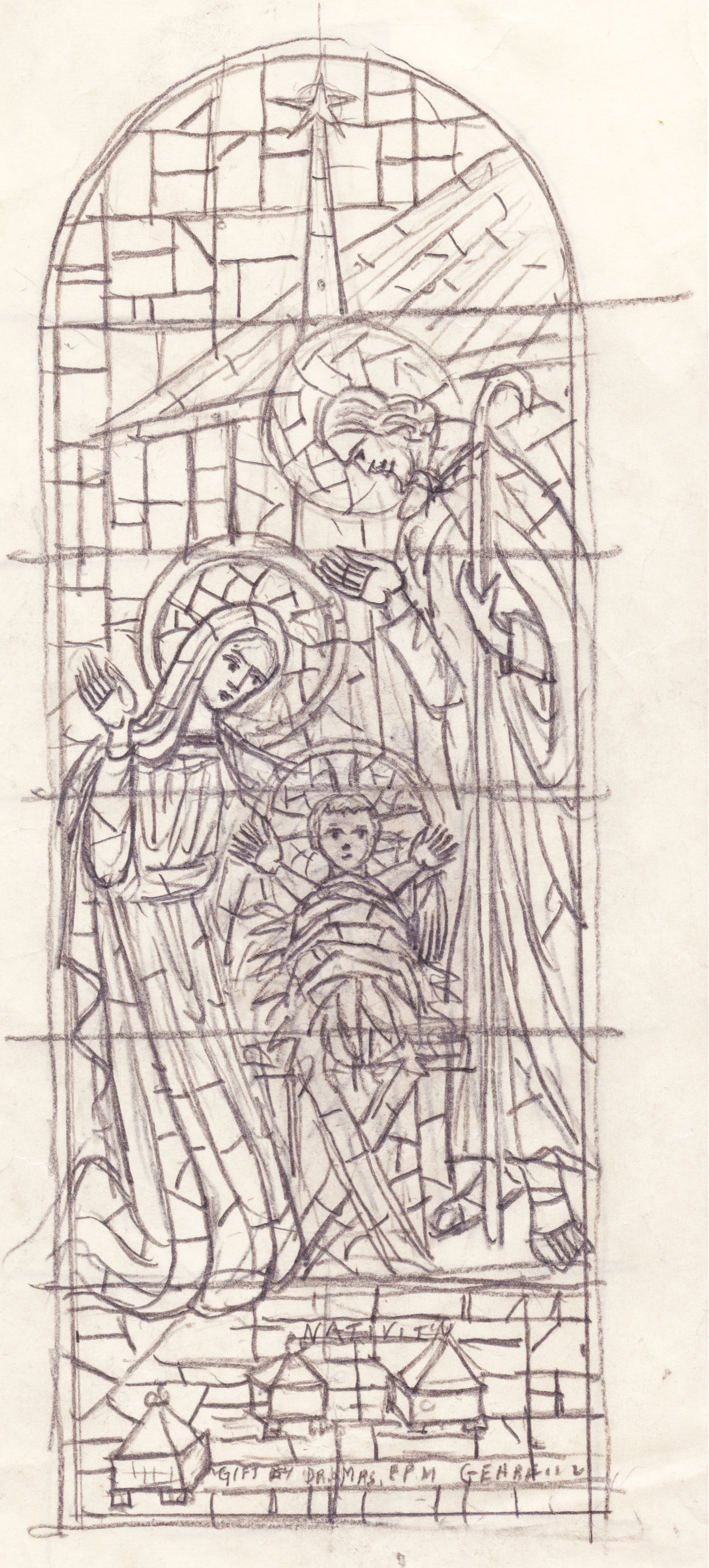
Pencil Sketch - The Nativity

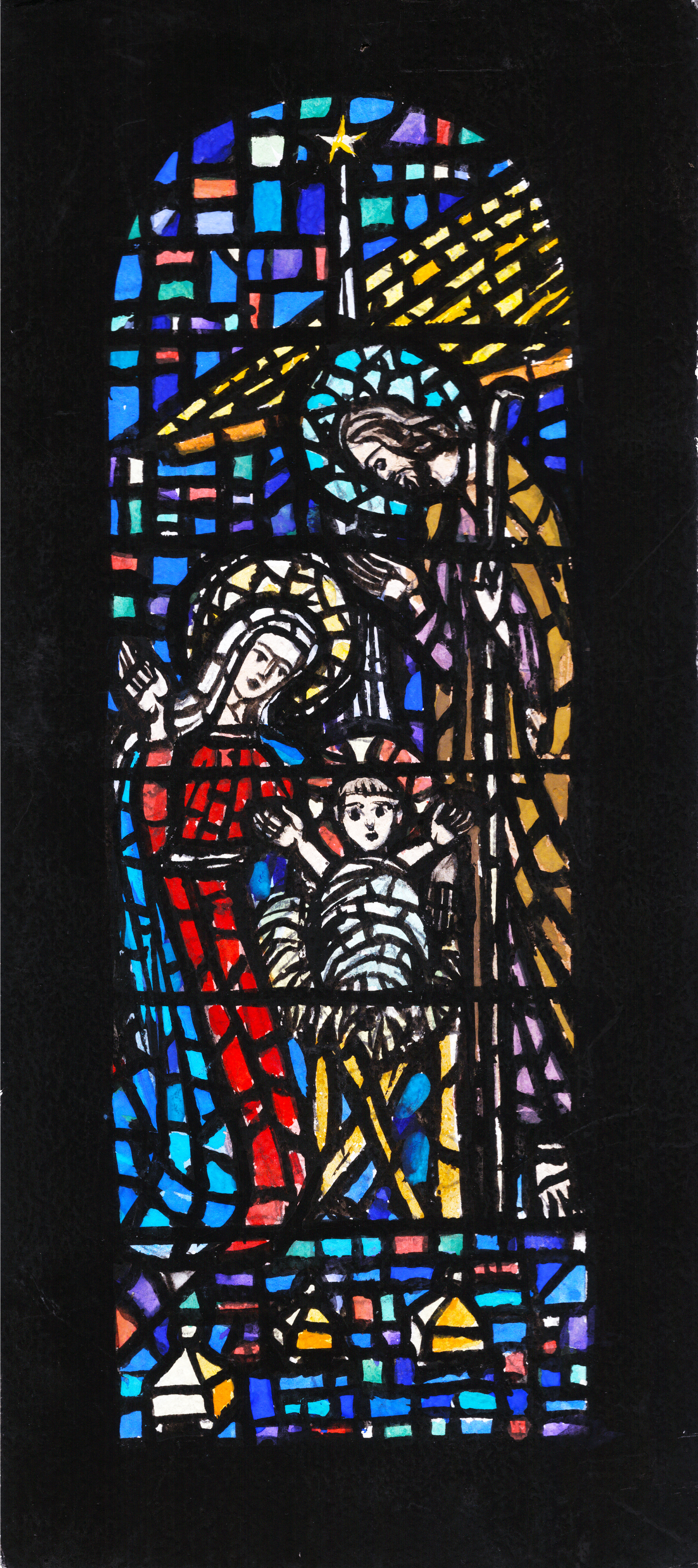
Cartoon - The Nativity

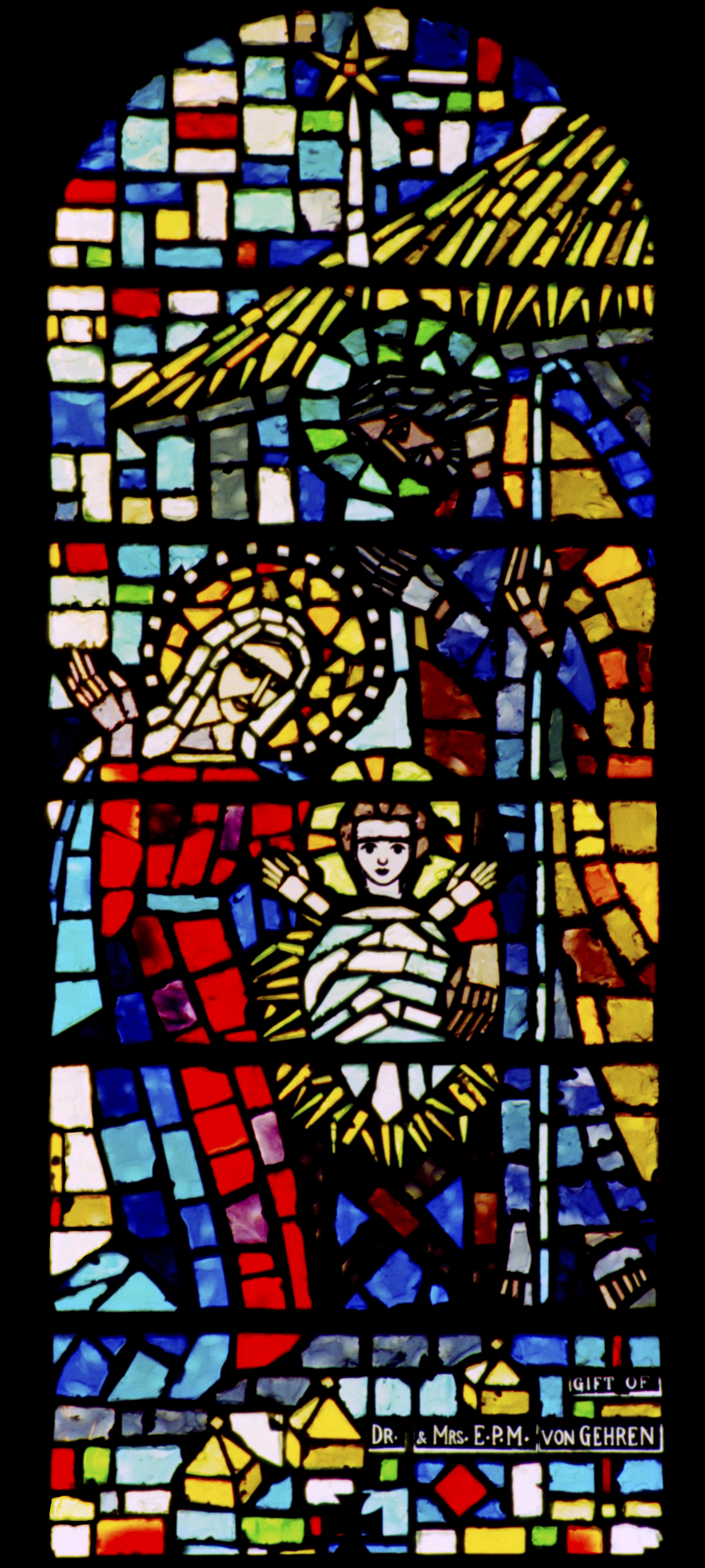
The Nativity - St. Stephen Church, San Francisco, CA

Patterning

A 1' wood frame was made with the exact outside dimensions of the cartoon. A transparent sheet of plastic was cut to the same size. The cartoon was placed on a work table. The plastic was taped to the cartoon and the frame was nailed to the cartoon and plastic, holding them firmly in place.

Cutting

Slabs (Dalles) of glass with the desired color were selected from a raw stock. The dalles were approximately 8"x12"x1". The dalles were shaped with a diamond saw or a glass cutter. Facets were created with a hammer by striking the edges of the glass pieces.

Chipping thick glass in this way created conchoidal fractures. Those fractures refracted light, producing a brilliant gem-like depth.

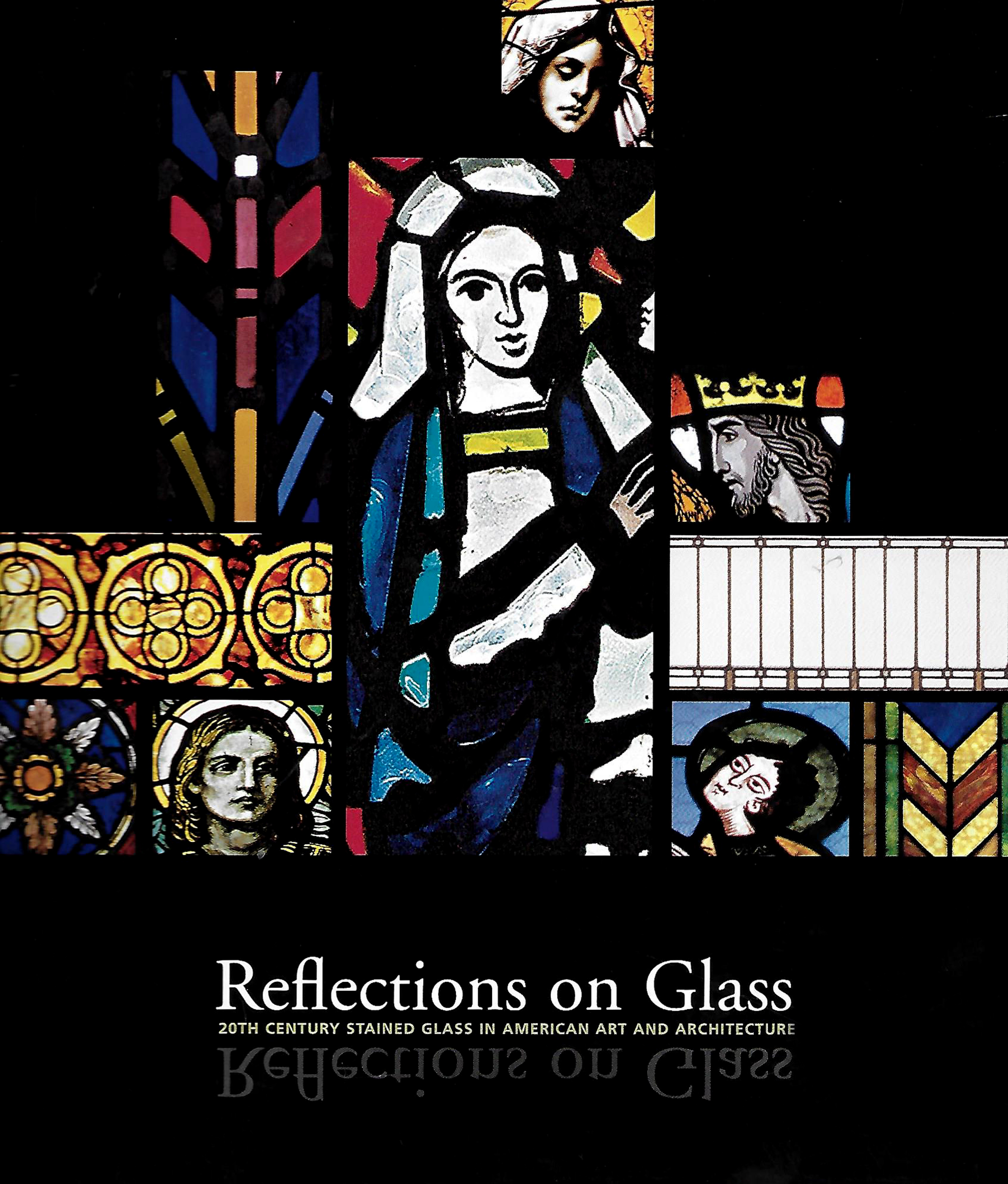

For detail work such as faces, Carl used the edge of a diamond saw blade with multiple cuts, followed by lateral smoothing. That technique produced smooth, curved, concave edges. Small pieces were also cut to shape with the diamond saw.

Assembly

All the faceted glass pieces were arranged precisely on the cartoon to assess the finished composition. Each piece was then individually lifted out and liquid latex was applied to the bottom. The piece was then glued directly onto the plastic sheet overlaying the cartoon, in its final location.

Epoxy was poured between the glass pieces and allowed to harden, usually a full day and night. The glass was then thoroughly cleaned.

Delivery and Installation

Once any of Carl's windows was complete, the delivery and installation routines were basically the same. A final inspection and then sections of the windows were shipped and installed.

== Exhibitions ==
Reflections on Glass: 20th Century Stained Glass in American Art and Architecture: The Gallery at the American Bible Society, 13 December 2002 – 15 March 2003

== Gallery ==
=== Leaded Stained Glass ===
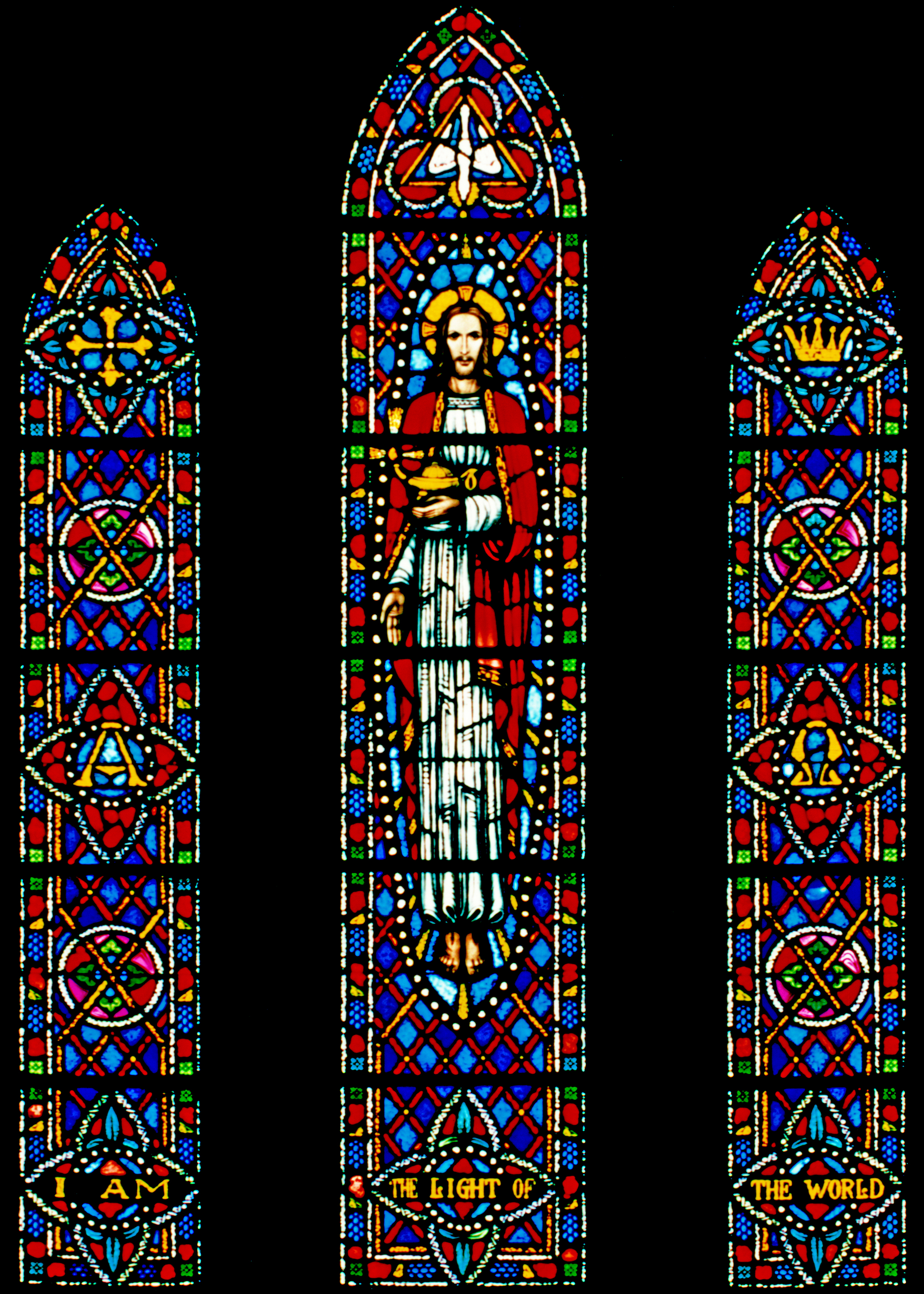
I Am The Light of the World - Compass Church, Salinas

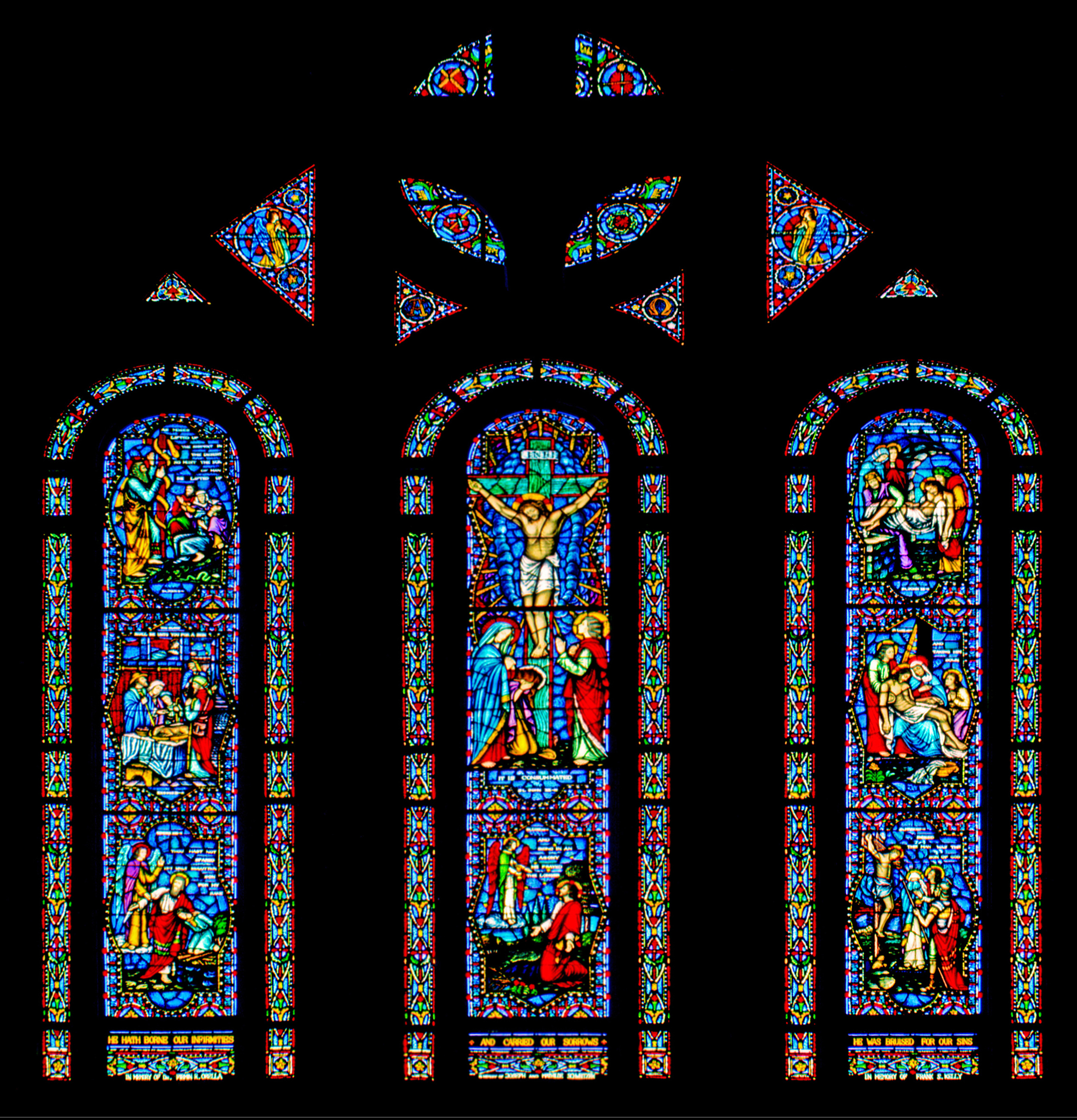
The Crucifixion - St. Vincent de Paul Church, San Francisco

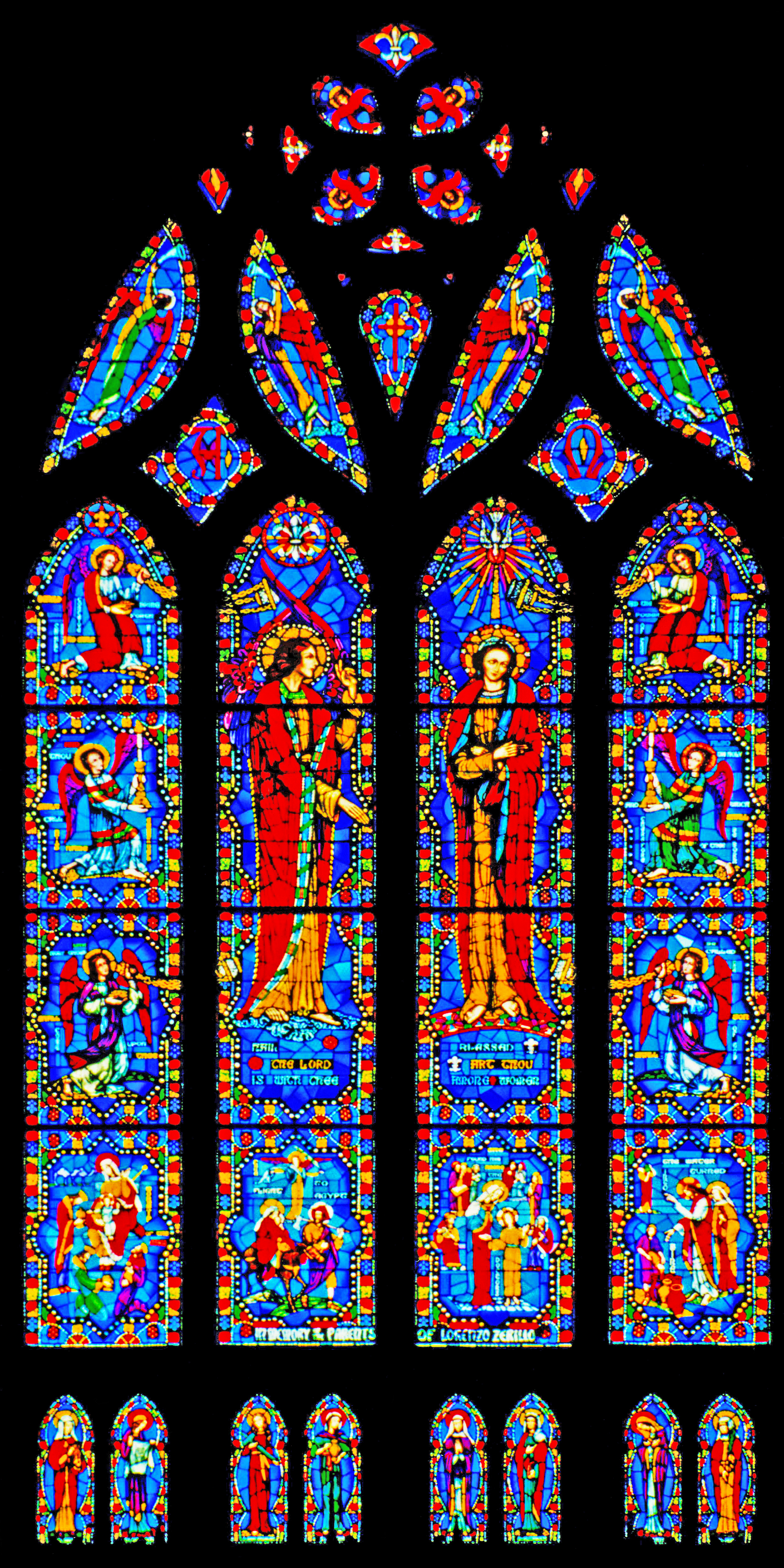
The Annunciation - Cathedral of the Annunciation, Stockton
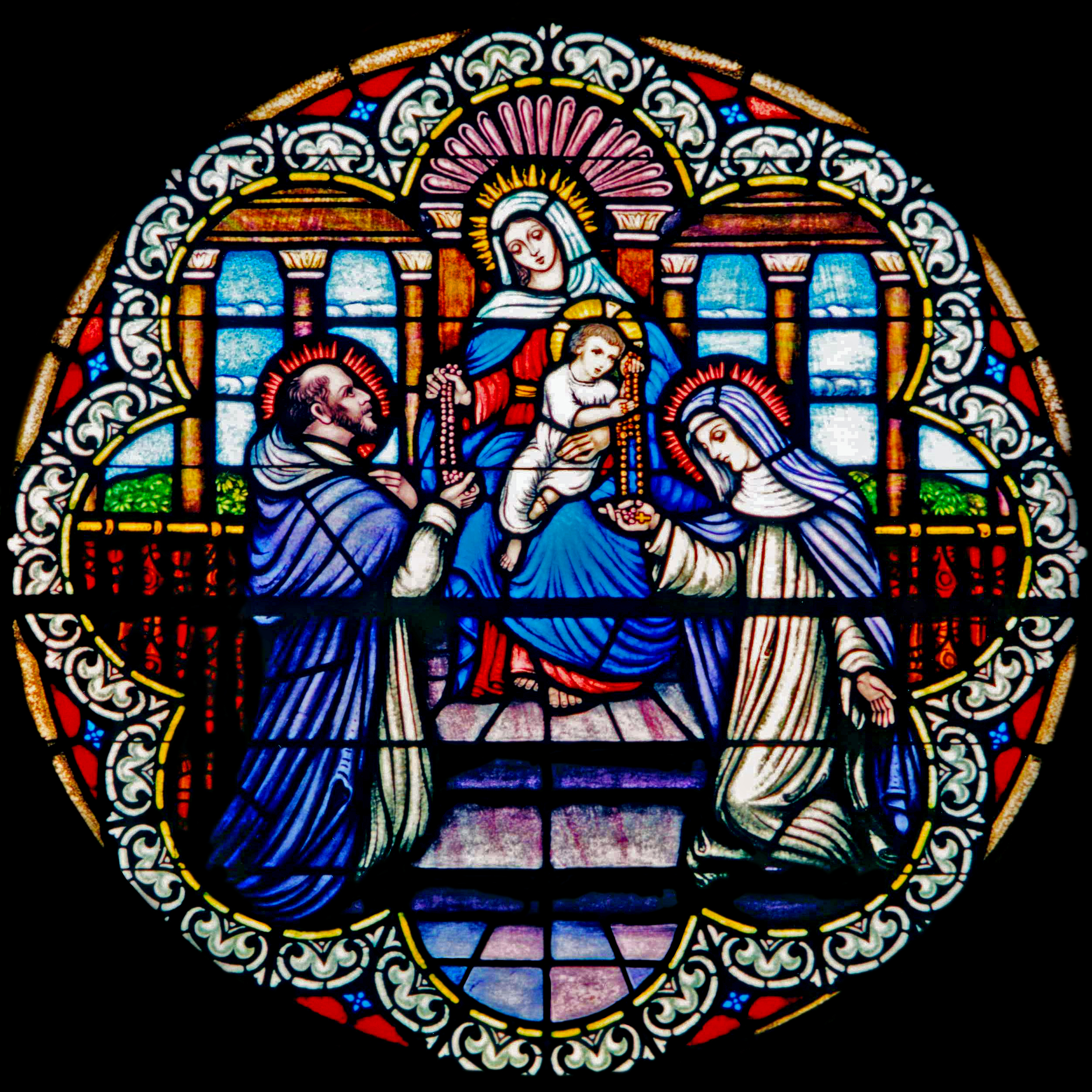
St. Dominic & St. Catherine - Dominican Sisters of Mission San Jose, San Jose

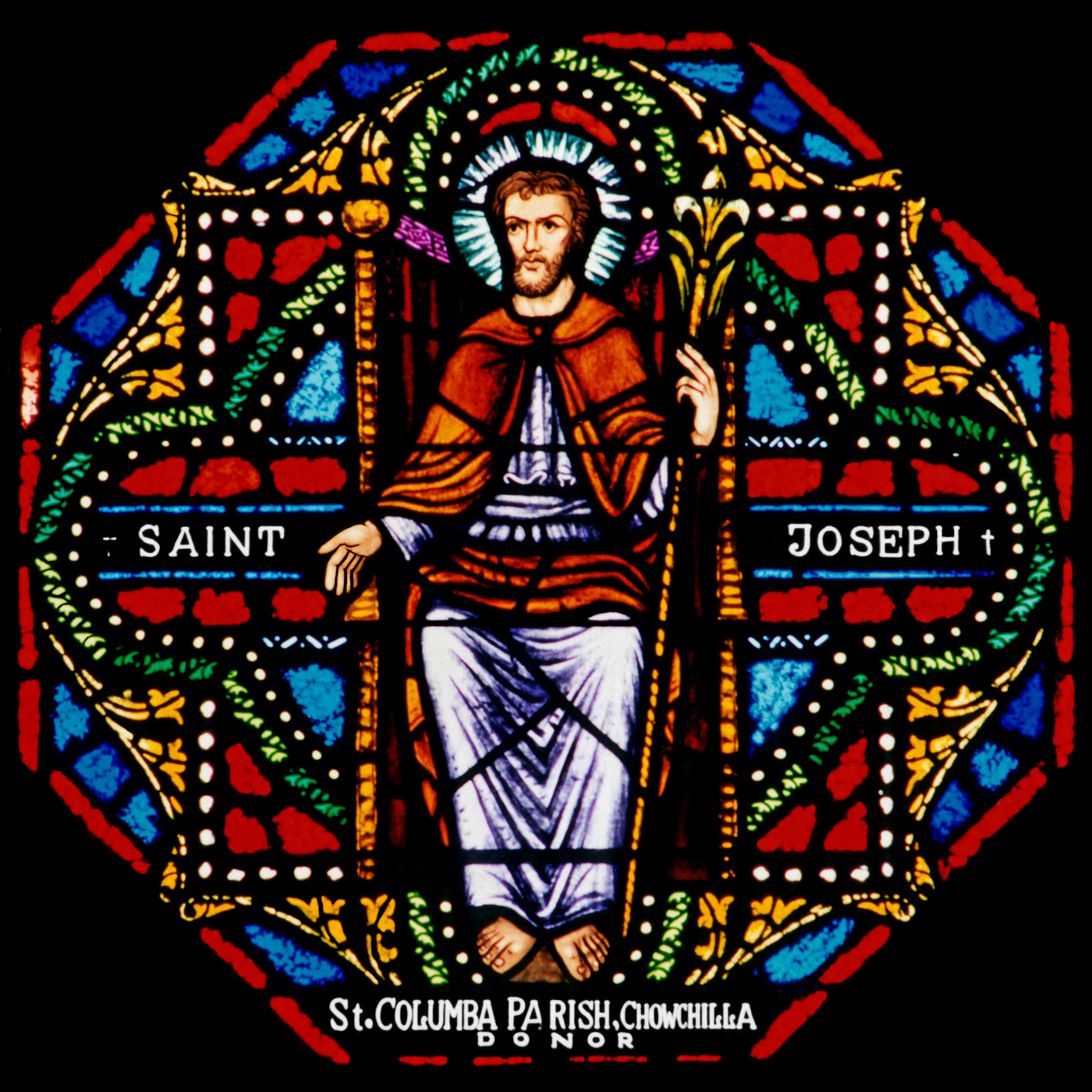
St. Joseph - St. Anne's Chapel, Fresno

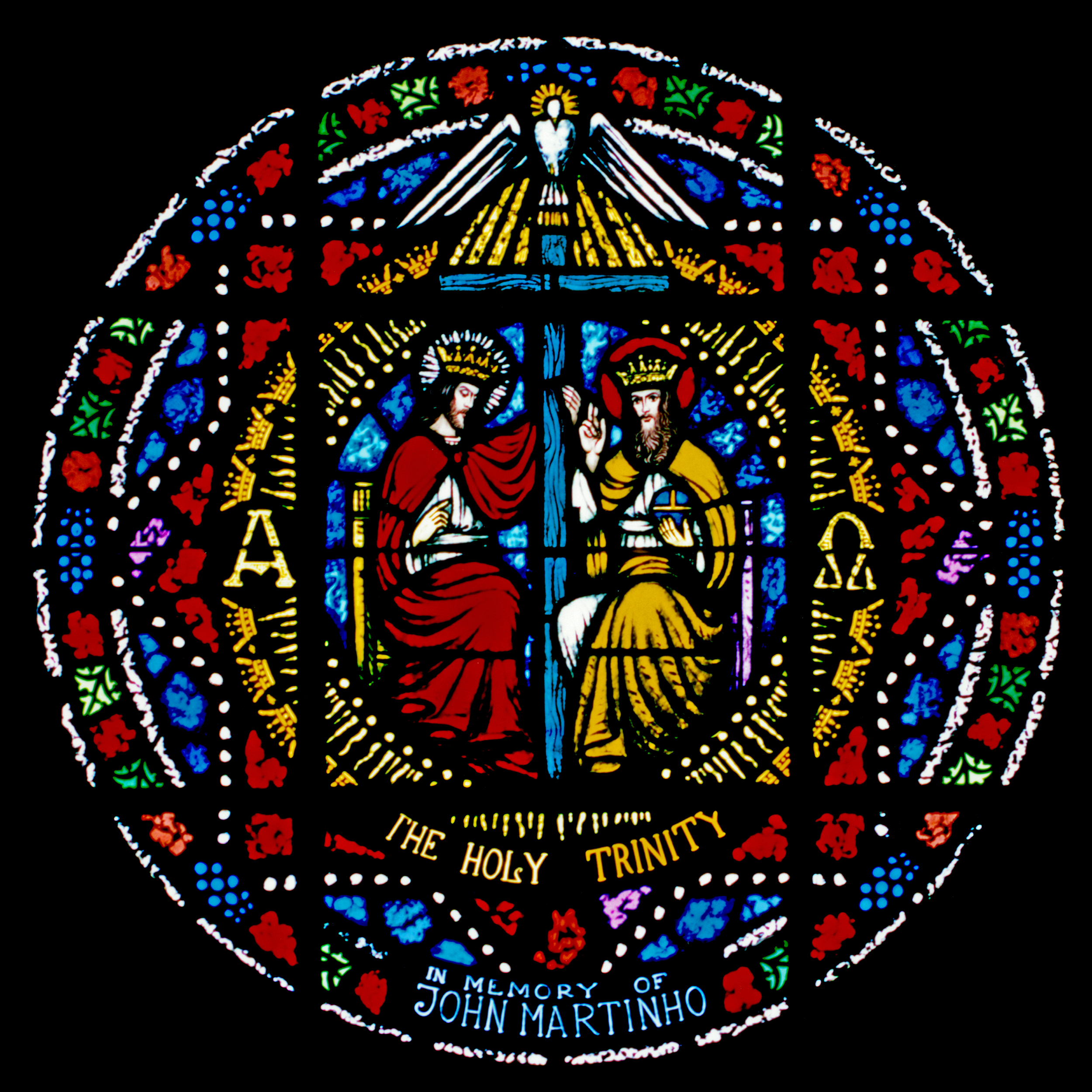
The Holy Trinity - St. Jarlath Catholic Church, Oakland

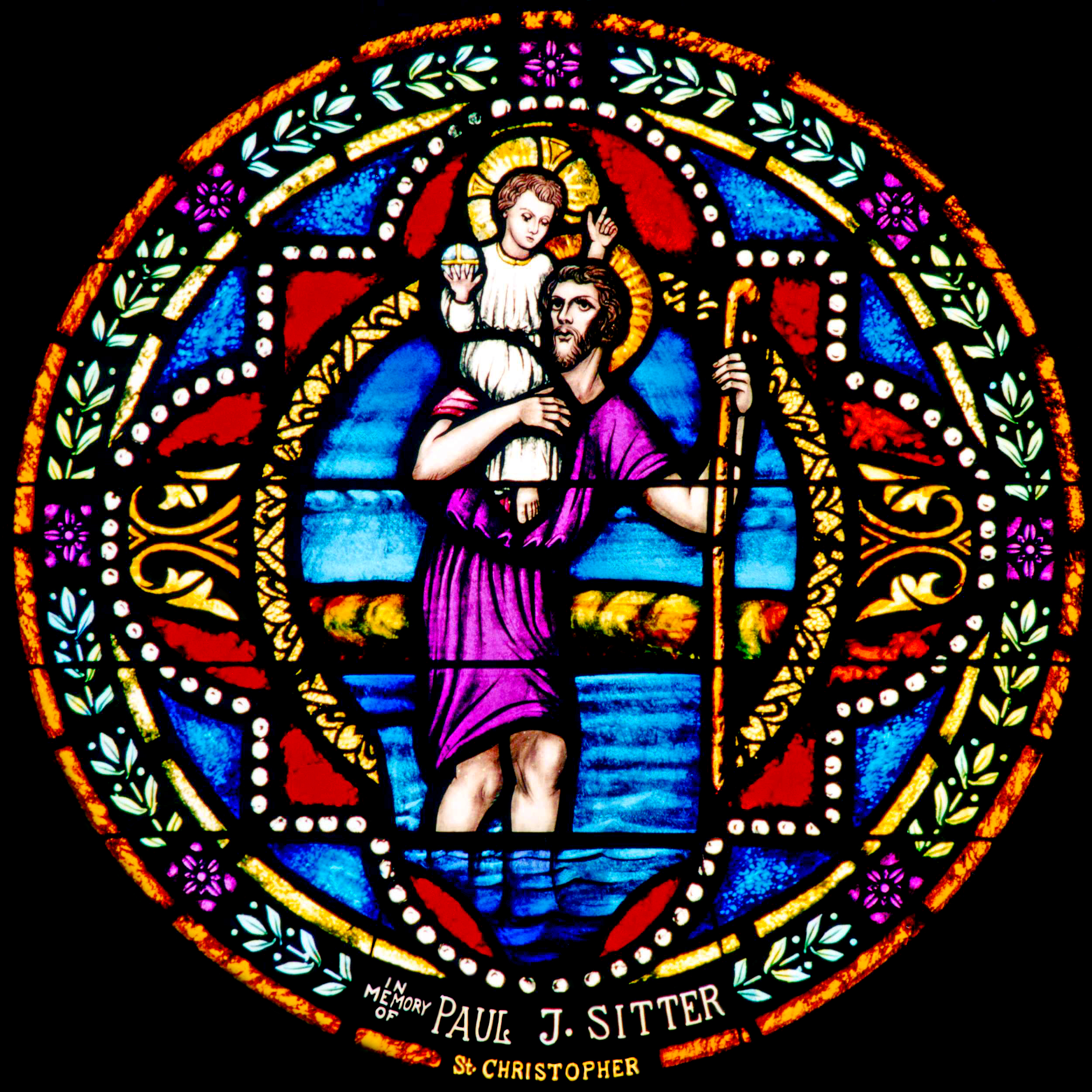
St. Christopher - St. Joan of Arc Church, Yountville

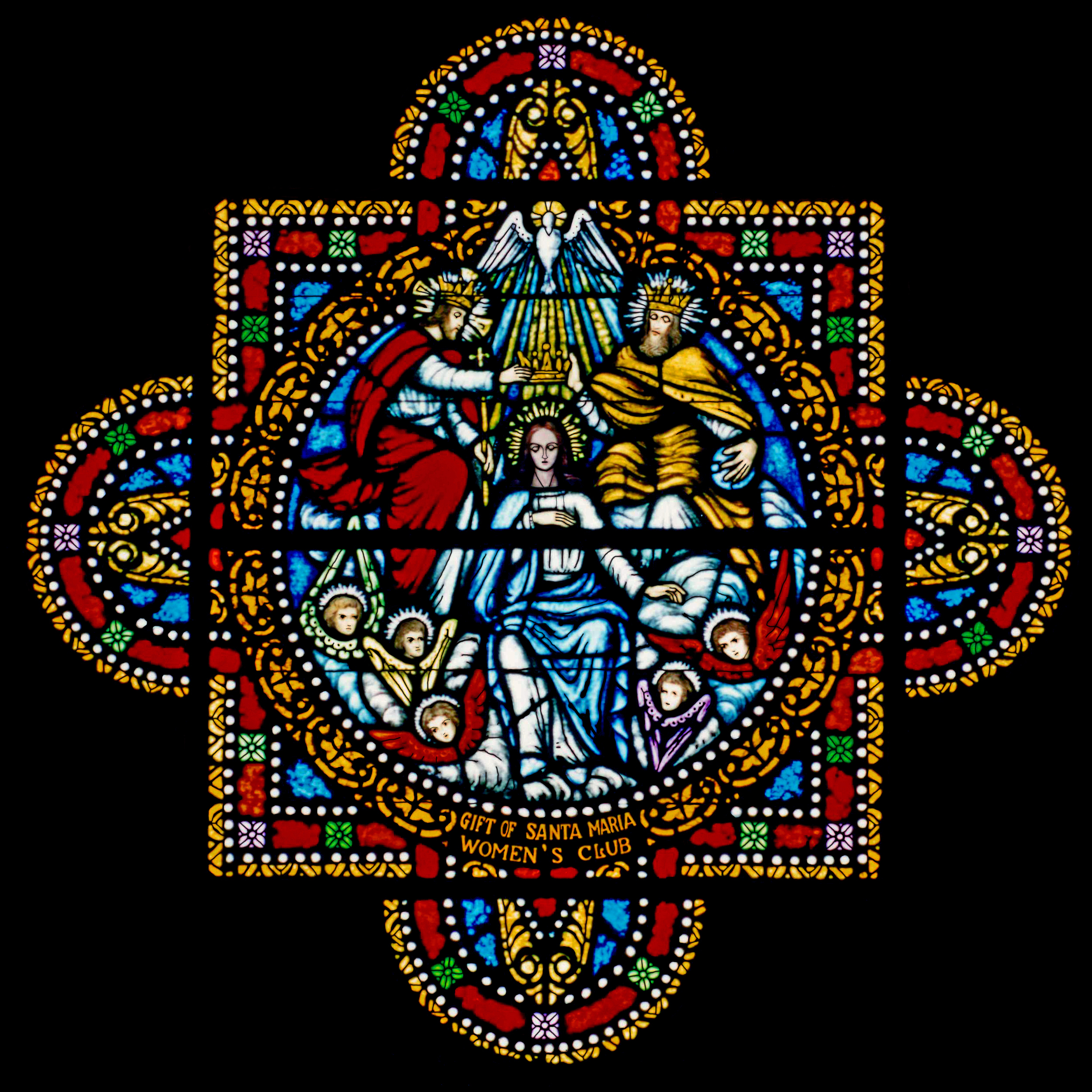
Santa Maria - Santa Maria Church, Orinda
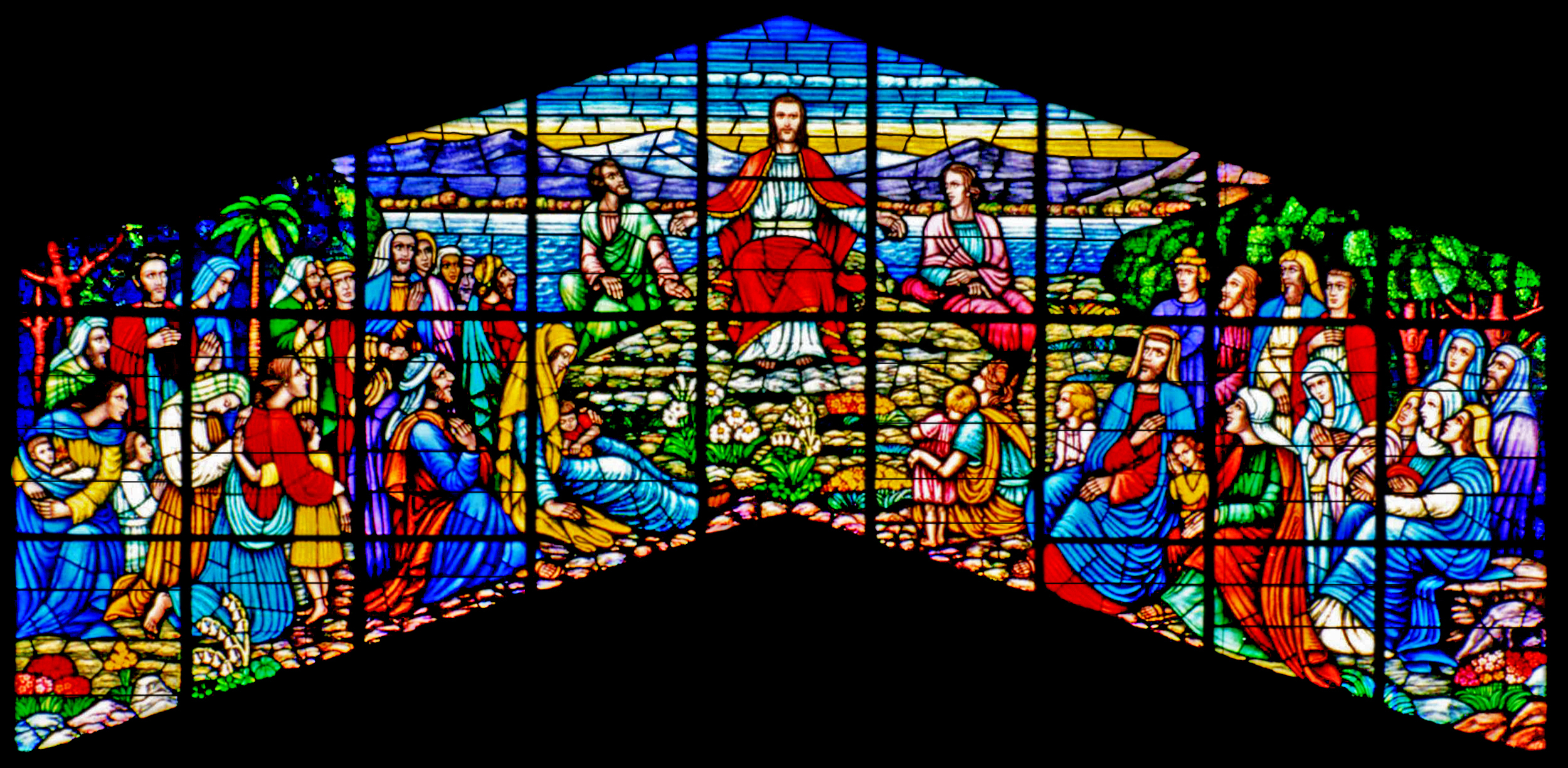
Christ Preaching to the Multitudes - Saratoga Federated Church, Saratoga

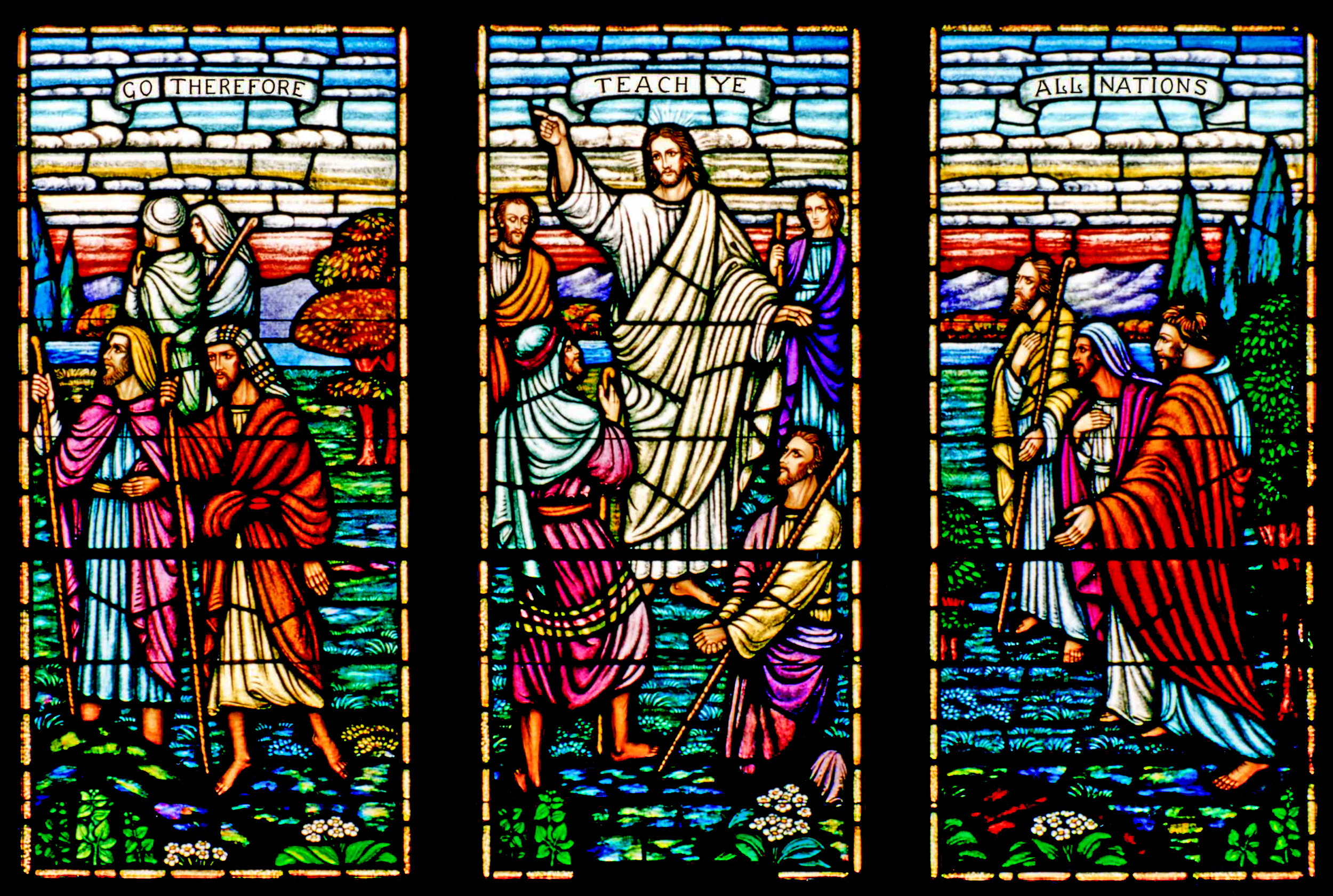
Go Therefore, Teach Ye All Nations - Campbell UCC, Campbell

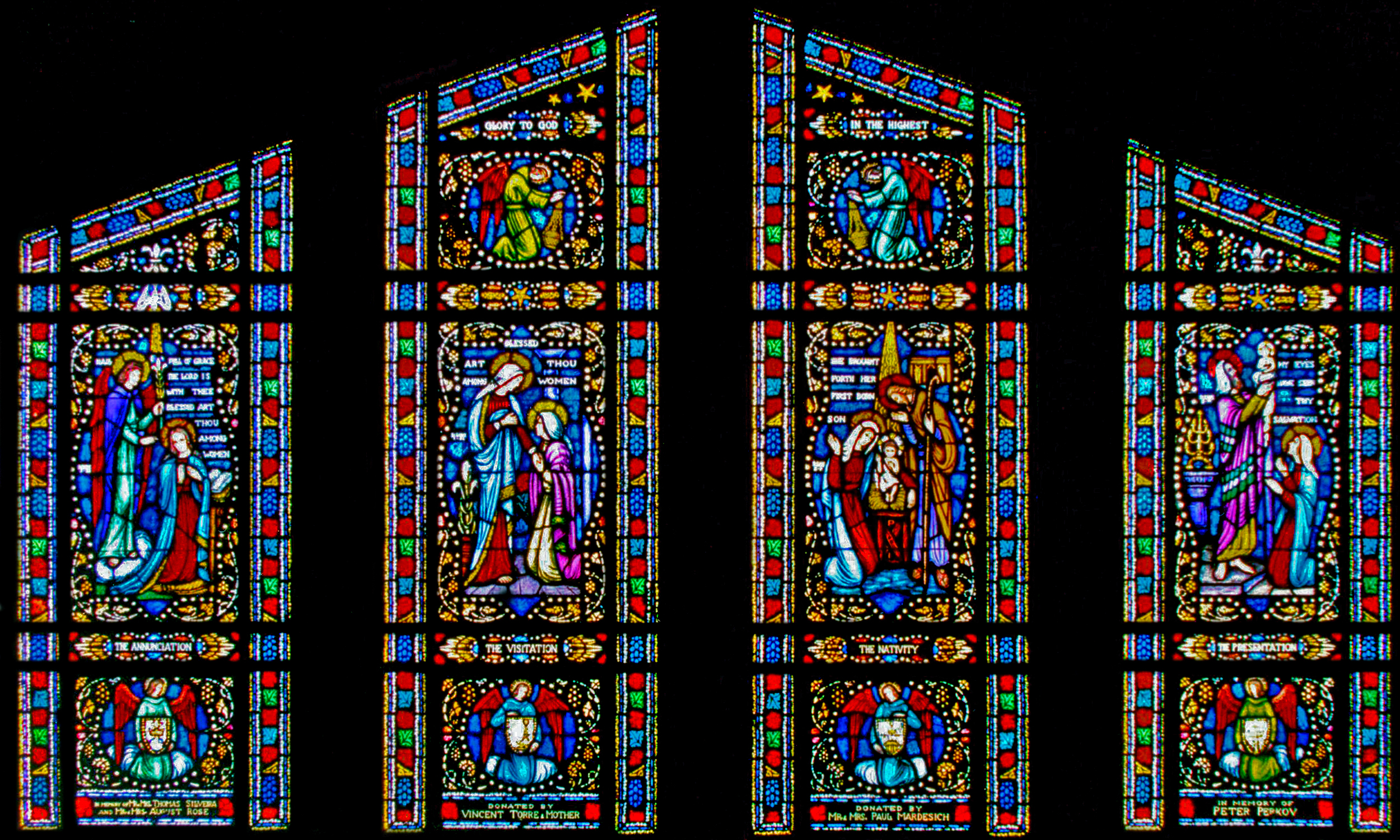
The Joyful Mysteries - St. Joseph of Cupertino Church, Cupertino
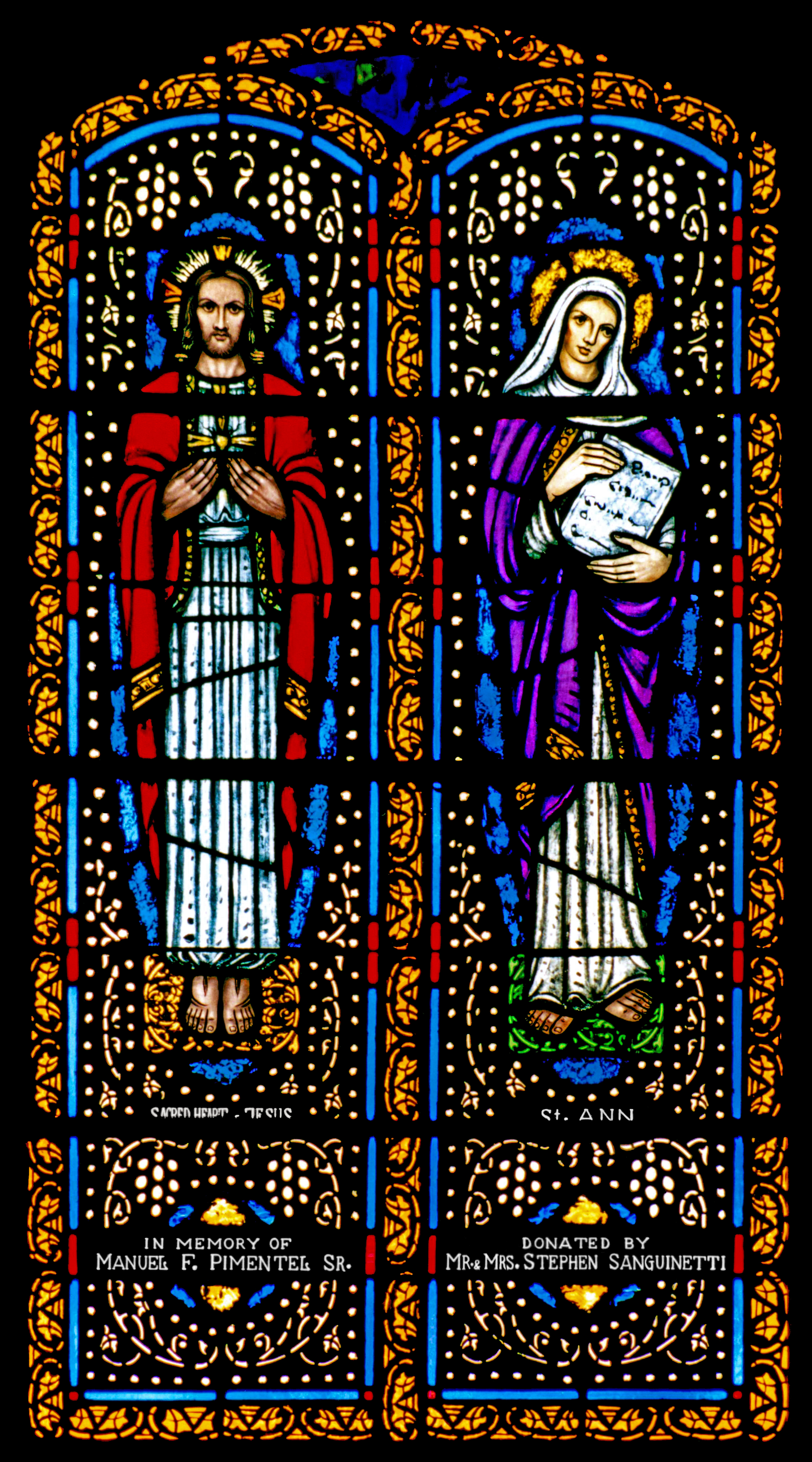
Sacred Heart of Jesus & St. Ann - Holy Cross Church, Linden

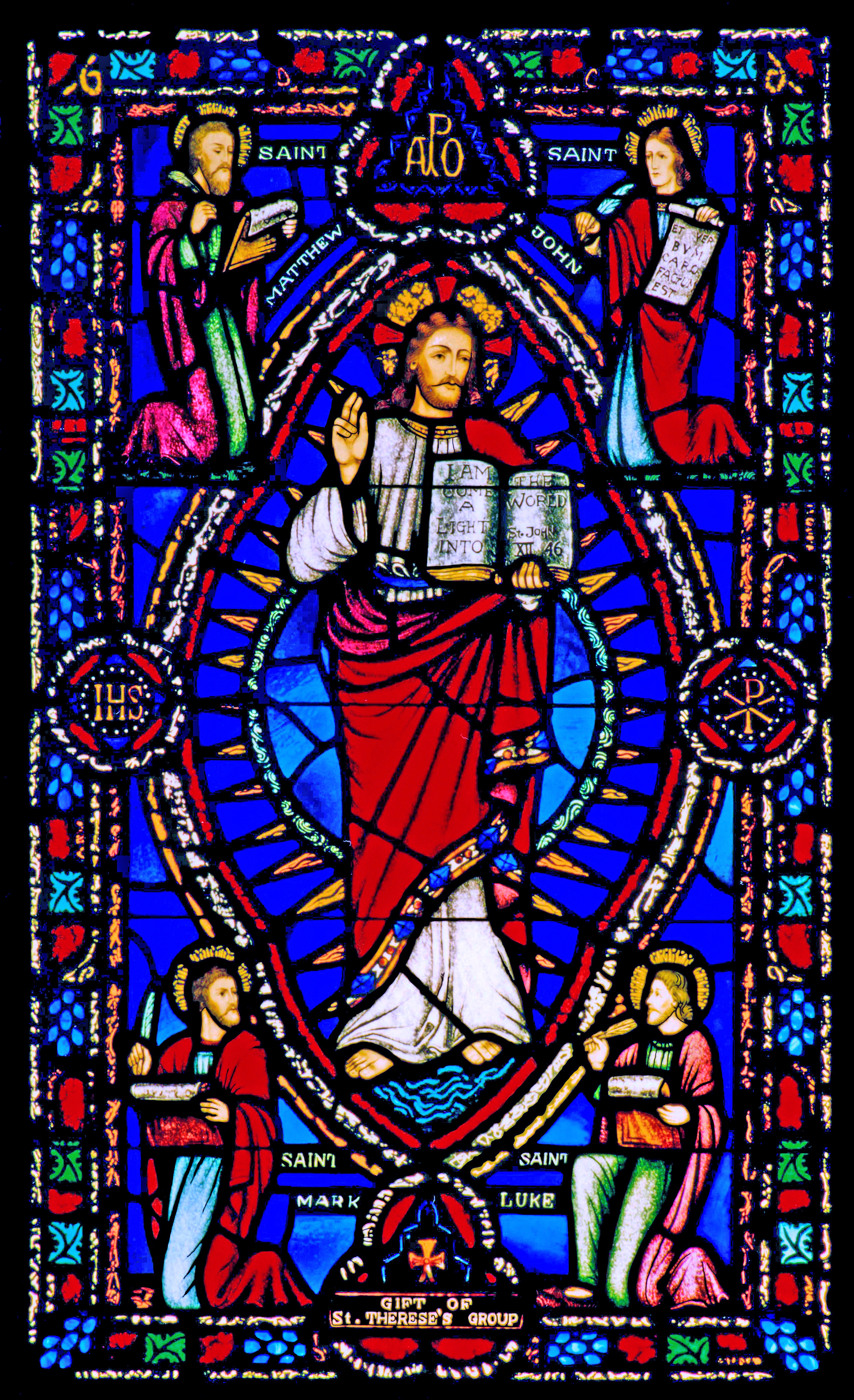
The Evangelists - The Cathedral of the Annunciation, Stockton

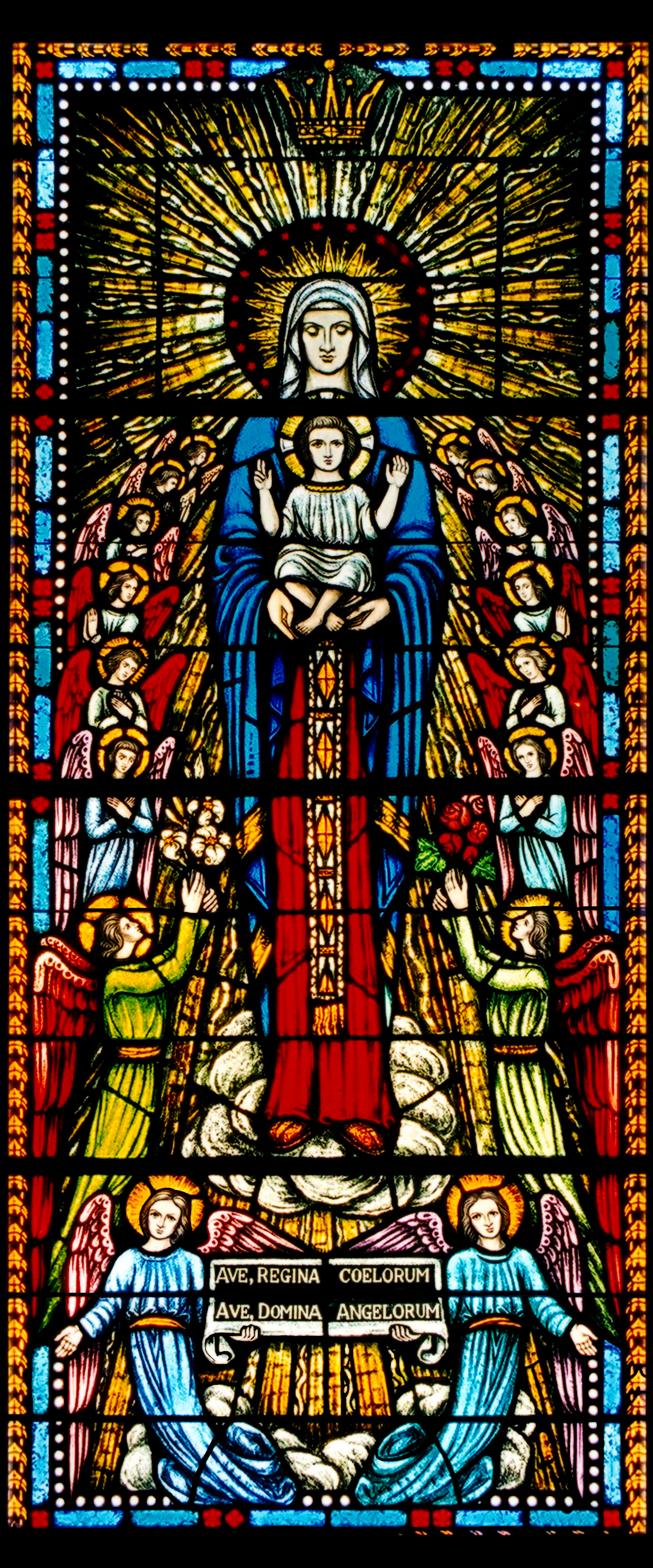
Our Lady of Angels - Our Lady of Angels Church, Burlingame

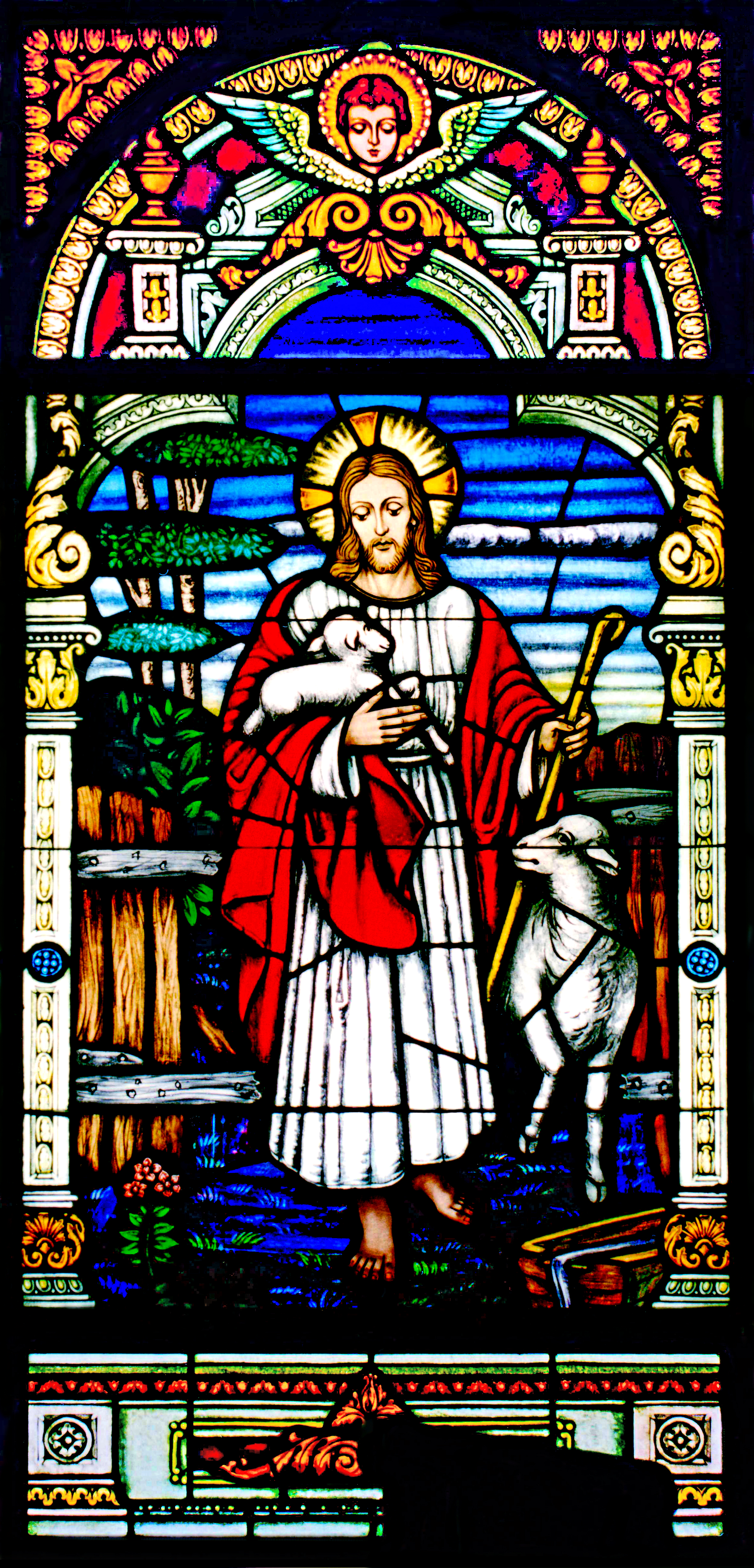
The Good Shepherd - Sisters of the Holy Family Motherhouse, Fremont

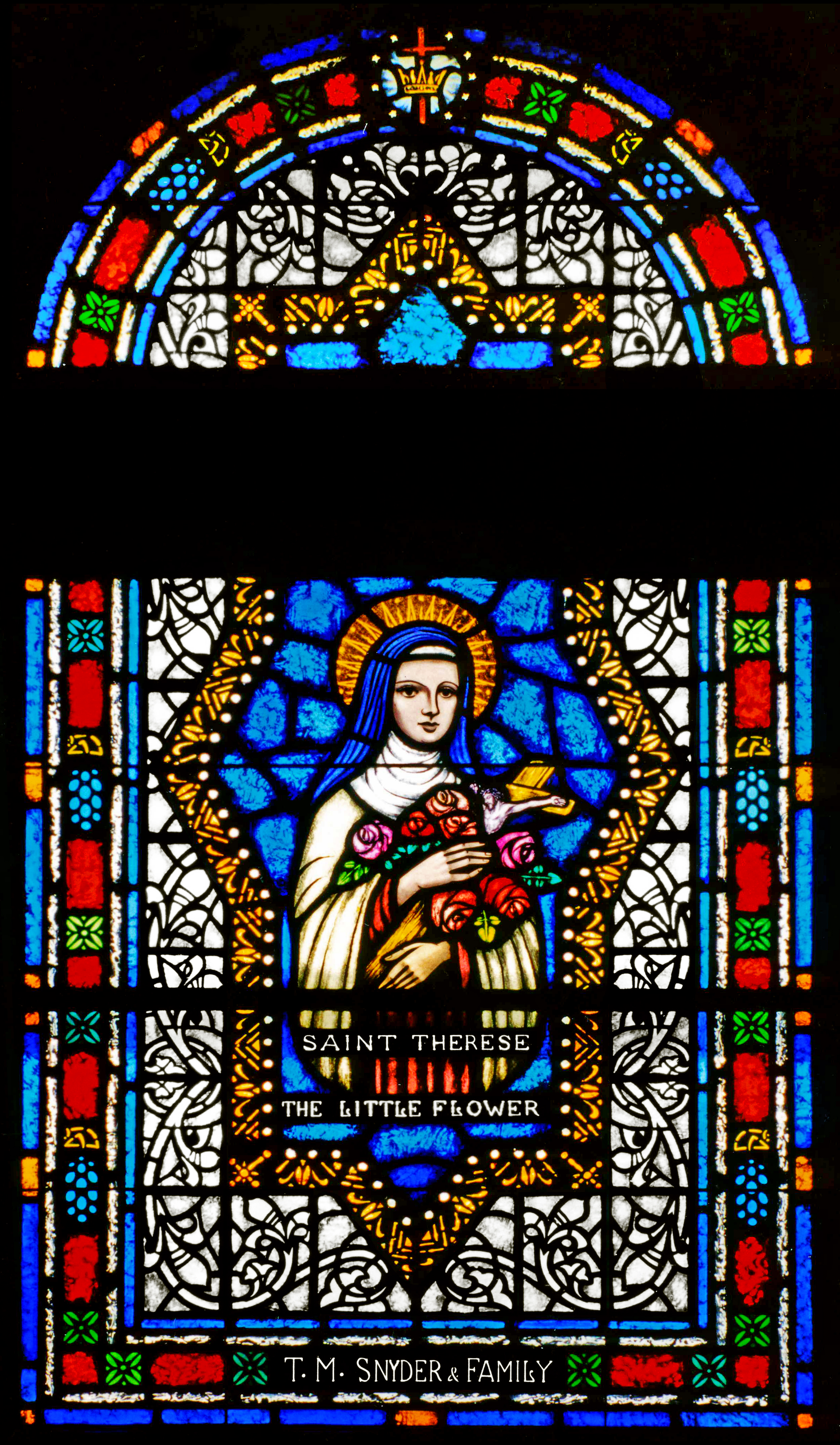
St. Therese, The Little Flower - St. John the Baptist Church, Healdsburg

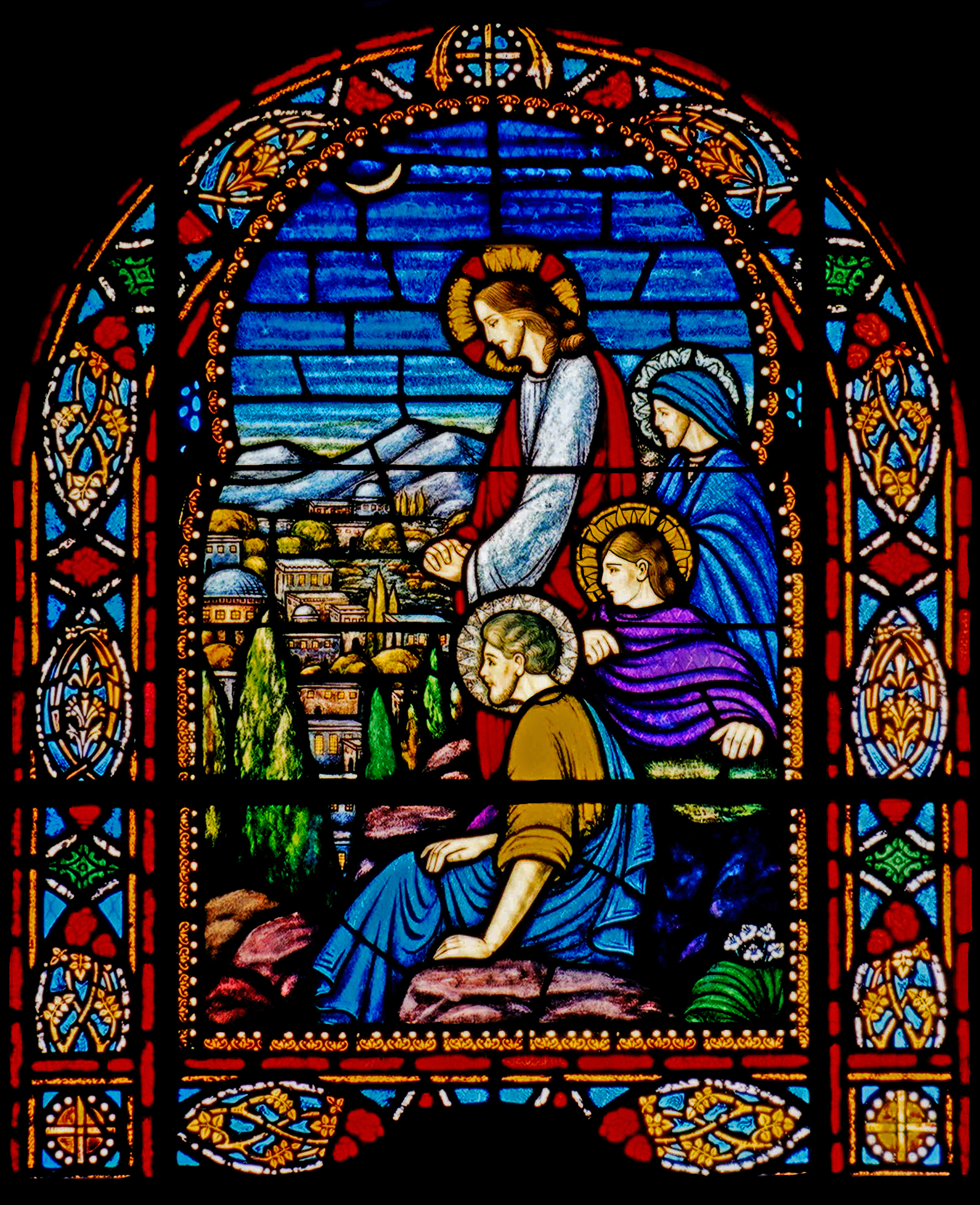
Agony in the Garden - St. Charles Borromeo Church, San Francisco

=== Faceted – Dalle de Verre Glass ===
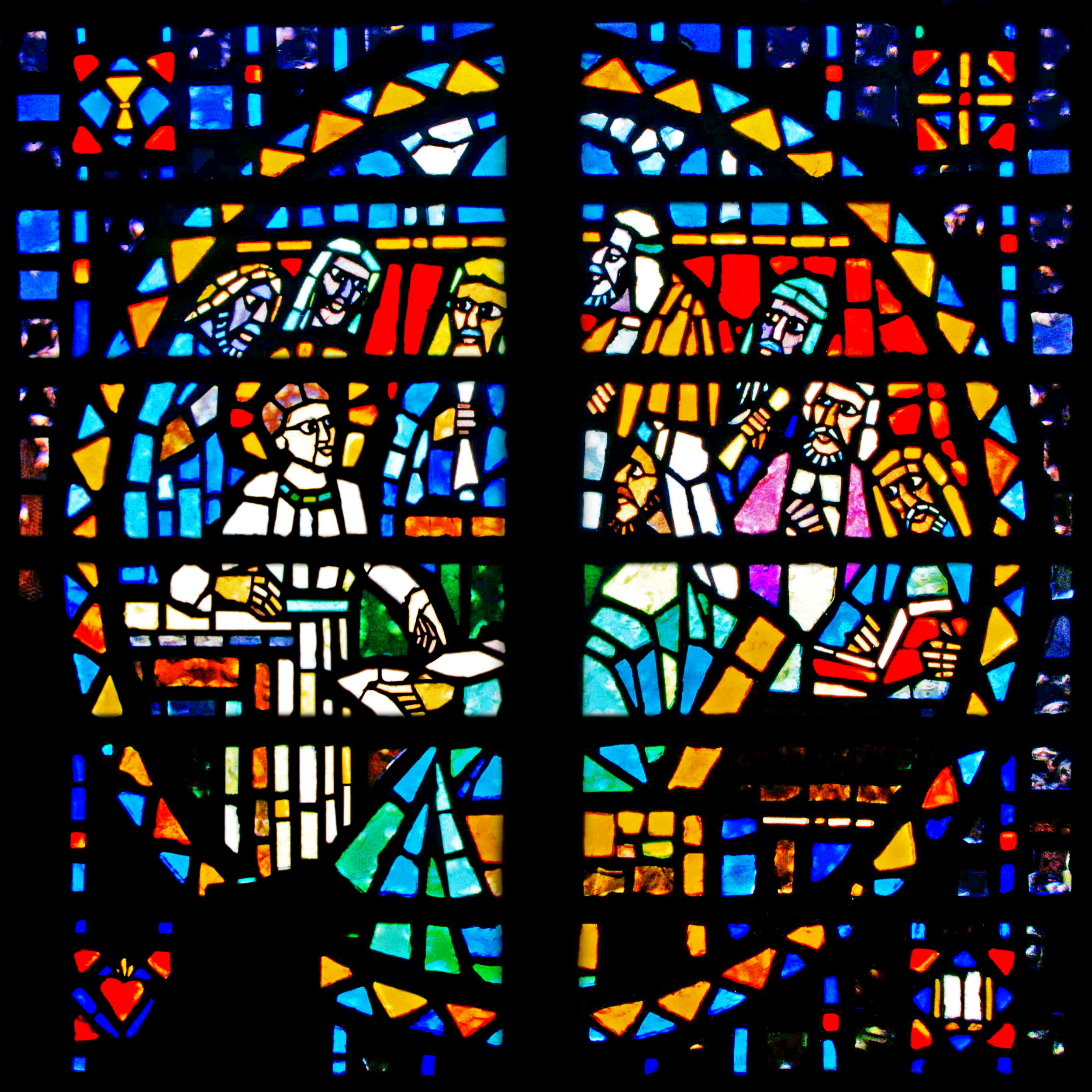
Young Jesus Teaching in the Temple - St. Felicitas Church, San Leandro

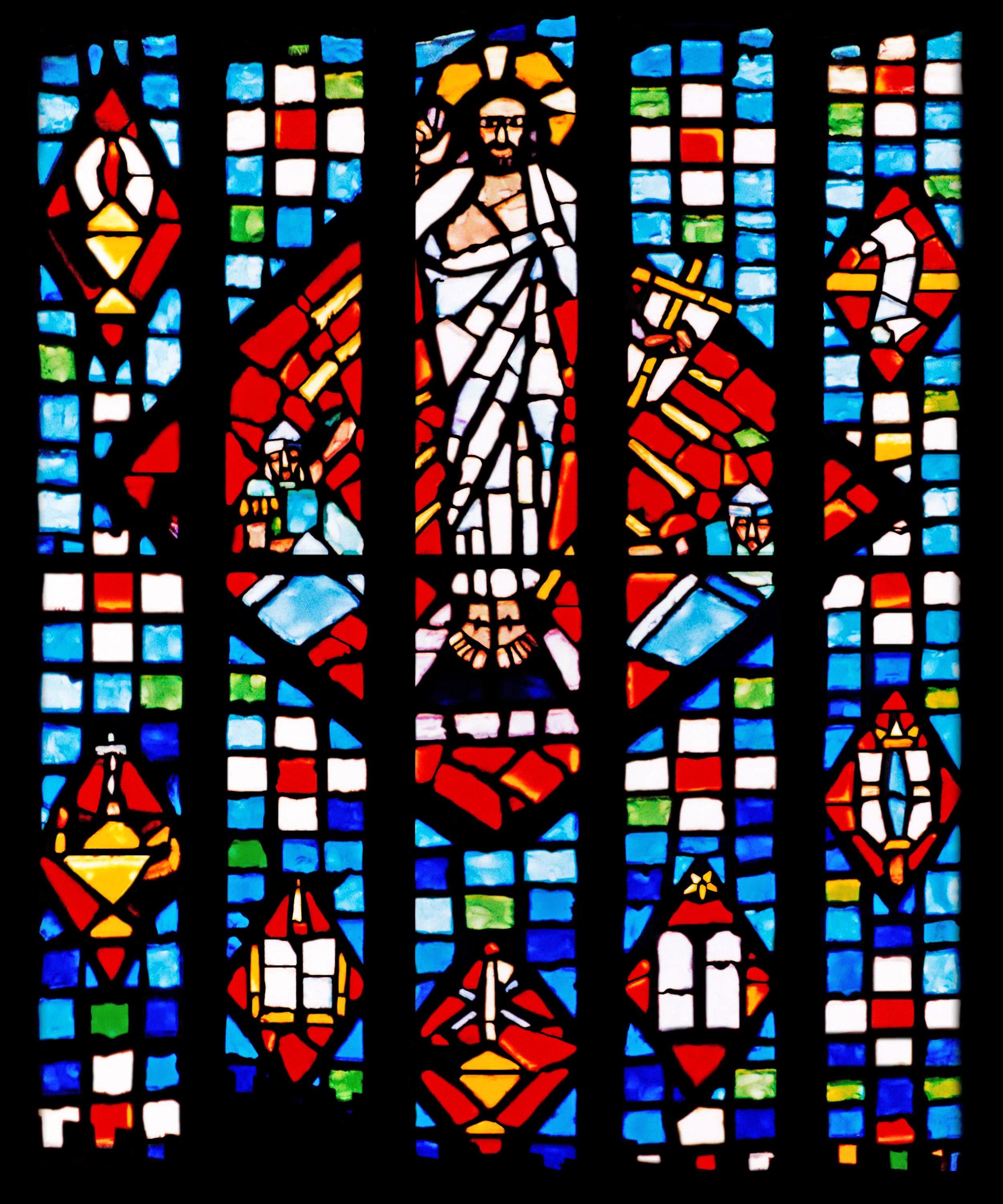
The Resurrection with the Seven Sacraments - St. Felicitas Catholic Church, San Leandro

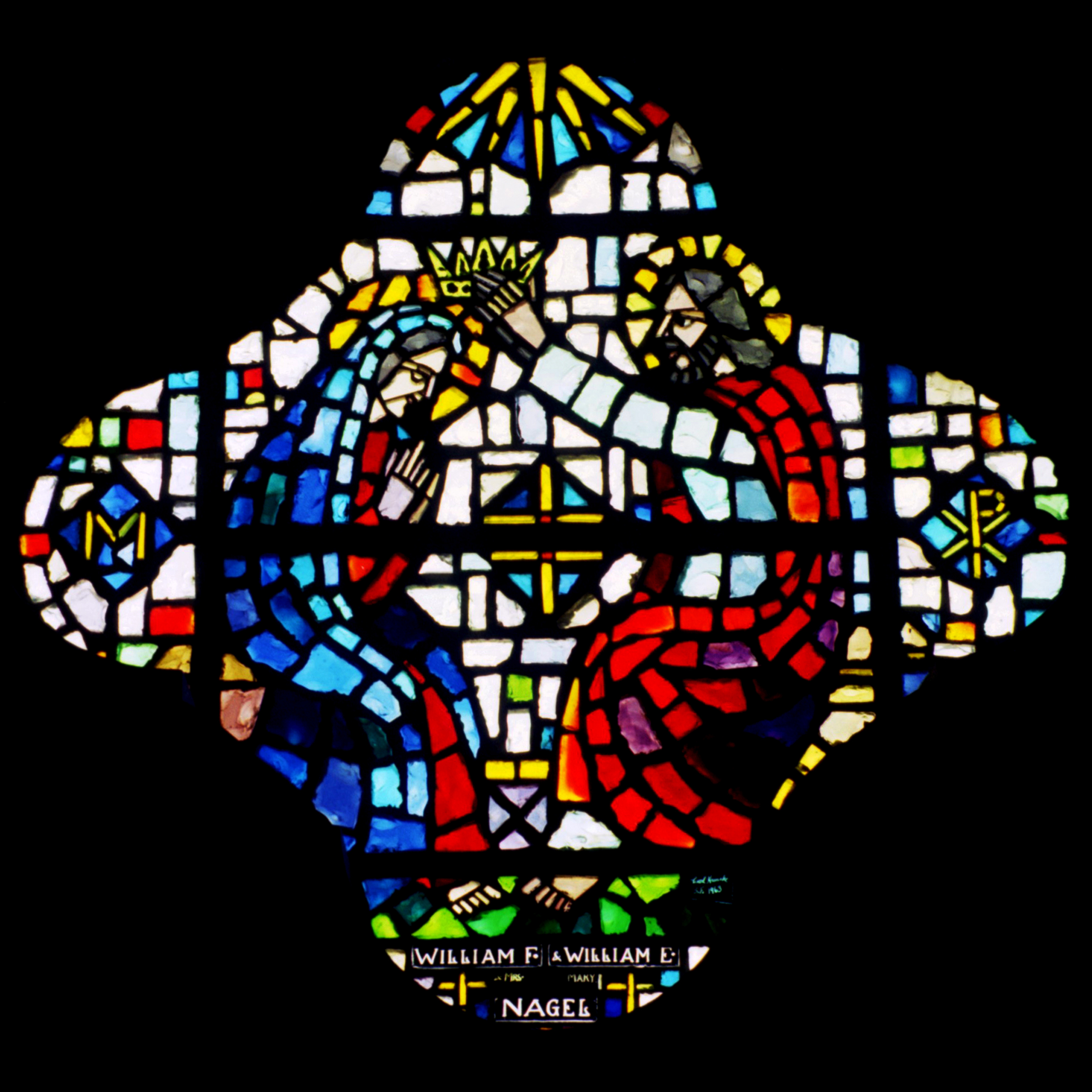
The Coronation of The Blessed Virgin Mary - St. Stephen Church, San Francisco

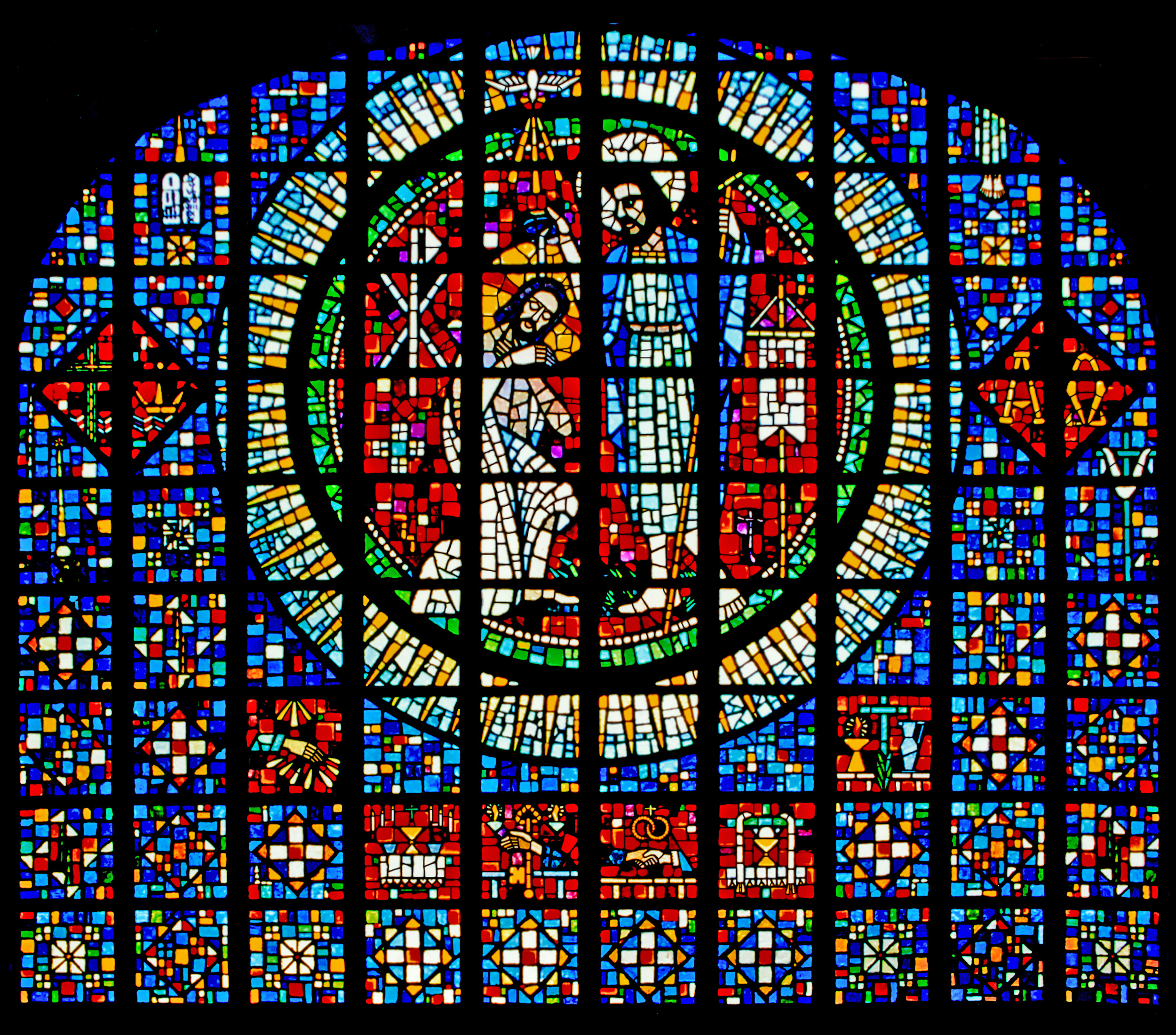
The Baptism of Jesus with the Seven Sacraments - Holy Spirit Church, Fremont

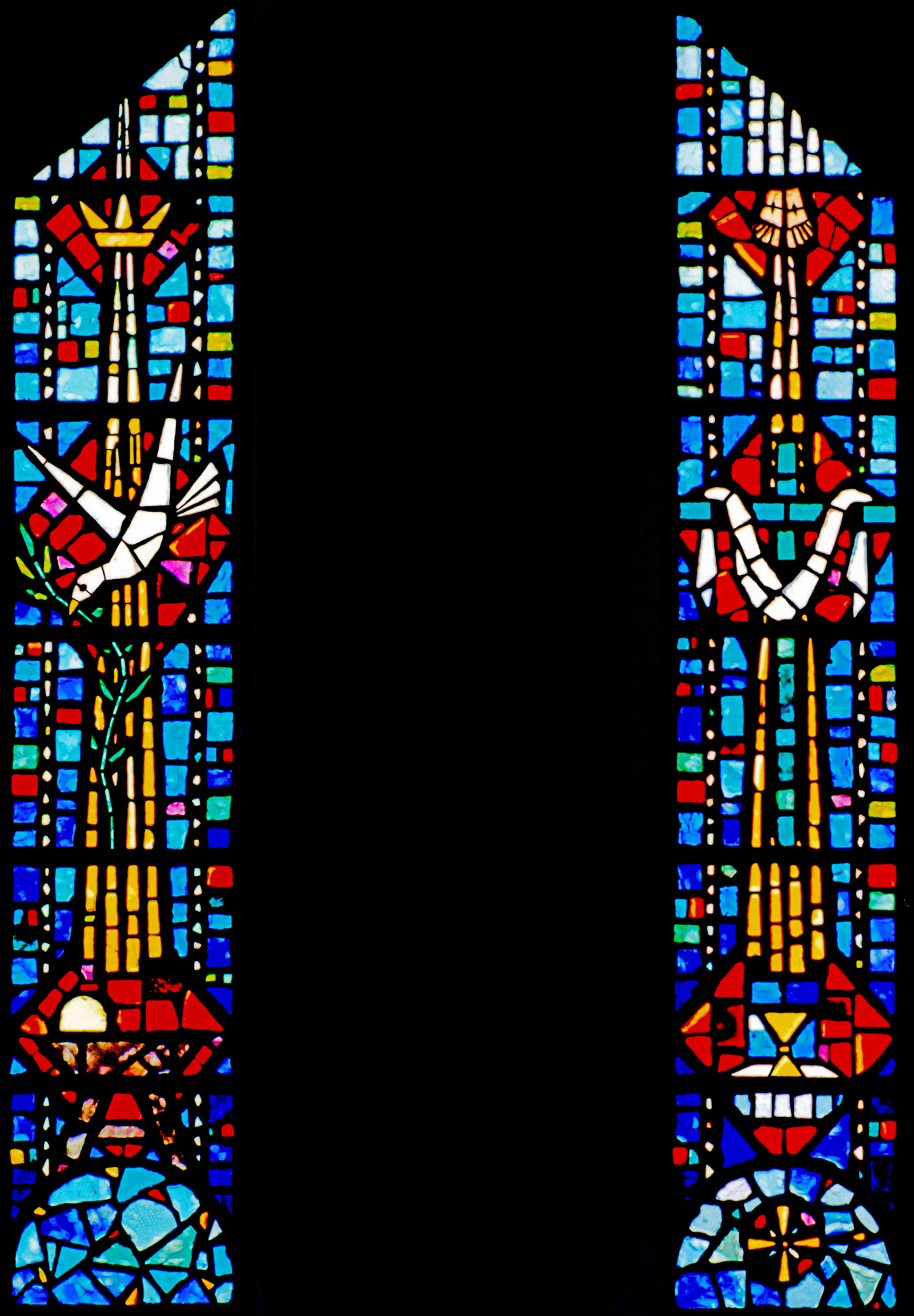
Peace on Earth & Christ's Gift to Mankind - Palm Springs CC, Palm Springs

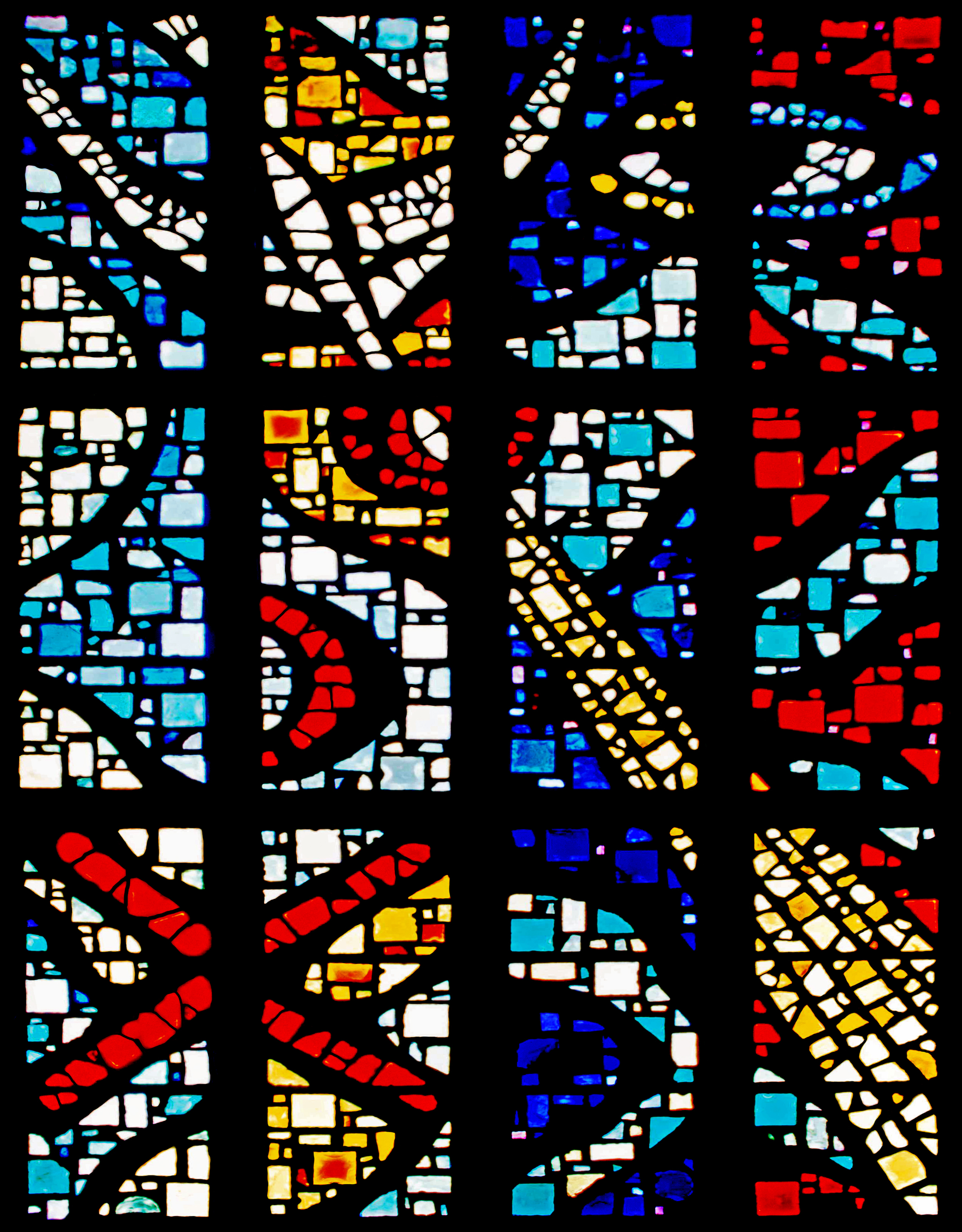
The Holy Spirit - Holy Spirit Church, Fairfield
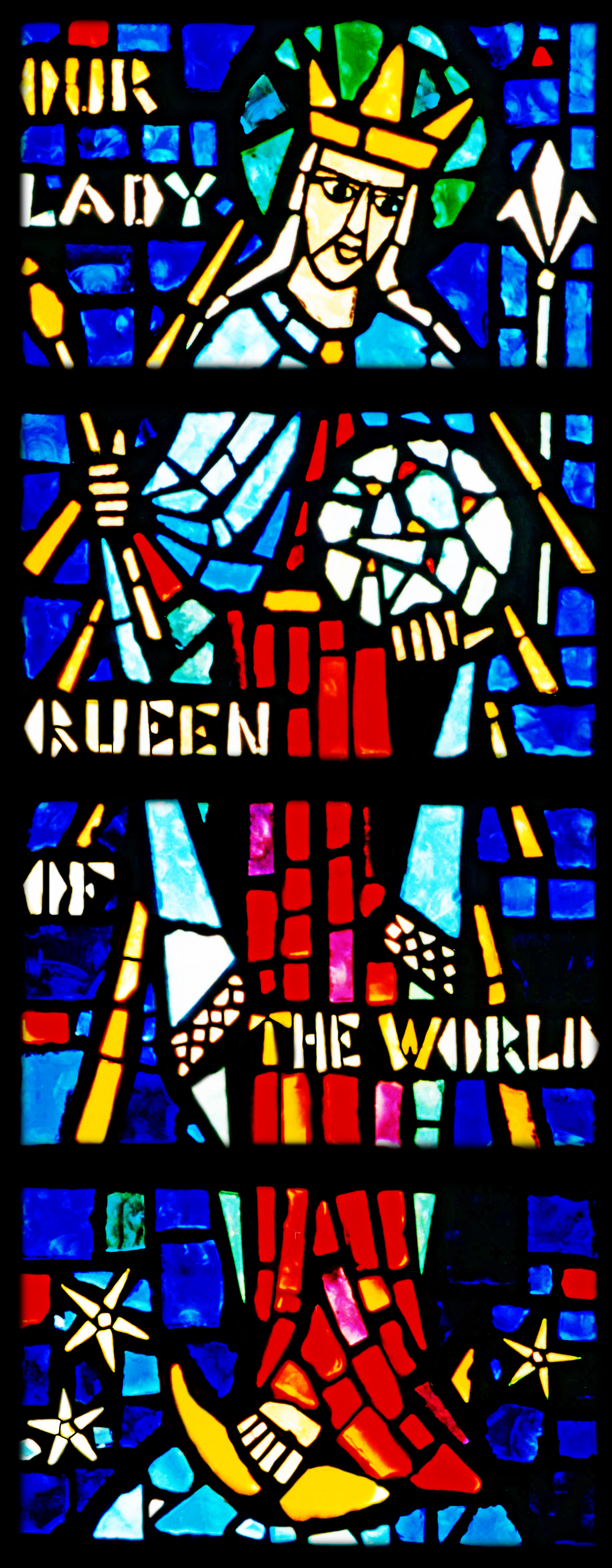
Our Lady Queen of the World - St. Felicitas Church, Fairfield

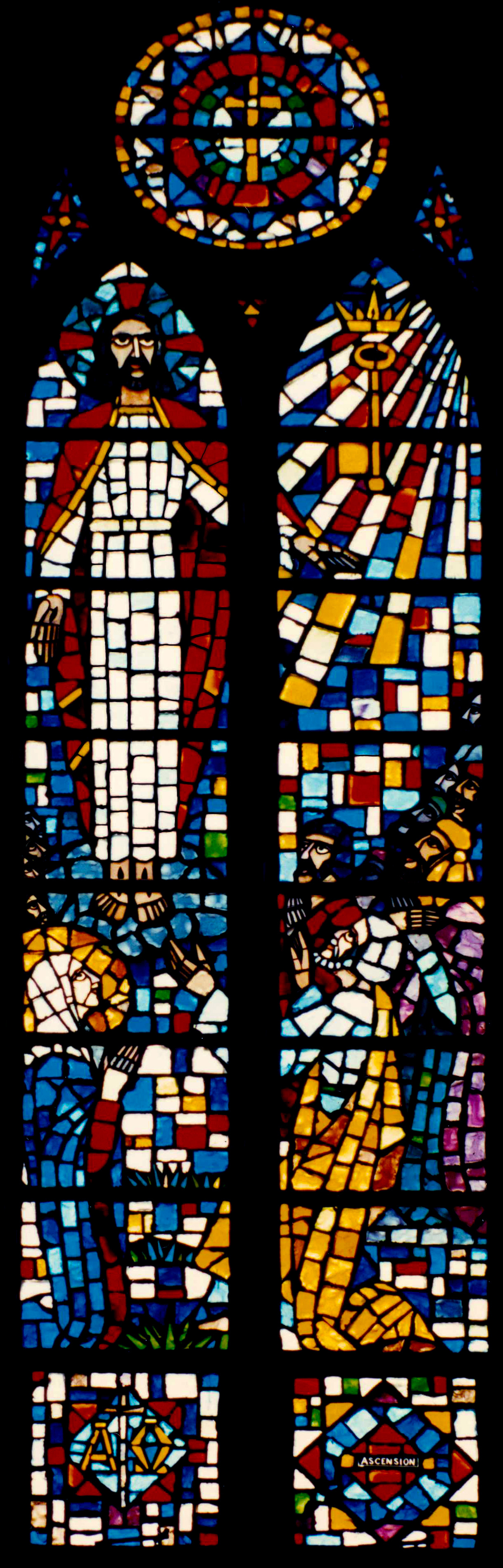
The Ascension - St. Leander Church, San Leandro

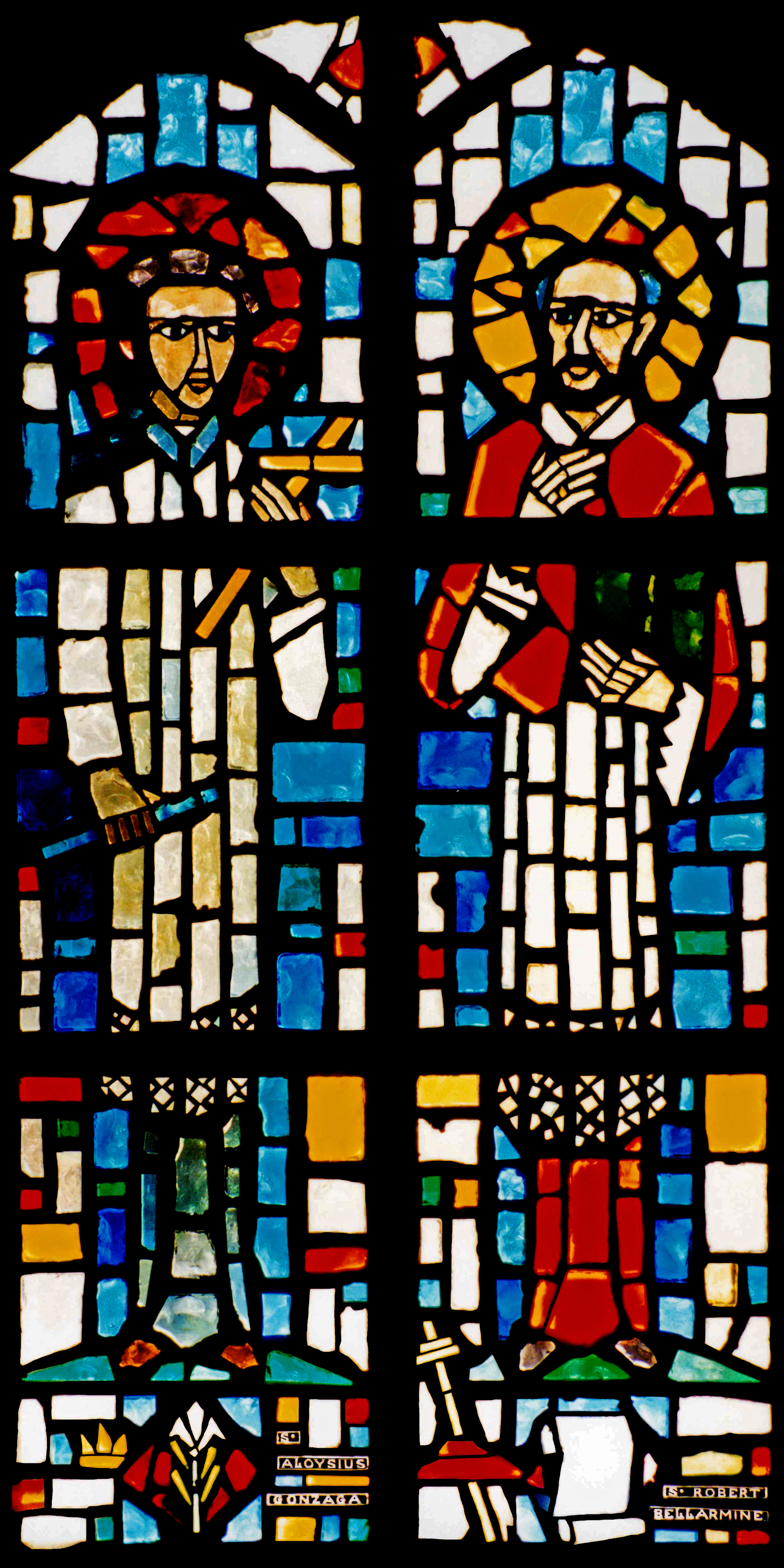
St. Robert & St. Aloysius - St. Ignatius College Preparatory Chapel, San Francisco

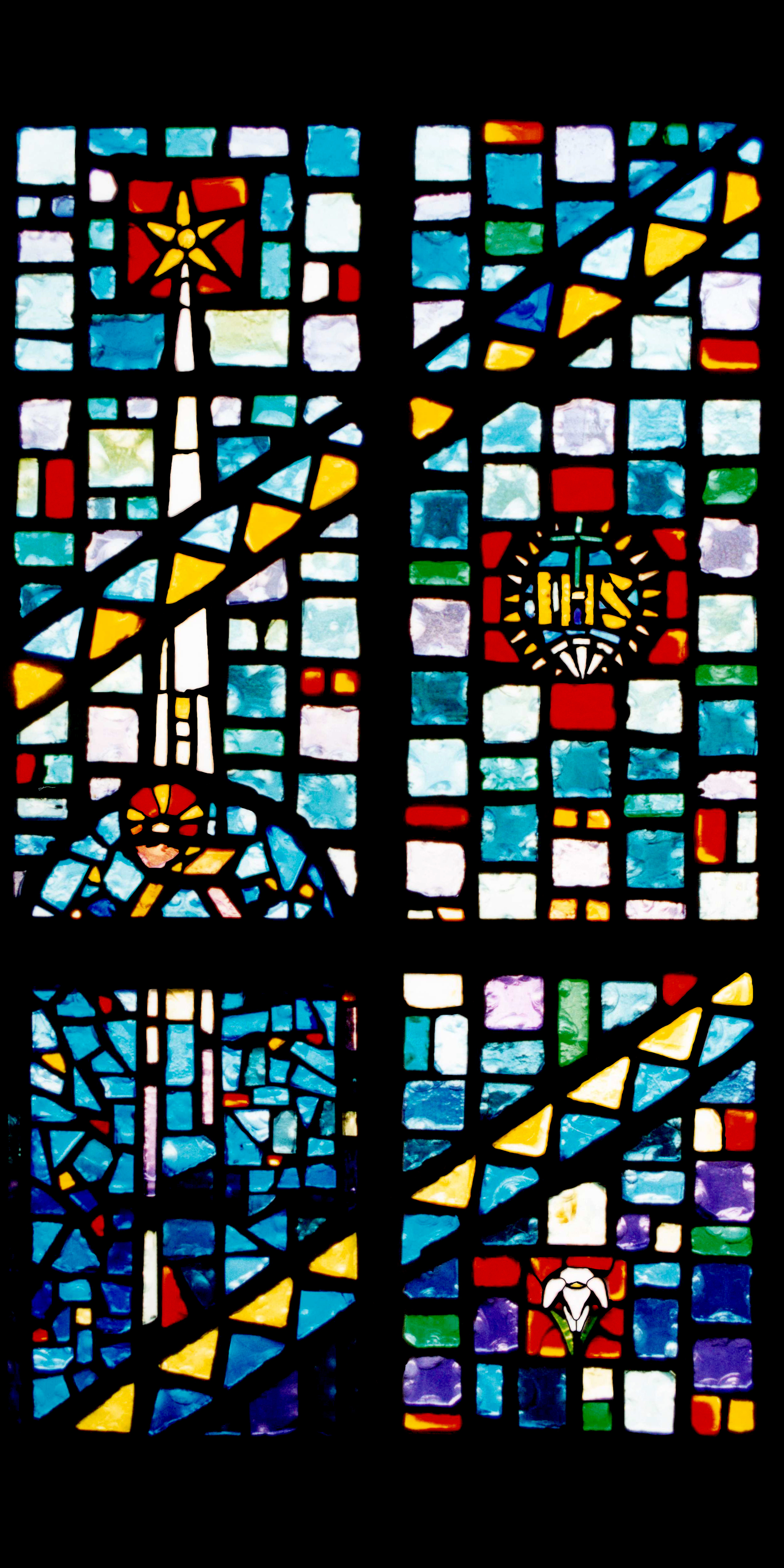
IHS - St. Ignatius College Preparatory Chapel, San Francisco

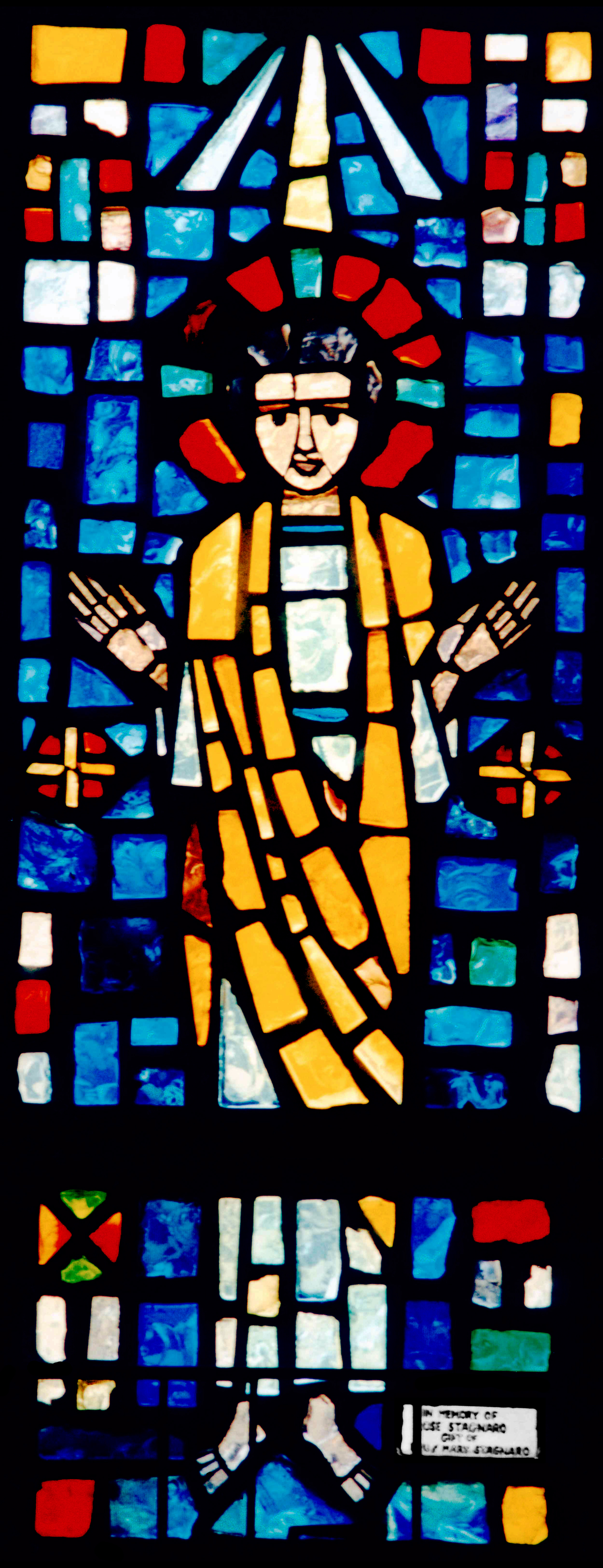
The Holy Family-Young Jesus - Holy Spirit Church, Fairfield

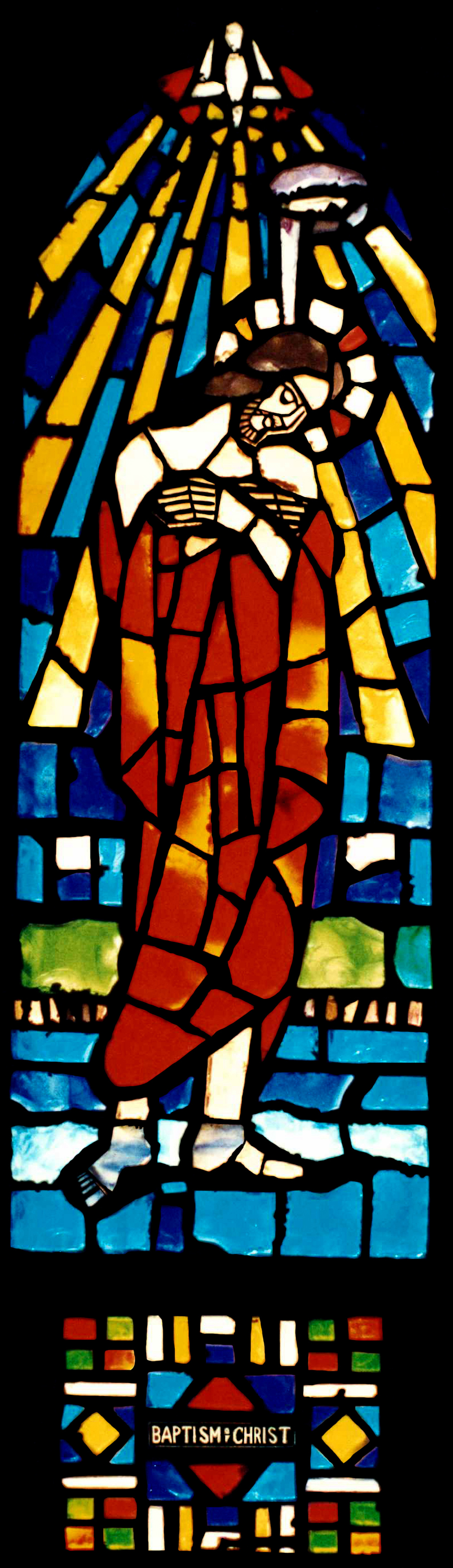
The Baptism of Christ - St. Leander Church, San Leandro

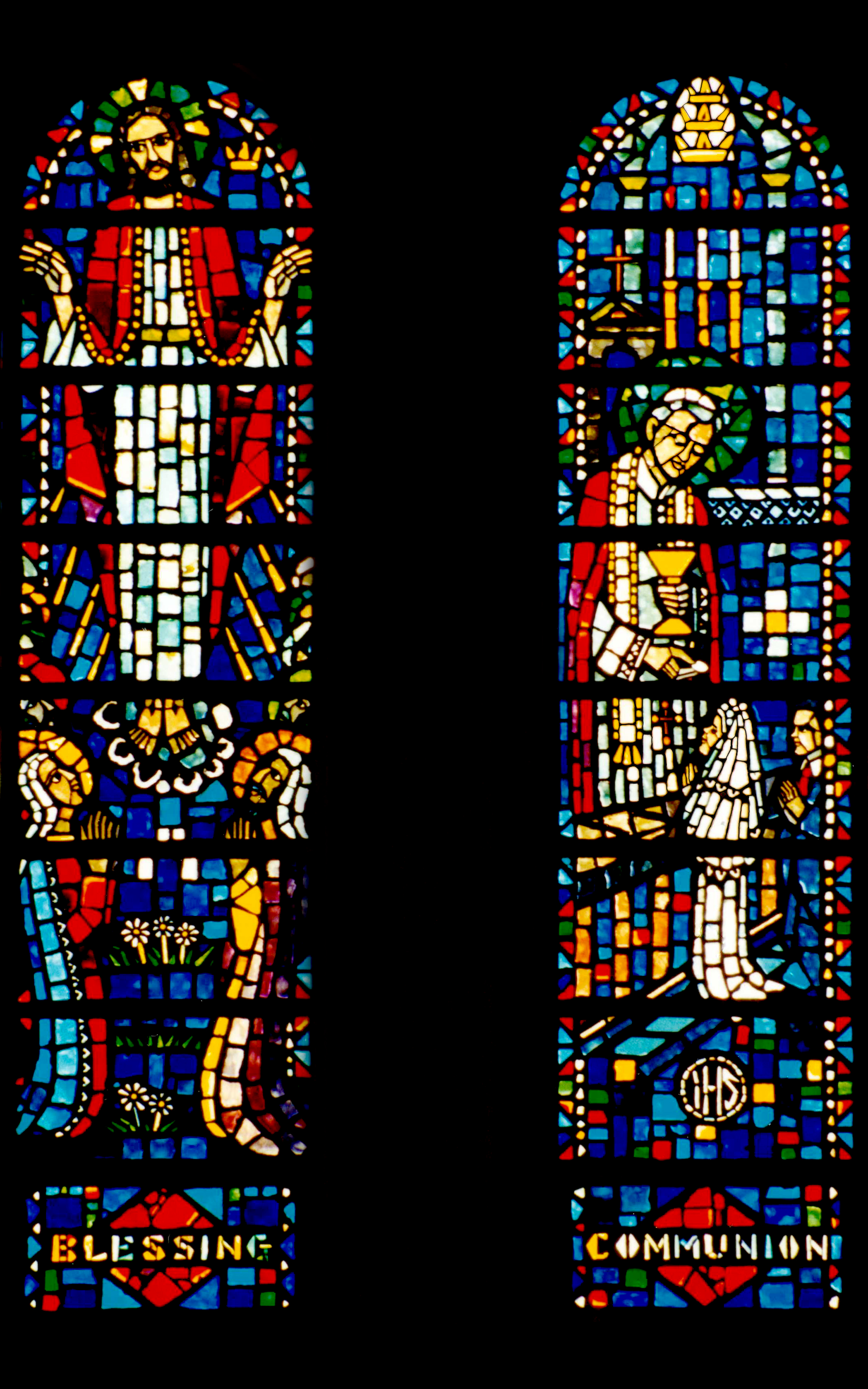
Blessing & Communion - St. Helen's Church, Fresno
