= Rapid prototyping =

Group of techniques to quickly construct physical objects

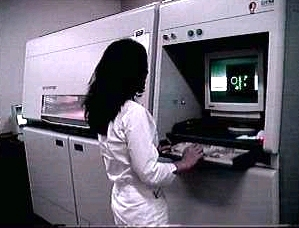
A rapid prototyping machine using selective laser sintering (SLS)

3D model slicing

Rapid prototyping is a group of techniques used to quickly fabricate a novel physical part for use in initial product testing. The model is designed using computer aided design (CAD) software. Construction of the part is usually done using 3D printing technology.

The first methods for rapid prototyping became available in mid 1987 and were used to produce models and prototype parts. Today, they are used for a wide range of applications and are used to manufacture production-quality parts in relatively small numbers if desired without the typical unfavorable short-run economics. This economy has encouraged online service bureaus. Historical surveys of RP technology start with discussions of simulacra production techniques used by 19th-century sculptors. Some modern sculptors use the progeny technology to produce exhibitions and various objects. The ability to reproduce designs from a dataset has given rise to issues of rights, as it is now possible to interpolate volumetric data from 2D images.

As with CNC subtractive methods, the computer-aided-design – computer-aided manufacturing CAD -CAM workflow in the traditional rapid prototyping process starts with the creation of geometric data, either as a 3D solid using a CAD workstation, or 2D slices using a scanning device. For rapid prototyping this data must represent a valid geometric model; namely, one whose boundary surfaces enclose a finite volume, contain no holes exposing the interior, and do not fold back on themselves. In other words, the object must have an "inside". The model is valid if for each point in 3D space the computer can determine uniquely whether that point lies inside, on, or outside the boundary surface of the model. CAD post-processors will approximate the application vendors' internal CAD geometric forms (e.g., B-splines) with a simplified mathematical form, which in turn is expressed in a specified data format which is a common feature in additive manufacturing: STL file format, a de facto standard for transferring solid geometric models to SFF machines.

To obtain the necessary motion control trajectories to drive the actual SFF, rapid prototyping, 3D printing or additive manufacturing mechanism, the prepared geometric model is typically sliced into layers, and the slices are scanned into lines (producing a "2D drawing" used to generate trajectory as in CNC's toolpath), mimicking in reverse the layer-to-layer physical building process.

== Application areas ==
Rapid prototyping is also commonly applied in software engineering to try out new business models and application architectures such as Aerospace, Automotive, Financial Services, Product development, and Healthcare. Aerospace design and industrial teams rely on prototyping in order to create new AM methodologies in the industry. Using SLA they can quickly make multiple versions of their projects in a few days and begin testing quicker. Rapid Prototyping allows designers/developers to provide an accurate idea of how the finished product will turn out before putting too much time and money into the prototype. 3D printing being used for Rapid Prototyping allows for Industrial 3D printing to take place. With this, you could have large-scale moulds to spare parts being pumped out quickly within a short period of time.

== Types of Rapid Prototyping ==
- Stereolithography (SLA) → a laser-cured photopolymer for materials such as thermoplastic-like photopolymers.
- Selective Laser Sintering (SLS) → a laser-sintered powder for materials such as Nylon or TPU.
- Direct Metal Laser Sintering (DMLS) → laser-sintered metal powder for materials like stainless steel, titanium, chrome, and aluminum.
- Fused Deposition Modeling (FDM) → fused extrusions of filaments like ABS, PC, and PPCU.
- Multi Jet Fusion (MJF) → it is an inkjet array selective fusing across bed of nylon powder for Black Nylon 12.
- PolyJet (PJET) → it is a uv-cured jetted photopolymer to work with acrylic-based and elastomeric photopolymers.
- Computer Numerical Controlled Machine (CNC) → it is used for manipulating engineering-grade thermoplastics and metals.
- Injection Molding (IM) → the injection is done using aluminum molds and it is used for thermoplastics, metals and liquid silicone rubber.
- Vacuum Casting→ is a manufacturing process used to create high-quality prototypes and small batches of parts.

== History ==
In the 1970s, Joseph Henry Condon and others at Bell Labs developed the Unix Circuit Design System (UCDS), automating the laborious and error-prone task of manually converting drawings to fabricate circuit boards for the purpose of research and development.

By the 1980s, U.S. policy makers and industrial managers were forced to take note that America's dominance in the field of machine tool manufacturing evaporated, in what was named the machine tool crisis. Numerous projects sought to counter these trends in the traditional CNC CAM area, which had begun in the US. Later when Rapid Prototyping Systems moved out of labs to be commercialized, it was recognized that developments were already international and U.S. rapid prototyping companies would not have the luxury of letting a lead slip away. The National Science Foundation was an umbrella for the National Aeronautics and Space Administration (NASA), the US Department of Energy, the US Department of Commerce NIST, the US Department of Defense, Defense Advanced Research Projects Agency (DARPA), and the Office of Naval Research coordinated studies to inform strategic planners in their deliberations. One such report was the 1997 Rapid Prototyping in Europe and Japan Panel Report in which Joseph J. Beaman founder of DTM Corporation [DTM RapidTool pictured] provides a historical perspective:

The roots of rapid prototyping technology can be traced to practices in topography and photosculpture. Within TOPOGRAPHY Blanther (1892) suggested a layered method for making a mold for raised relief paper topographical maps .The process involved cutting the contour lines on a series of plates which were then stacked. Matsubara (1974) of Mitsubishi proposed a topographical process with a photo-hardening photopolymer resin to form thin layers stacked to make a casting mold. PHOTOSCULPTURE was a 19th-century technique to create exact three-dimensional replicas of objects. Most famously Francois Willeme (1860) placed 24 cameras in a circular array and simultaneously photographed an object. The silhouette of each photograph was then used to carve a replica. Morioka (1935, 1944) developed a hybrid photo sculpture and topographic process using structured light to photographically create contour lines of an object. The lines could then be developed into sheets and cut and stacked, or projected onto stock material for carving. The Munz (1956) Process reproduced a three-dimensional image of an object by selectively exposing, layer by layer, a photo emulsion on a lowering piston. After fixing, a solid transparent cylinder contains an image of the object.

— Joseph J. Beaman

"The Origins of Rapid Prototyping - RP stems from the ever-growing CAD industry, more specifically, the solid modeling side of CAD. Before solid modeling was introduced in the late 1980's, three-dimensional models were created with wire frames and surfaces. But not until the development of true solid modeling could innovative processes such as RP be developed. Charles Hull, who helped found 3D Systems in 1986, developed the first RP process. This process, called stereolithography, builds objects by curing thin consecutive layers of certain ultraviolet light-sensitive liquid resins with a low-power laser. With the introduction of RP, CAD solid models could suddenly come to life".

The technologies referred to as Solid Freeform Fabrication are what we recognize today as rapid prototyping, 3D printing or additive manufacturing: Swainson (1977), Schwerzel (1984) worked on polymerization of a photosensitive polymer at the intersection of two computer controlled laser beams. Ciraud (1972) considered magnetostatic or electrostatic deposition with electron beam, laser or plasma for sintered surface cladding. These were all proposed but it is unknown if working machines were built. Hideo Kodama of Nagoya Municipal Industrial Research Institute was the first to publish an account of a solid model fabricated using a photopolymer rapid prototyping system (1981). The first 3D rapid prototyping system relying on Fused Deposition Modeling (FDM) was made in April 1992 by Stratasys but the patent did not issue until June 9, 1992. Sanders Prototype, Inc introduced the first desktop inkjet 3D Printer (3DP) using an invention from August 4, 1992 (Helinski), Modelmaker 6Pro in late 1993 and then the larger industrial 3D printer, Modelmaker 2, in 1997. Z-Corp using the MIT 3DP powder binding for Direct Shell Casting (DSP) invented 1993 was introduced to the market in 1995. Even at that early date the technology was seen as having a place in manufacturing practice. A low resolution, low strength output had value in design verification, mold making, production jigs and other areas. Outputs have steadily advanced toward higher specification uses. Sanders Prototype, Inc. (Solidscape) started as a Rapid Prototyping 3D Printing manufacturer with the Modelmaker 6Pro for making sacrificial Thermoplastic patterns of CAD models using Drop-On-Demand (DOD) inkjet single nozzle technology.

Research in rapid prototyping (RP) focuses on increasing production speeds and adapting the technology for mass-manufacturing applications. As with computer numerical control (CNC) technologies, the development of open-source software has created an end-to-end CAD-CAM toolchain. This has supported a community of manufacturers producing low-resolution devices. Hobbyist use has also expanded to include more complex laser-based designs.

The earliest list of RP Processes or Fabrication Technologies published in 1993 was written by Marshall Burns and explains each process very thoroughly. It also names some technologies that were precursors to the names on the list below. For Example: Visual Impact Corporation only produced a prototype printer for wax deposition and then licensed the patent to Sanders Prototype, Inc instead. BPM used the same inkjets and materials.

== Advantages of Rapid Prototyping ==
It accelerates the design process of any product as it allows for both low fidelity prototyping and high fidelity prototyping, to foresee the necessary adjustments to be made before the final production line. As a result of this, it also cuts production costs for the overall product development and allows functionality testing at a fraction of the regular cost. It eliminates the risk of the design team suffering injuries and the prototype from getting damaged during the modeling process. It also allows users or focus groups to have an involvement in the design process through interactions with each of the prototypes, from the initial prototype to the final model. For example: rapid tooling manufacturing process based on CNC machining prototypes, making the mold manufacturing cost reduction, shorten the mold manufacturing cycle, with easier to promote the application of the realization of the mold making process flow and other advantages. Furthermore, it is an ideal way to test for ergonomics and anthropometry (human factors) so that the designed product is capable of fulfilling the user's needs and offers a unique experience of usage.

== Disadvantages of Rapid Prototyping ==
Although there are various benefits that come with rapid prototyping, some of the negative aspects of it are that there can a be a lack of accuracy as it cannot guarantee that the quality of the prototype will be high or that the different components will fit well together due to a range of error in the dimensions of the 3D model. Also, the initial cost of using this production technique can be expensive due to the technology, which it works with. It can limit the range of materials, which the product can be made with and depending on the level of complexity that the design entails, it can lead to hard skill labor.

== See also ==
- Digital modeling and fabrication
- Fab lab
- Laser engineered net shaping
- Minimum viable product
- Open hardware
- Rapid tooling
- Transportable Applications Environment
- Von Neumann universal constructor

== Bibliography ==
- Wright, Paul Kenneth (2001). 21st Century Manufacturing. New Jersey: Prentice Hall. ISBN 978-0130956019. OCLC 43836655 – via Archive.org.
