= Jan Szczepanik =

Polish inventor (1872–1926

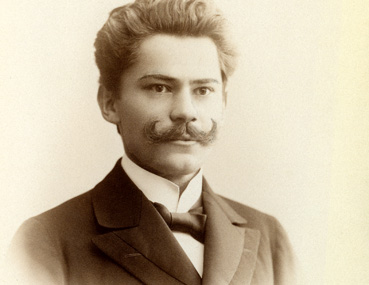
- Born: June 13, 1872; Rudniki, Austrian Poland
- Died: April 18, 1926 (aged 53); Tarnów, Poland
- Occupation: Inventor

Jan Szczepanik (June 13, 1872 – April 18, 1926) was a Polish inventor, with several hundred patents and over 50 discoveries to his name, many of which are still applied today, especially in the motion picture industry, as well as in photography and television. Some of his concepts developed the future evolution of TV broadcasting, such as the telectroscope (an apparatus for distant reproduction of images and sound using electricity) or the wireless telegraph, which greatly affected the development of telecommunications. He died in Tarnów in the Second Polish Republic.

== Biography ==
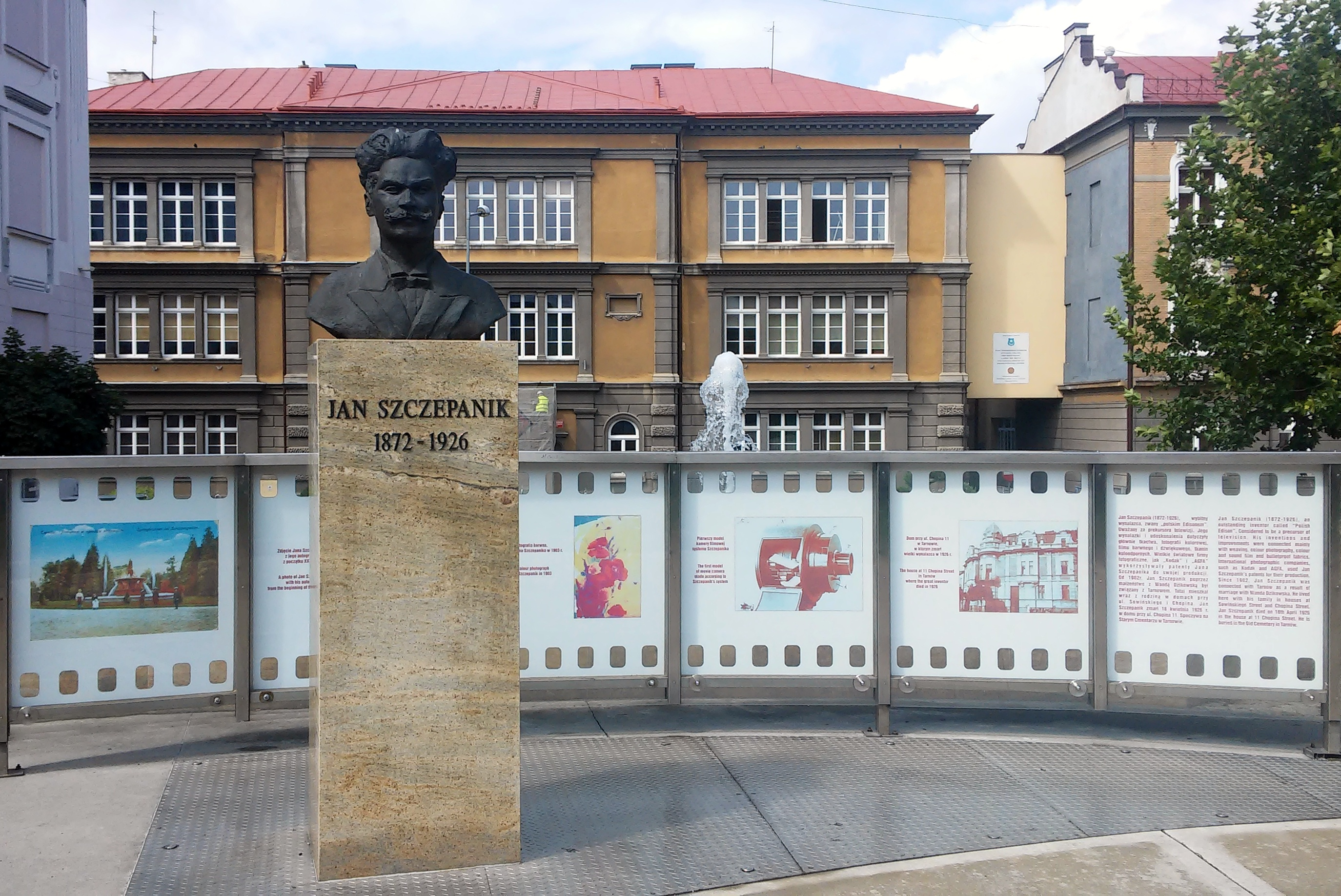
Jan Szczepanik memorial in Tarnów, Poland

Szczepanik was born in the Austrian Partition, in the village of Rudniki near Mościska (now Mostyska, Ukraine) but relocated as infant with his mother to Zręcin in the industrial region of Krosno, where he grew up. His birthplace was controlled by Austria-Hungary between 1772–1918 after the partitions of Poland. Szczepanik graduated from a teachers' college and spent a lot of time reading scientific literature and journals. He moved to Vienna after his attempt to advance the Jacquard loom from France (invented in 1801) was rejected by some local weavers for fear of losing business. His knowledge of fabric however, enabled him to create the first ballistic vest using silk. Spanish king Alfonso XIII (who used it in 1901) awarded him an order for its invention. Szczepanik was granted awards by other royal courts. The Emperor Franz Joseph of Austria relieved him of mandatory military service fascinated with photosculpture – known also as photoplastigraphy – introduced to him by Szczepanik. It was based on an idea patented in 1859 by François Willème (1830–1905) for producing portrait sculpture using synchronized photo projections. The Emperor gave him a pair of pistols for that as a souvenir.

Before World War I, Szczepanik carried out experiments with photography and image projection, as well as with small format color film. He holds patents for a new weaving method, a system of obtaining tri-color photography rasters, and equipment for sound recording and playback.

Following the discoverer's idea, Agfa corporation produced its Agfacolor reversible paper; color films were also made for the first time, projecting 24 frames per second. Szczepanik's more significant discoveries also include the colorimeter (a color control tool), an electric rifle, and a color image weaving method, together with the automation of their production.

Szczepanik also worked on a moving wing aircraft, a duplex rotor helicopter, a dirigible, and a submarine. Mark Twain met Szczepanik and described him in two of his articles: "The Austrian Edison keeping school again" (1898) and "From The Times of 1904" (1898).

== See also ==
- List of Poles
- Timeline of Polish science and technology
