= Vacuum casting =

Vacuum casting may refer to:

- Casting (filling), the general casting concept of using a vacuum to fill a mold cavity
- Vacuum casting (elastomers), the casting technique for elastomers
- Vacuum molding (casting), a type of sand casting
