= Transportable Applications Environment =

1980s GUI development environment

The Transportable Applications Environment (TAE) was a rapid prototyping graphical user interface development environment created by NASA in the 1980s. It is available for us on DEC VAX ULTRIX, DEC RISC ULTRIX, Sun, VAX/VMS, Silicon Graphics, HP9000, and IBM RS/6000 based systems.
