= TASK party =

The TASK parties are a series of improvisational events in cities throughout the world organized by New York-based artist Oliver Herring.

Herring held the first event in London in 2002. Subsequent events have been held among other places in Washington, DC Toronto, Seattle Philadelphia, and San Francisco, California, often partnering with local art museums.

In a typical TASK party, a limited number of invited participants each perform tasks as they interpret, as written on slips of paper drawn at random. Once finished, they write a new task for others, and draw a new one for themselves. The events are held in public spaces such as university student commons, or in other large areas (outdoors, museums), where the public at large can easily interact as they enter the space.
