= Rapid tooling =

Rapid tooling (RT) in the plastic injection molding industry refers to molds that are manufactured in a very short period of time, also known as prototype tooling.

== Uses ==
Some of the main advantages to rapid tooling trades is that it decreases the time and cost of the product. With rapid tools being fast and easily reproducible, it requires less stock for finished tools. These tools will be produced on demand and are available almost immediately. Special tools or tools where no supplier is existing on the market any more can be reproduced without bigger design and production efforts. However, the disadvantages are that it is not as accurate and also shortens the lifespan of the product.

Rapid tooling is mainly used for specific needs including prototyping and troubleshooting existing problems. Rapid prototyping is not often used for large scale and long term operations for a part. Nevertheless, rapid tooling is starting to be used to create molds for commercial operations because the time lag is so short between start to finish and since a CAD file is the only thing needed for the design stage. Since alternate methods require precious time and resources, rapid tooling provides a way to quickly provide molds for the required products. This allows companies to quickly make commercial products with the advances of rapid prototyping.

In addition, rapid tooling provides the customization necessary for personal applications. Instead of tedious trial and error measurements, rapid prototyping processes allow scientists and doctors the ability to scan and digitize the item or patient. Then by putting it through a CAD program, a personal custom mold can be created to fix the problem. An example of this procedure is for dental patients. Originally to fabricate an oral application, an alginate impression or a wax registration is used to fit the teeth with the mold. With new advances, doctors can take a scan of the dental arches to correctly and quickly make a mold out of silicone for the patient. This allows for better accuracy and more acute customization of the mold in the future.

== Production tooling ==
Unlike rapid tooling, production tooling (PT) refers to molds that are manufactured according to a normal process in a normal production time. Some of the main advantages of production tooling are that it has a longer Life Cycle and is suitable for mass production.
