= Oliver Herring =

German sculptor

- Born: 1964 (age 61–62); Heidelberg, Germany
- Education: The Ruskin School of Drawing and Fine Art; Hunter College

Oliver Herring (born 1964 in Heidelberg, Germany) is an experimental artist based in Brooklyn, New York. His works include knitting Mylar, participatory performances, styrofoam photo sculptures and video.

== Biography ==
Herring as born in Heidelberg Germany in 1964. He earned his BFA at The Ruskin School of Drawing and Fine Art, University of Oxford. He went on to Hunter College in New York where he got his MFA.

== Work ==
Oliver Herring started his art career as a painter with very colorful and expressive works. When Ethyl Eichelberger committed suicide in 1991, Herring started knitting Mylar to pay respect to him. Herring knit the transparent tape into colorless human figures, clothing and furniture. When they were on display, he chose the Mylar clothing to be hung or placed in a way that it looks like the shape they would be if worn.

=== Performance video art ===
Herring moved from knitting Mylar to video and participatory performances in 1998. His videos were primarily stop motion. When he was sitting in his knitting chair for hours on end, knitting, his mind would wonder and his stop motion videos expressed his thoughts. In his video Exit, he starts out in his knitting chair, than through stop motion he bounds out of it in a flight of fancy. He flies from his chair into the air in a jerky movement. The next scene he has long white hair, still flying through the air.

In the participatory performances he replaces himself with his friends and strangers to star in the videos. He incorporates stop motion video in these as well. Herring cared more about the process then he did about the medium which is why his video was not high quality and his stop motion was jerky.

Herring does not like the term act or actor because he believes the people end up contributing to his art and it becomes a collaboration. Herring said “I don’t think of the people I work with as models or actors. They are people who are willing to sacrifice their time for me.” [PBS]

One of his most famous experiments is Spitting Food Dye, similar to Spit Reverse. These experiments consists of strangers he found who would dress in a white shirt, black pants and spit food dye out of their mouths into the air and back on their faces. After hours of this, they were tired with dye all over their faces, he would photograph them. He would repeat this with different people. The photographs would be placed on display, where people are able to compare them next to each other.

=== Photo sculpture ===
For the Styrofoam Photo sculpture, Herring starts with a polystyrene base and pastes thousands of cut up photographs to the base. “Gloria”, one of his most famous sculptures, is of a girl leaning against a wall in a colorful flower dress holding her necklace. Herring took pictures from every angle of her and he cut and pasted them on the base to form the sculpture.

=== TASK parties ===
Beginning in 2002 Herring organized a series of participatory improvisational art events known as TASK parties. To find an interview with Herring discussing his personal thoughts on TASK.
