= Plano-convex ingot =

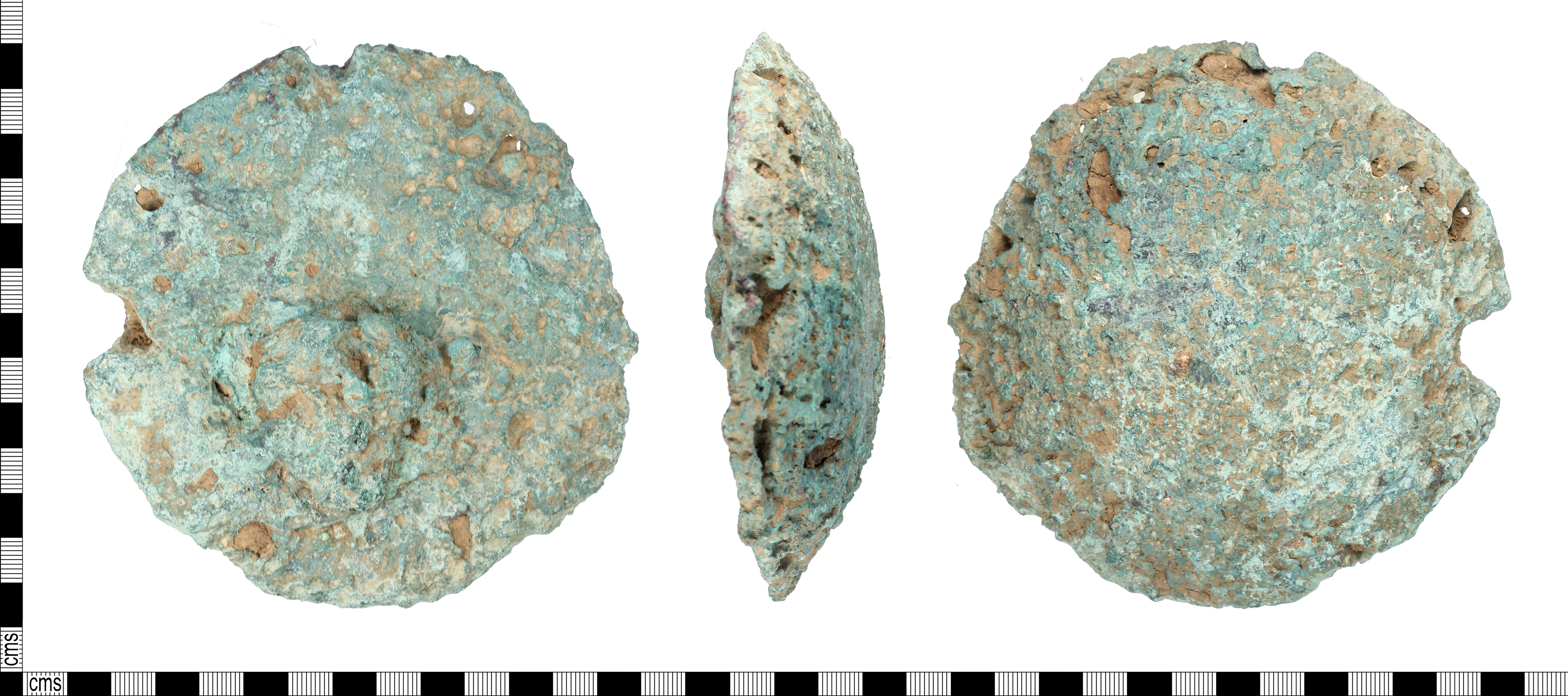
A copper-alloy plano-convex ingot. The top (on the left side of the center view) is flat with a large knop or swelling relating to the casting gate used in its production, and the bottom is convex.

Plano-convex ingots are lumps of metal with a flat or slightly concave top and a convex base. They are sometimes, misleadingly, referred to as bun ingots which imply the opposite concavity. They are most often made of copper, although other materials such as copper alloy, lead and tin are used. The first examples known were from the Near East during the 3rd and 2nd Millennia BC. By the end of the Bronze Age they were found throughout Europe and in Western and South Asia. Similar ingot forms continued in use during later Roman and Medieval periods.

== Manufacture ==
Traditionally bun ingots were seen as a primary product of smelting, forming at the base of a furnace beneath a layer of less dense slag. However, experimental reconstruction of copper smelting showed that regular plano-convex ingots are difficult to form within the smelting furnace, producing only small ingots or copper prills that need to be remelted. High purity copper bun ingots found in Late Bronze Age Britain and the Mediterranean seem to have undergone a secondary refining procedure.

The metallographic structure and high iron compositions of some plano-convex ingots suggest that they are the product of primary smelting. Tylecote suggested that Roman plano-convex copper ingots may have been formed by tapping both slag and copper in one step into a mould or pit outside the furnace. A similar process was described by Agricola in book IX of his De Re Metallica and has been replicated experimentally.

== Structure ==
Although all bun ingots share the same basic morphology, the details of their form and the texture of their convex base is dependent on the mould in which they cooled. Bun ingots made in purpose-dug depressions in sand can be highly variable in form even on the same site, whereas ingots cast in reusable moulds will form sets of identical “mould siblings”.

The composition of the metal and its cooling conditions affect structure. As the ingot cools gases are released giving the upper surface a “blistered” texture and if cooling takes place outside of the furnace, the outer surface often becomes oxidised. Casting in a warm mould or reheating furnace gives the ingot an even columnar structure running in the direction of cooling, whereas ingots cast in a cold mould have a distinctive two stage cooling structure with an outer chilled layer reflecting the rapid cooling of the bottom when it came into contact with the mould. A slightly concave upper surface can be produced if the top of the ingot cools more slowly than the bottom.

== Britain ==
=== Late Bronze Age ===
By the Late Bronze Age, the copper bun ingot, either in a simple form or with a hole in its center, had become the main form of copper ingot, replacing the earlier ‘bar ingot’ or rippenbarre. Weights of complete examples average ~4 kg, but examples of up to about 7 kg are known. Many early finds of British LBA bun ingots were unstratified but recently bun-shaped ingots and ingot fragments have been found in hoards alongside bronze artifacts and scrap metal. Several offshore finds of probable LBA date suggest that copper bun ingots may have been traded by sea during this period.

==== Composition and Structure ====
The copper is of high purity, although earlier examples are sometimes composed of arsenical copper. Tylecote suggested that they are not primary smelting products and instead were refined and recast. The macrostructure of a half section example from Gillan, Cornwall shows a columnar structure that probably indicates slow cooling in a reheating furnace or a warm mold, rather than from pouring into a cold mold.

=== Iron Age and Roman period ===
A second major group of British bun ingots date to the Roman period and are found mostly in the copper-rich highland areas of Wales and in Scotland. They are heavier than the LBA examples, with weights ranging between 12 and 22 kg.

Some have stamps clearly dating them to the Roman period including an example that reads SOCIO ROMAE NATSOL. The term "socio" suggests that the ingots were cast by a private company rather than by the state. Fraser Hunter reassessed the context of the Scottish examples and some of the unstamped Welsh examples and argues that they could in fact date to the Iron Age or at least reflect native rather than Roman copper working. Although ingots of any sort are not common in the British Iron Age, planoconvex or bun-shaped ingots exist, e.g. a tin ingot discovered within the Iron Age hillfort at Chun Castle, Cornwall.

==== Composition and Structure of Roman Ingots ====
The Roman Bun Ingots are less pure than the earlier LBA examples and Tylecote suggests that they may be a direct product of smelting. Theoretically such an ingot could be formed in the base of the furnace. However, this is problematic in the case of the stamped examples as this would require the furnace to be dismantled or else have a short shaft to allow access for stamping. As a solution the furnace could have been tapped into a mould at the completion of smelting. It is possible that both methods were used as several of the ingots seem to have had additional metal poured onto the top in order to allow stamping.

== Sources ==
- Tylecote, R. F. (1987). The Early History of Metallurgy in Europe. Longman. ISBN 978-0-582-49195-3.
