= Vacuum casting (elastomers) =

Casting process for elastomers

Vacuum casting is a casting process for elastomers using a vacuum to draw the liquid material into the mold. This process is used when air entrapment is a problem, there are intricate details or undercuts, or if the material is fiber or wire reinforced.

The main disadvantage to this process is the high price for the equipment.

== Process ==
The process starts by placing a two-piece silicone mold in a vacuum chamber. The raw material is mixed, degassed and then poured into the mold. The vacuum is then released and the mold removed from the chamber. Finally, the casting is cured in an oven and the mold removed to release the completed casting. The silicone mold can be reused.

In some machines the chamber where the material is mixed a pressure can be applied to increase the pressure differential between the mold cavity and the mixing chamber.

== See also ==
- Ablation casting
- Direct chill casting
