= Direct chill casting =

Metal casting method

Direct Chill casting is a method for the fabrication of cylindrical or rectangular solid ingots from non-ferrous metals, especially Aluminum, Copper, Magnesium and their alloys. The original ingots are usually further processed by other methods (rolling, forging, etc.). More than half of global aluminum production uses the Direct Chill casting process.

Direct Chill casting operates by pouring liquid metal continuously into a short mold (7.5–15 cm deep) that is open at the bottom. Only an outer layer of metal solidifies within the water-cooled mold. After leaving the closed mold at its bottom (e.g. with 5–15 cm/min), water is directly sprayed on the new ingot, continuing the solidification until complete. Only about 20% of the heat of the molten metal is removed through the mold wall, the secondary cooling (Direct Chill) contributing the majority of cooling. Typically the process is started with a starter-dummy block at the bottom of the mold, and runs until the maximum length possible in the machine is reached (up to 10 m).

The casting method reduces the internal stress in the cooled material by allowing contractions on all sides, as opposed to only on the top of the ingot in a traditional trough mold.
