= Photo sculpture =

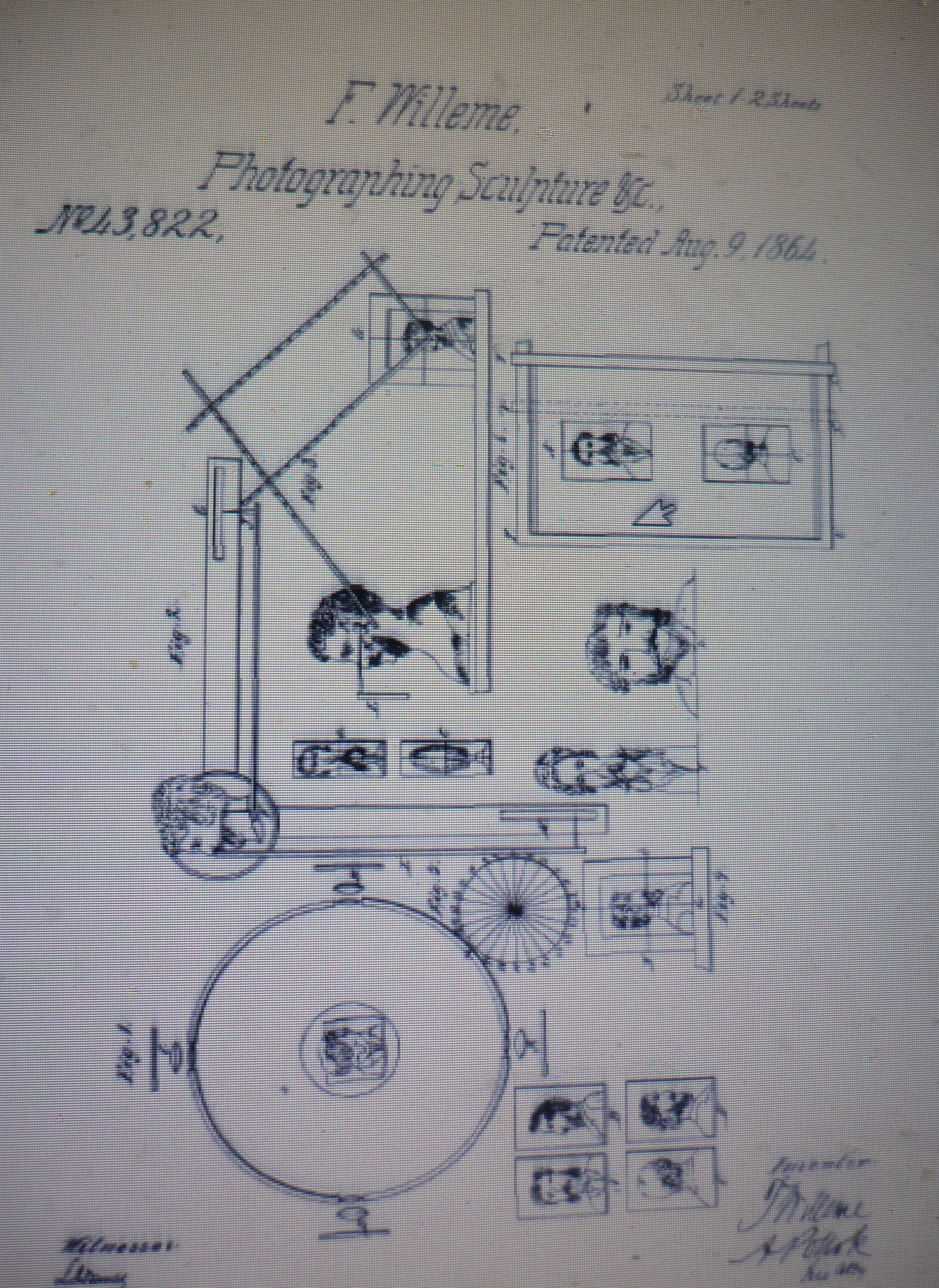
Diagram from the U.S. patent application

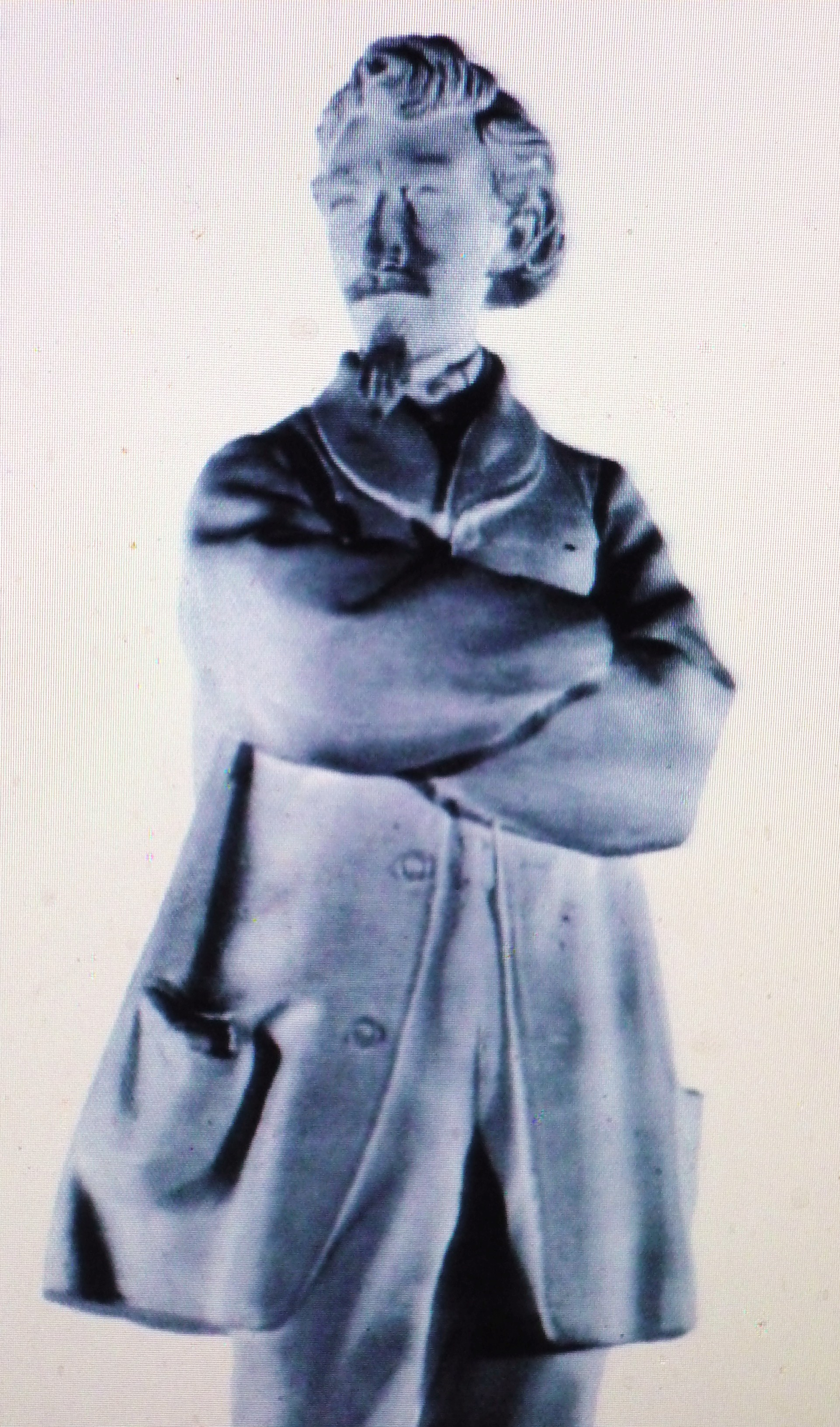
Photosculpture of François Willème from the 1860s

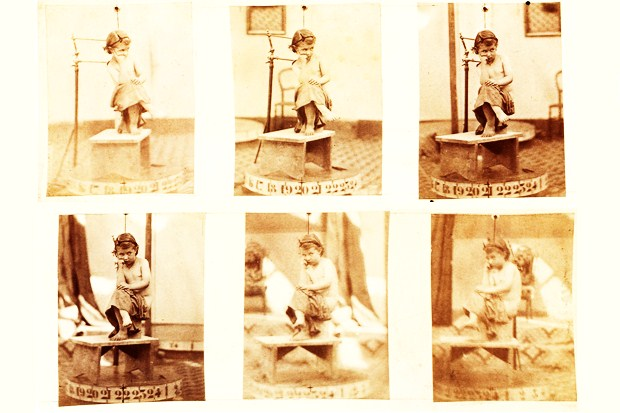
Series of photographs taken in 1865 for photosculpture

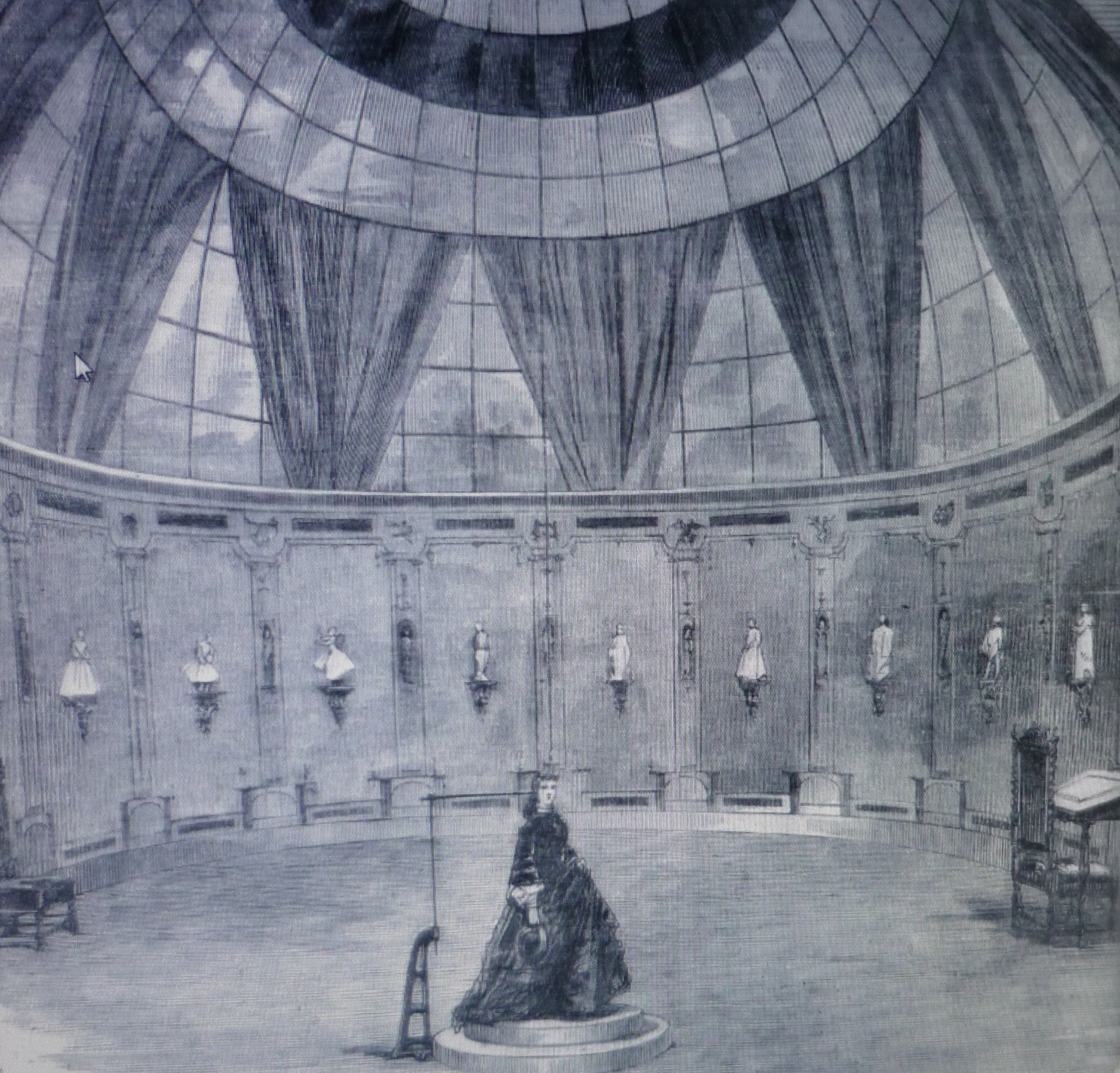
Willème's rotunda laboratory at 42 Avenue de Wagram in Paris

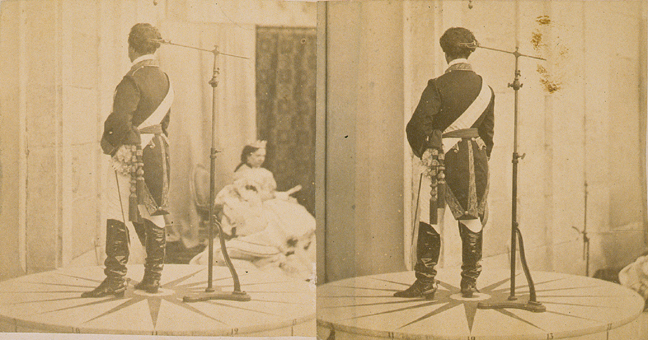
Two photographs for a photosculpture, of the King Consort of Spain, Francis, Duke of Cádiz (Queen Isabel II can be seen in the background )

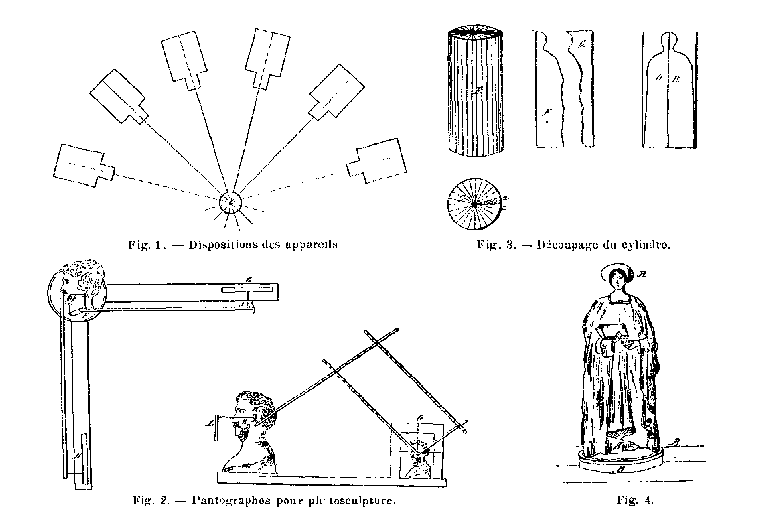
Magazine illustration explaining the process (1897)

A photo-sculpture is the reproduction of persons, animals, and things, in 3-dimensions by taking a series of photos in the round and using them as synchronized photo projections to create a sculpture. The process was invented and patented by French artist (painter, sculptor and photographer) François Willème in 1860. He took a series of photographs from around a subject and used them to carve a likeness of the figure. Contemporary photo sculptures are obtained through a process of 3D scanning and 3D printing. The results are small statues that represent the portrayed entity.

Examples of photographic sculptures include the work of sculptural artist Gwon Osang and experimental artist Oliver Herring.

== Additional sources ==
- Sobieszek, Robert A. 1980. "Sculpture as the Sum of Its Profiles: François Willème and Photosculpture in France, 1859-1868". The Art Bulletin. 62 (4): 617–630.
- Leticia Azcue Brea y Mario Fernández Albarés. "La Photoscultpture. Su desarrollo en la España de Isabel II (1860-1868) = Photosculpture. Its development in the Spain of Isabella II (1860-1868)". Academia: Boletín de la Real Academia de Bellas Artes de san Fernando, Nº 116. Primer y segundo semestres de 2014, pp. 109–154, Madrid 2015, (es separata, español / inglés).
