= François Willème =

French sculptor, painter and photographer, the inventor of photosculpture

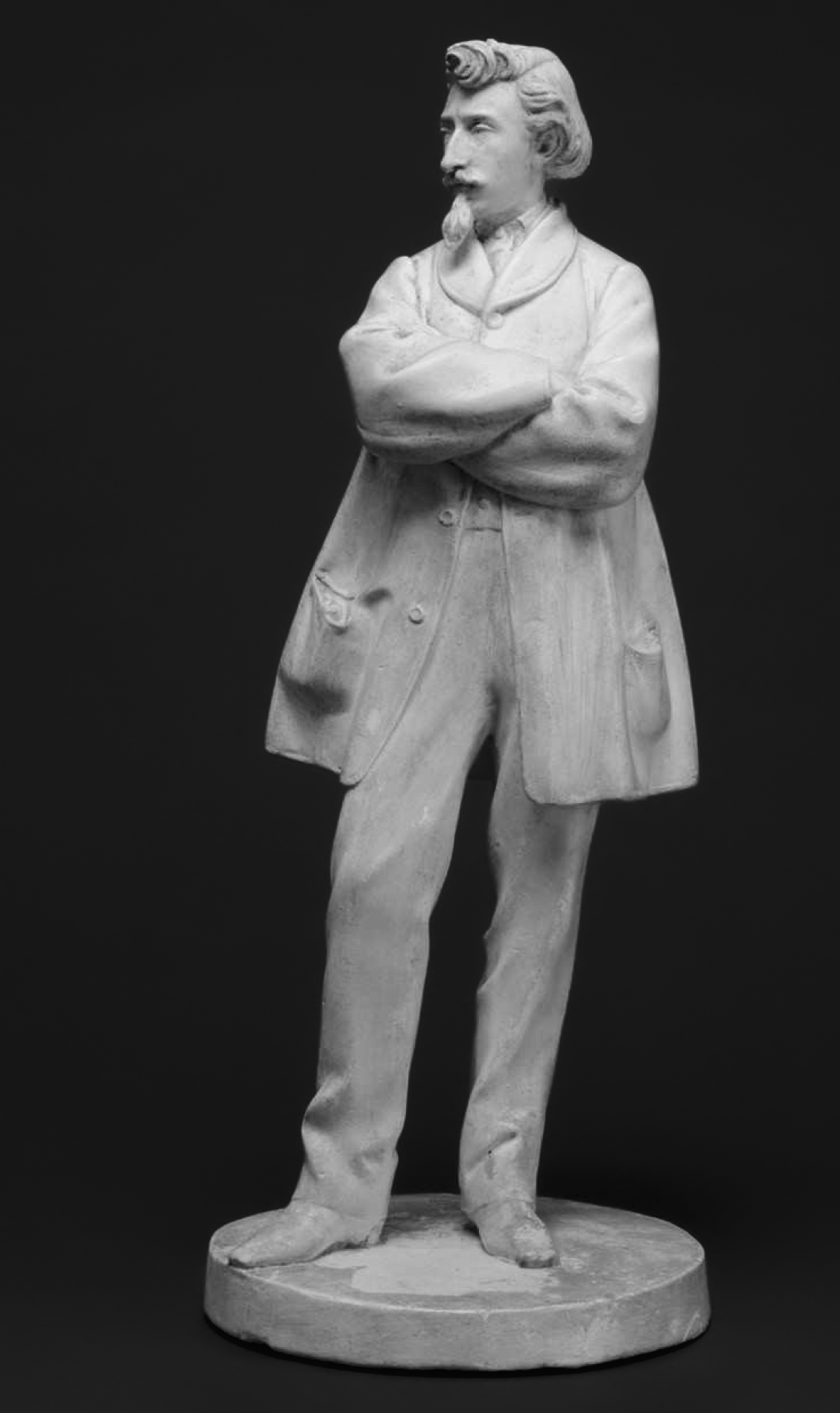
Statuette of François Willème standing, obtained by his photosculpture method. Bisque porcelain, 37.5 cm H. Musée des Arts et Métiers de Paris

François Willème (27 May 1830 – 31 January 1905) was a French painter, sculptor and photographer who in 1859 invented the 'photosculpture', also known as 'sculpture by light', a means of generating 3D forms in a variety of media, clay, marble or electroplated bronze, from photographs taken by a battery of cameras.

== Early life ==
Willème was born in Sedan where he undertook his primary and secondary education. His parents were Marie-Joséphone (née Foy) and Denis Willème who moved their family to Paris, where François studied sculpture and painting at the School of Fine Arts in Paris, with history painter Henri Félix Emmanuel Philippoteaux and married Celine Lacaille. He was using photography as an aid in his practice of sculpture and was making clay moulds for bronzes.

== Inventor ==
In 1859 Willème conceived the idea of photographing the subject 'in the round' with multiple cameras in order to accurately record the form of his human subjects, in effect, "a cybernetic production of likeness" (Auger). As Antoine Claudet, introducing the invention in England, expressed it in The Photographic Journal of 15 October 1864:

however extraordinary such a prognostication might appear, however difficult at first thought it may be to understand the possible connection between flat representation of objects and their solid form, it has been proved that from flat photographs a bust, a statue, or other object of three dimensions can be made by a mechanical process without the necessity of the sculptor's copying the original, or even seeing it at all. Yet the result is a perfect facsimile of the original! Moreover the work is executed in one-tenth of the time required for modelling by hand. This beautiful application of photography is called Photosculpture, and is the invention of Mr. Willème, an eminent French sculptor.

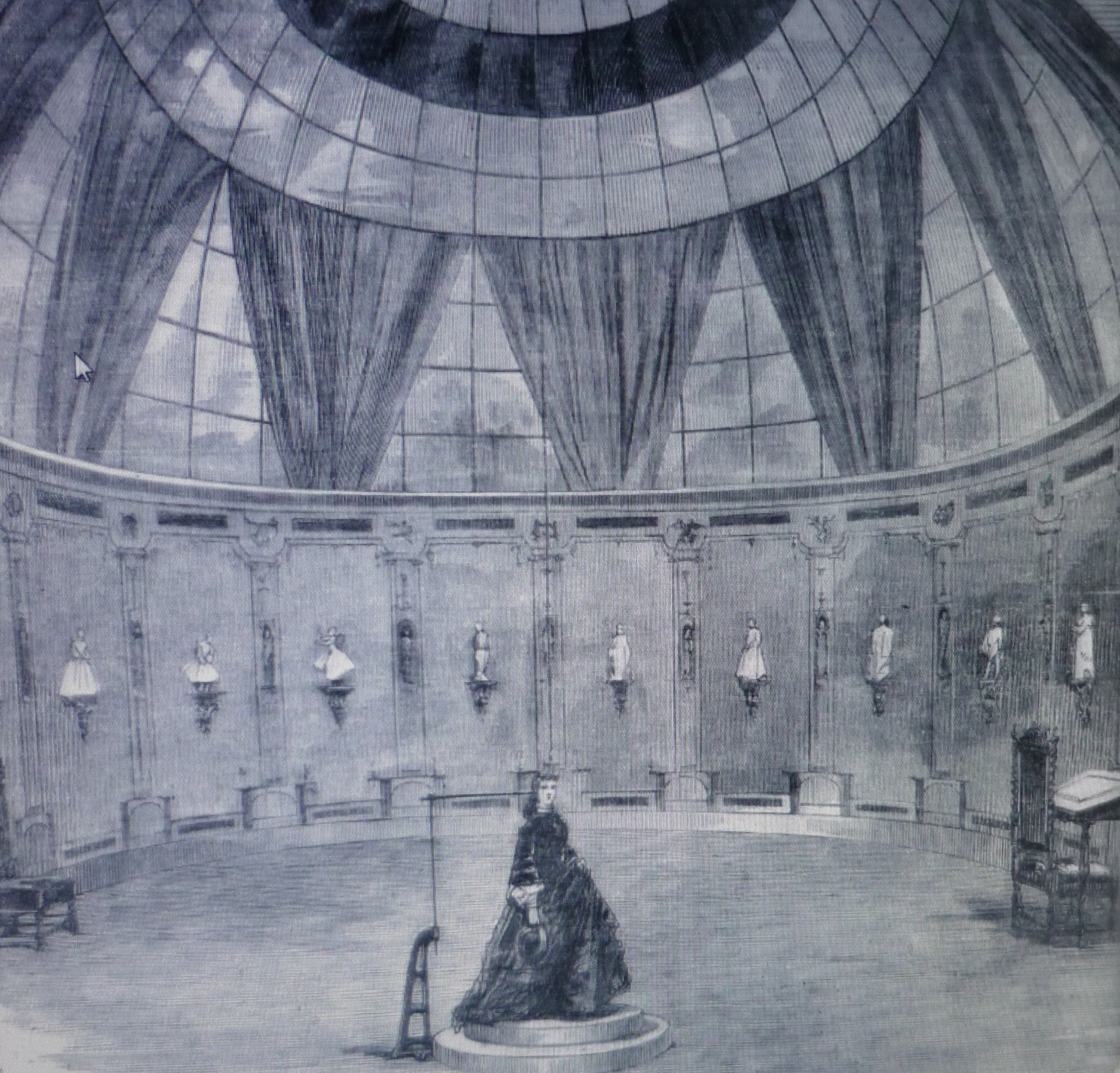
Willème's rotunda laboratory at 42 Avenue de Wagram in Paris

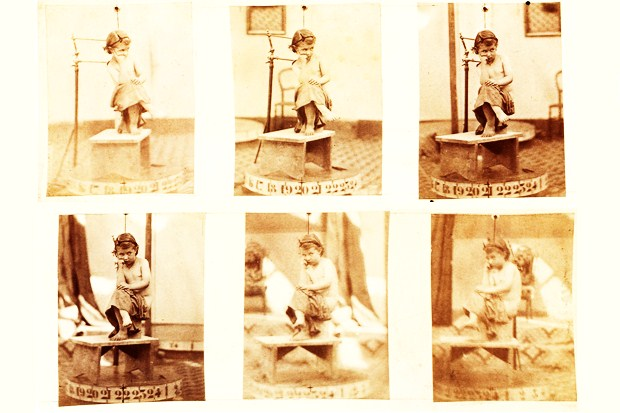
Series of photographs taken in 1865 for a photosculpture

Willème developed and patented (in France on 14 August 1860 and in the United States on 9 August 1864) this process for producing portrait photosculptures. One of the first tests he made was François Willème standing, and is probably the one which he exhibited at the announcement of the invention in 1863, a plaster copy of which is in the George Eastman Museum in Rochester, New York, from the collection of Gabriel Cromer, who had worked with Willème. He in turn had Lanson make a copy for the French Photographic Society, a work preserved since 1926 in the Musée des Arts et Métiers de Paris.

With the support of investors, most prominently Edgar Aimé, the bankers Émile and Isaac Pereire, Soubeyran and Paul Dalloz, he formed the Société Générale de Photosculpture and opened a commercial premises in 1862 in a studio at the address of the Society, 42 Avenue de Wagram (then called Boulevard or Avenue de l'Étoile) near the Arc de Triomphe. The system employed a circular photographic "salon" approximately 10 metres in diameter, with a glass dome and platform beneath for the sitter who posed with their head under a silver orb suspended to mark the exact centre of the rotunda.

Around the perimeter, twenty-four cameras—concealed behind carved busts, themselves produced by the process—exposed photographic plates simultaneously, with a brief 5-10 second exposure, from all angles via cord-linked shutters. The subject could then step down, as their role was complete.

In the workshop, the negatives were enlarged using projections onto a translucent screen. From this an operator traced the contour of each silhouette with one arm of a pantograph, while the arm at the other end was equipped with a knife which carved the corresponding profile into a rotating block of porcelain clay. The pantograph could produce versions of reduced scale. Repeating the operation for each view produced a solid form composed of the "sum of profiles", which a sculptor then refined before the work was bisque-fired or cast in plaster, bronze, or other material.

=== Publication ===
A successful public presentation by the Société Générale de Photosculpture of statuettes in plaster, bisque porcelain and bronze, appeared as part of a photographic exhibition in the Palace of Industry in the Champs-Élysées in Paris. In May 1861 Willème published on his invention in Le Moniteur de la photographie, while François Moigno of Le Cosmos, wrote at length about the invention in Revue Photographique.

The Bulletin de la Société française de photographie described the public announcement, and reactions to it, of his new photographic application for sculpture and its technical challenges, demonstrated with an example in wood.

Other discussions in print closely following Willème's included A. Oppermann's:

François Willème proposes to obtain, in a purely mechanical way, the sculptural reproduction of any model, living or inanimate, using photographic images representing the model seen from different angles. The method which Mr. Willème calls photo-sculpture (…)

Ernest Lacan wrote in December 1861 a survey of current developments in photography in Le Moniteur de la photographie:

Le Moniteur de la Photographie published in its November issue a description of the method devised by Mr. Willème for modeling a statuette, bust, or bas-relief using an autograph and a number of photographic prints, each reproducing a different profile of the model. We have before us a work recently produced using this process: a reduction of Falconet's Bather [1757, Louvre].

This graceful statuette is 30 centimetres high [the original: 80.5cm]; it was created using twenty-four prints of approximately 10 centimetres each. One need only see this specimen to understand the full potential of this ingenious method...by observing Mr. Willème at work, we were able to realise how little work he needs to do to complete his model. It is at most equivalent to what a sculptor does after what practitioners call the final shaping of a marble, or, if you prefer, the retouching required for the best photographic prints, once all the manipulations are complete.

Having witnessed numerous and conclusive trials, and having recognized the modest price at which molds made from the clay figures obtained in this way can be delivered, we remain convinced that photosculpture will take its place among the most fruitful applications of photography and that it will quickly gain public favor.

...and in more detail in La Revue Photographique, later describing an example as one of the “more charming oeuvres of the XVIIIe century,” while Théophile Gautier, in the Universal Monitor in 1863, wrote that the inventor was a "prodigy".

=== Commercialisation ===
Advertisement: Portrait sculpture after nature obtained mechanically. Ten-second pose. 42 Avenue de Wagram. Terracotta, electroplating, plaster, bronze, bisque porcelain

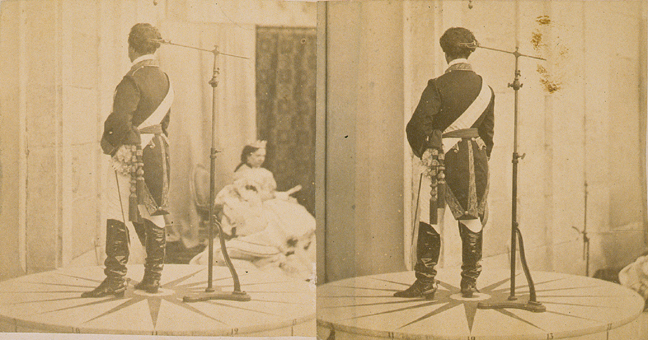
Two photographs for a photosculpture, probably of the King of Spain

Public notice followed François Moigno's discussion of the process in 'Cosmos' (1861). In 1863, financiers backed the ''Société générale de photosculpture'', and the first Paris establishment opened on the Boulevard de l’Étoile, distinguished by a glass cupola and a façade ornamented with statuettes. A second branch followed on the Boulevard des Italiens. Willème cultivated press support and attracted elite clientele of the Second Empire, including the imperial circle and prominent figures from literary and artistic society. Among his clients were Charles de Morny, Rainulphe d'Osmond, Sosthène II de La Rochefoucauld, Théophile Gautier, Bernard Pierre Magnan, Ferdinand de Lesseps, and Augustine Brohan.

The Victoria and Albert Museum holds a sculpture of the first Director of the V&A, Henry Cole, and records that:

His Diary for 1867 notes that he went for a sitting for a Photosculpture at the Photo Sculpture Gallery in Paris in September 1867. He also notes the bust was modelled by 'Lanzirotti'; this must have been the sculptor Antonio Giovanni Lanzirotti (1839-1921), who worked in Paris in the mid-19th century. The sculpture was complete by 12 November of that year, again according to Cole's Diary.

In 1866 Huston and Kurtz founded the Société de photosculpture in New York on 895-897 Broadway Avenue, instructed by one of Willème's employees, François Chardeau, who assisted in the portrait sculptures of United States President Ulysses S. Grant and of Admiral David G. Farragut photographs for which are held amongst an extensive archive of photosculpture imagery in the George Eastman Museum, Rochester.

Photosculpture was on display at the 1867 Universal Exhibition in "a building composed in the middle of a polygonal section, flanked by two rectangular wings," along the grand avenue toward the Quai d'Orsay, and next to a building holding an exhibition of Maréchal and Co. stained-glass, and adjacent to the Lepaute windmill.

However, some commentators rejected the 'mechanical' quality of the 'frozen' figures and their 'softening' of detail. The expense of the process bankrupted Willème amid the contemporary vogue for the carte-de-visite (a format that then could be enlarged to life-size with the solar camera), and widespread fascination with the three-dimensionality of stereoscopy and the more portable stereoscope, his invention was not taken up by others, leading to its demise. Contemporary 3D scanning and printing have revived the idea of 'photo sculpture'. The bust of Claude-Joseph Bonnet (1786–1867), a silk industrialist of Jujurieux, produced on 26 May 1867, and conserved in the Nicéphore Niepce Museum in Chalon-sur-Saône, was among the last produced by Willème. The original studio closed in that year, despite the support of critics, artists and entrepreneurs, though after Willème's departure in 1869, the photosculpture company continued its activity without him at its branch at 35 Boulevard des Capucines operating at least until August 1874.

Minkin and Dawson in 2022, reconstructed Willème's photosculpture apparatus at Winchester School of art 2022 and video of their experiment was displayed in 2023 at the 12th Festival de la photographie et de la ville, in Sedan, France.

== Return to Sedan ==
In 1867 Willème abandoned Paris, though he remained sole owner of the Photosculpture Society. He returned to live in his hometown in 1869. There, he continued making sculpture, by conventional means, including England Coming to the Rescue of France. He was partner in business with C. Jacquard a photographer of local stereo views. From 1872 he was the drawing instructor at Turenne College. Antoine Lumière photographed him in 1885.

By 1900 he had retired with his wife to his daughter's house in Roubaix, near Lille, where on 31 January 1905 he died, almost forgotten. His brief obituary in Le Rappel mentions only that he used photographs to make portraits busts and statuettes. Le Temps in 1909 in an article about another form of photosculpture using only four cameras, makes no mention of Willème.

The city of Sedan holds Willème's bust of Laurent Cunin-Gridaine of 1890, a painting L'Église du collège: chapelle Saint Louis, and three albums of his photographs made at the request of Auguste Philippoteaux, deputy mayor of Sedan, and architect Édouard Depaquit, after 1880 of fortifications during their demolition following the 1870 Battle of Sedan. That site is now the Musée du Château fort, which holds his work.

== Awards ==
During his career as a photosculptor, François Willème was rewarded with medals at exhibitions, and received the insignia of the order of Charles III of Spain.

== Exhibitions ==
- 2022, January 19, 2022 (ongoing as at 2026): Willème represented in European and American Art: Late Renaissance through 1900. Robert Mondavi Family Gallery, Cantor Arts Center, Stanford University
- 2023, 19 April–9 July: Dimensions: Digital Art Since 1859. Pittlerwerke, Leipzig, Germany
- 2023: 10 June–30 July: URBI&ORBI, Festival de la photographie et de la ville, 12ème édition, Sedan, France
- 2025, 6 October 2025 – 1 January 2026: El 3D del siglo XIX ('19th-Century 3D'), Galería de las Colecciones Reales (Royal Collections Gallery), Madrid. Nineteen photo-sculptures; presented by Víctor Cageao, director of the Royal Collections Gallery; and curated by María José Suárez, of the Patrimonio Nacional (National Heritage); and Leticia Azcue Brea of the Prado Museum. The exhibition featured members of the Spanish royal family during the reign of Isabella II; the queen herself, her husband, King Consort Francisco de Asís, and their children Alfonso (the future Alfonso XII) and the Infantas Isabella, popularly known as La Chata, Eulalia, and Pilar in works created in 1865 when Willème was resident in Spain.

== Collections ==
- George Eastman House, Rochester
- Carnavalet Museum, Paris
- Albertina Museum in Vienna, Austria
- Victoria and Albert Museum, London
- Royal Collections Gallery, Madrid
- Maison du Patrimoine, Sedan
- Musée du Château fort, Sedan

== Gallery ==
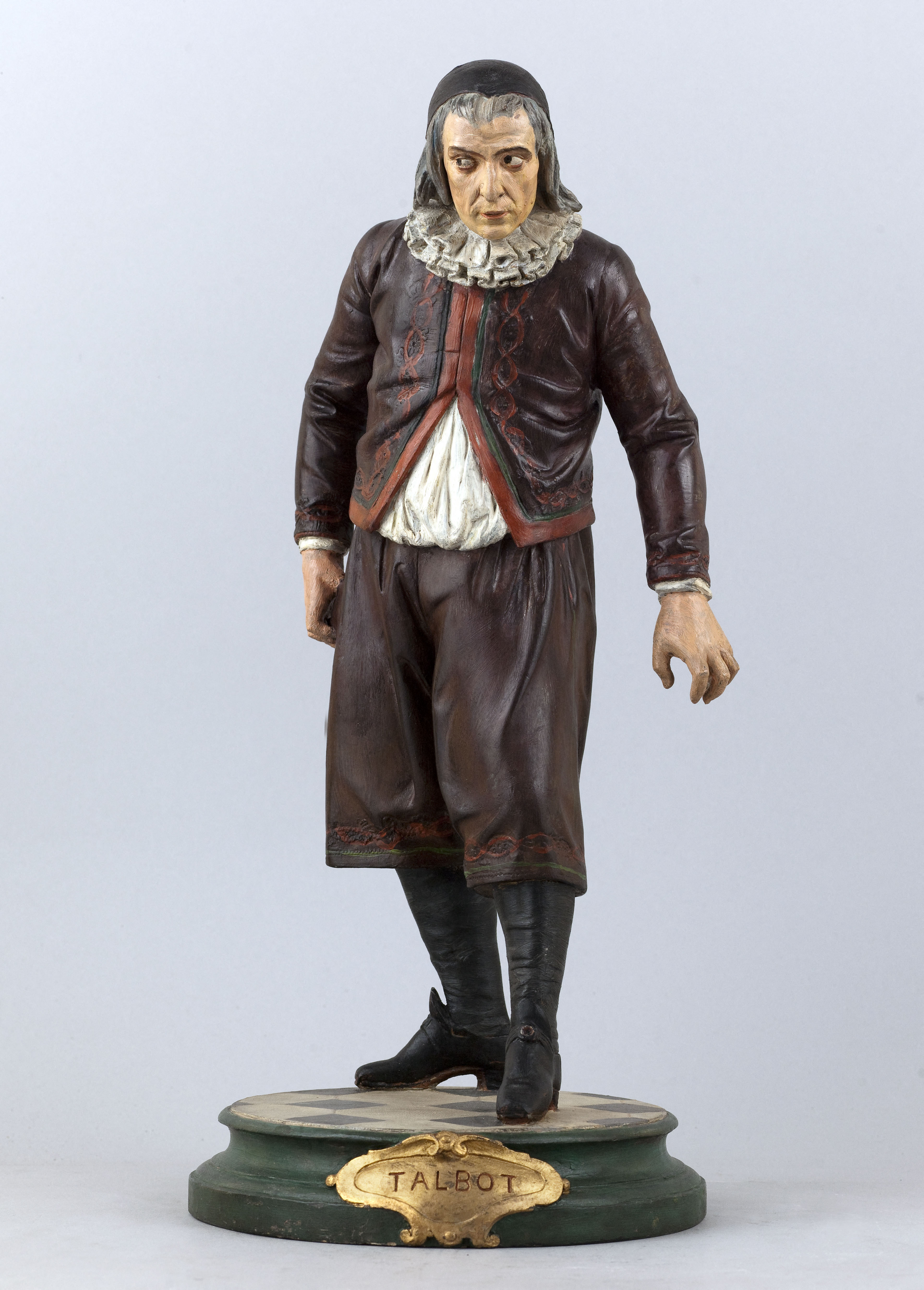
Portrait of Denis-Stanislas Montalant called Talbot (1824–1904), actor and member of the Comédie Française

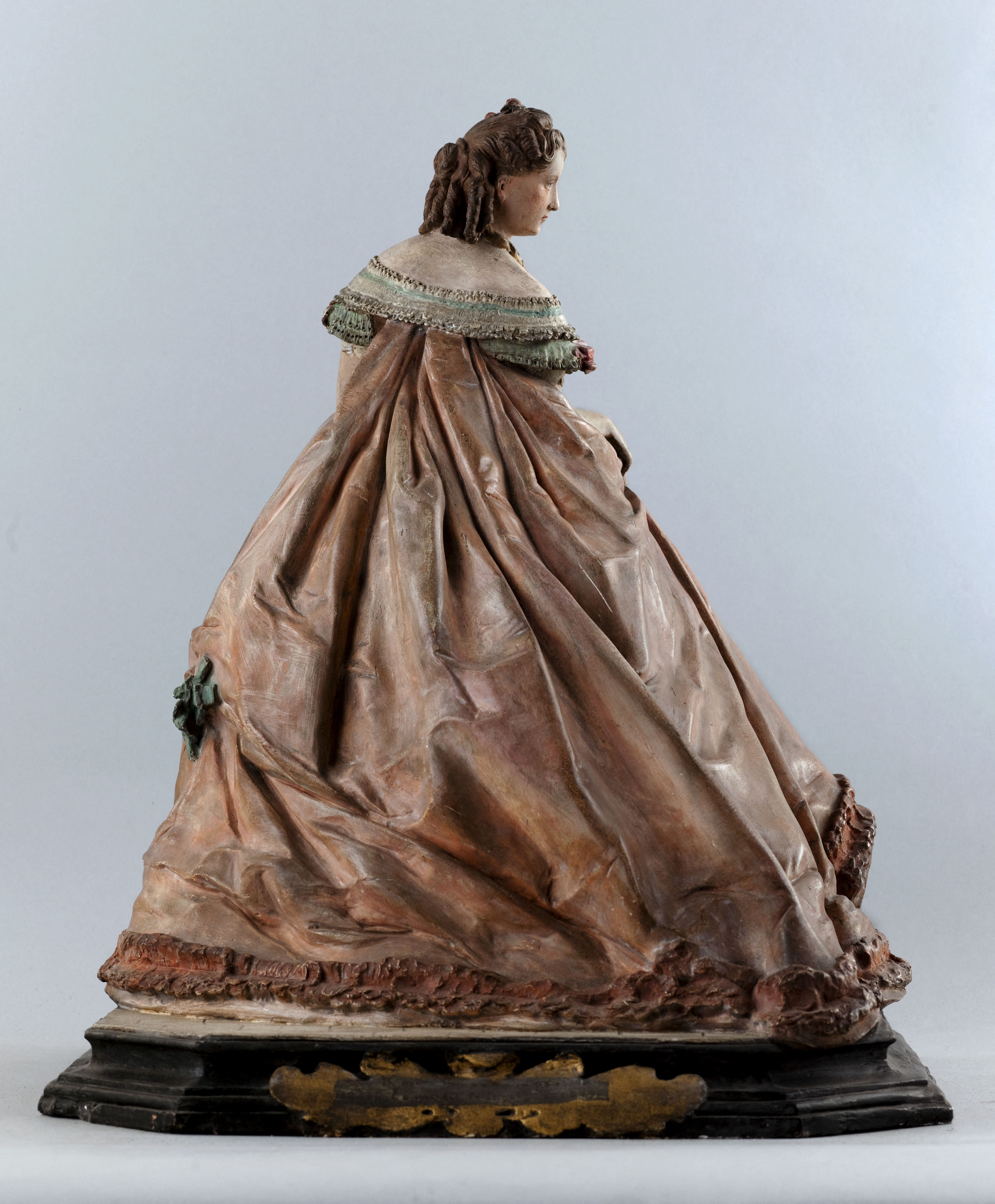
Portrait of Céleste-Rose Beauregard known as Rose Deschamps (1845-), actress

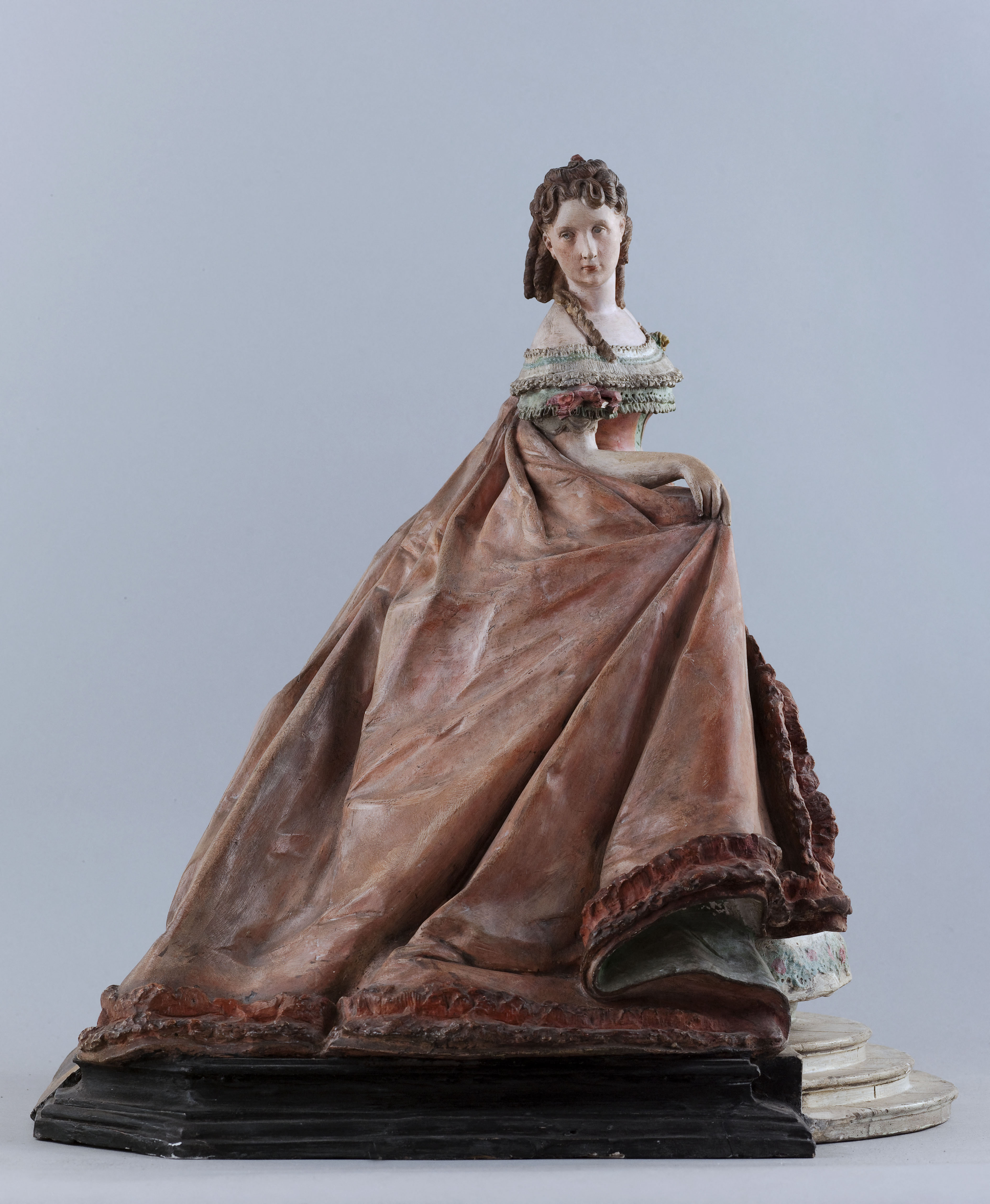
Portrait of Céleste-Rose Beauregard known as Rose Deschamps (1845-), actress

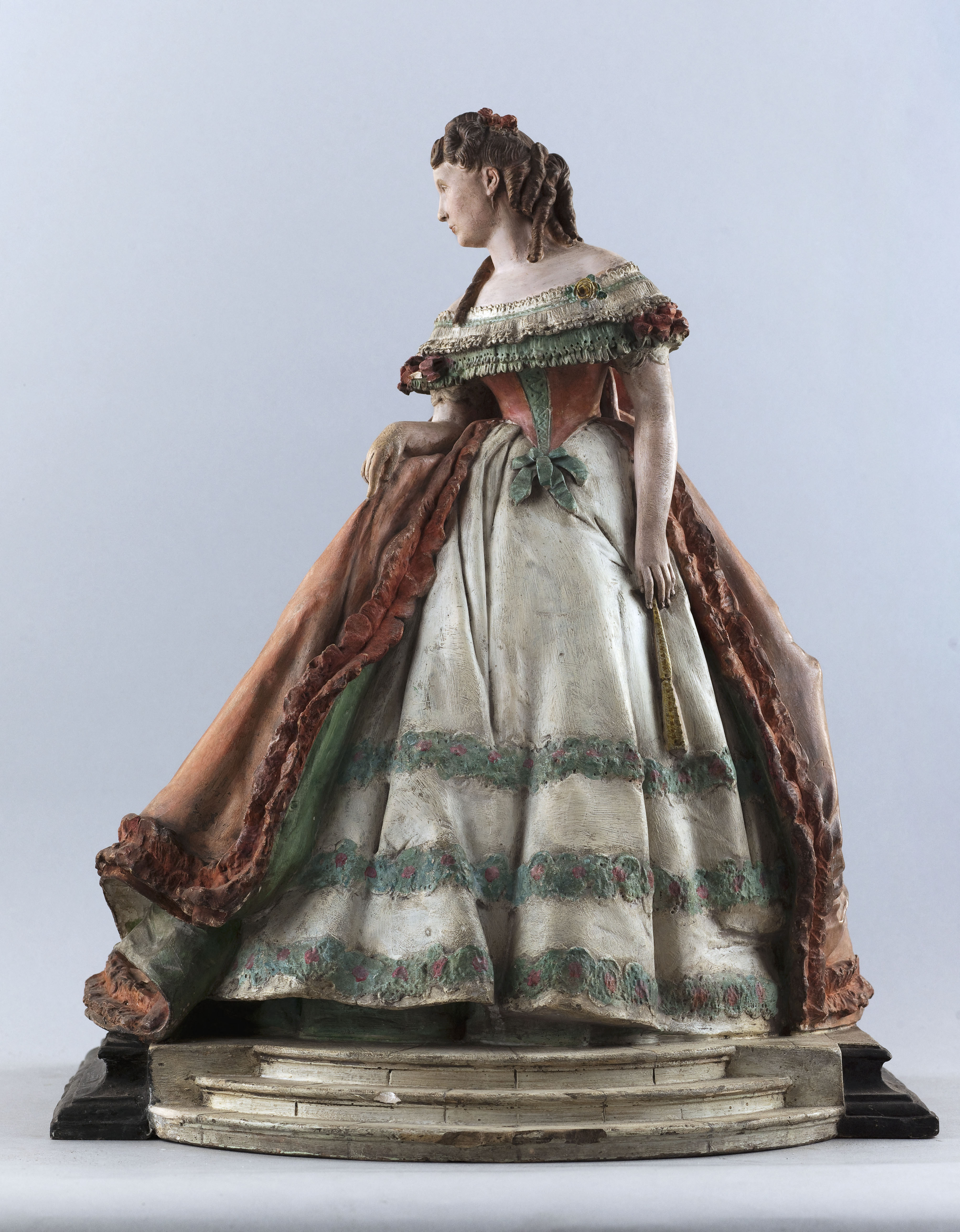
Portrait of Céleste-Rose Beauregard known as Rose Deschamps (1845-), actress

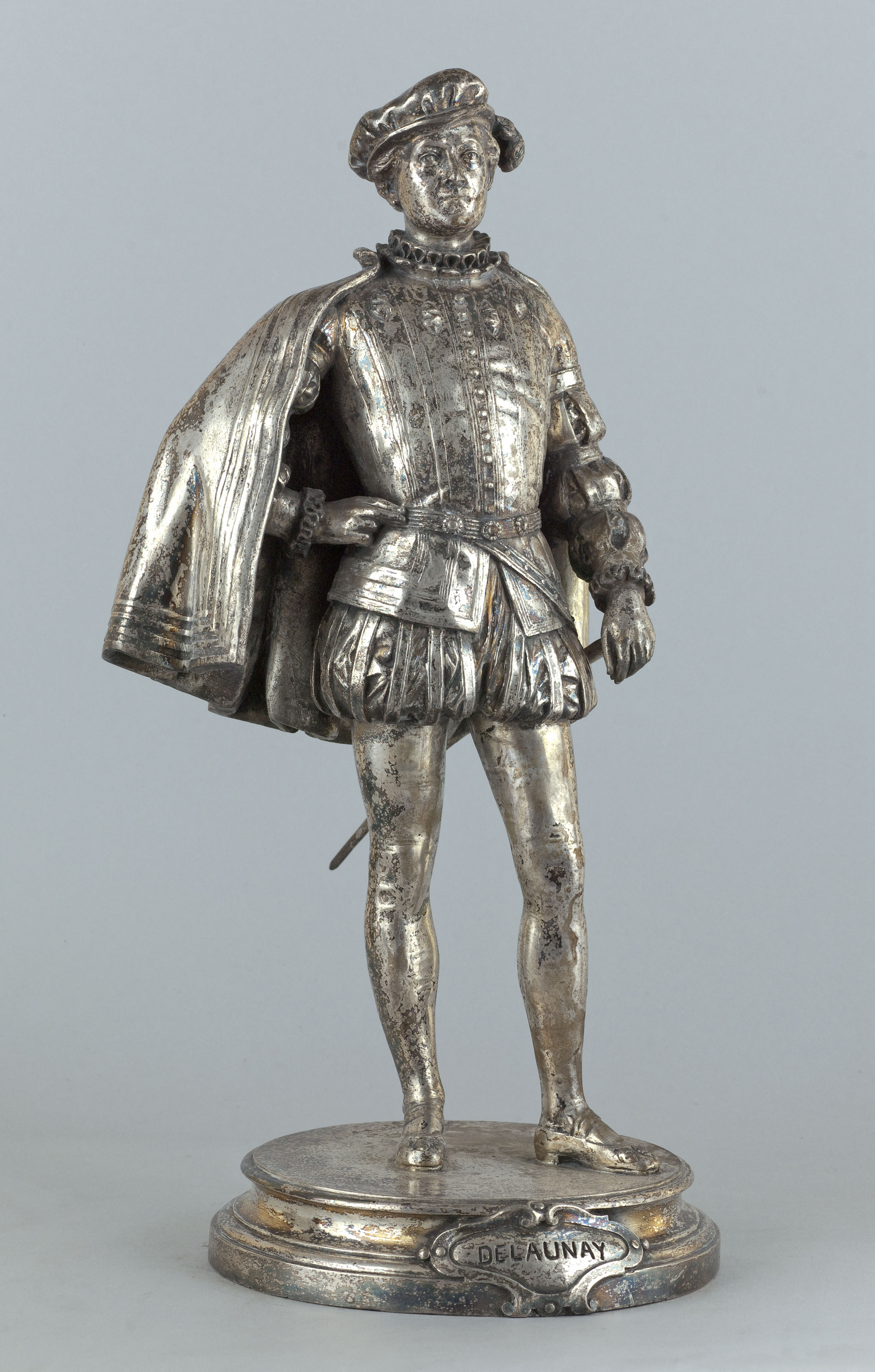
Portrait of Louis-Arsène Delaunay (1826–1903), actor, member of the Comédie Française and professor of the Conservatory

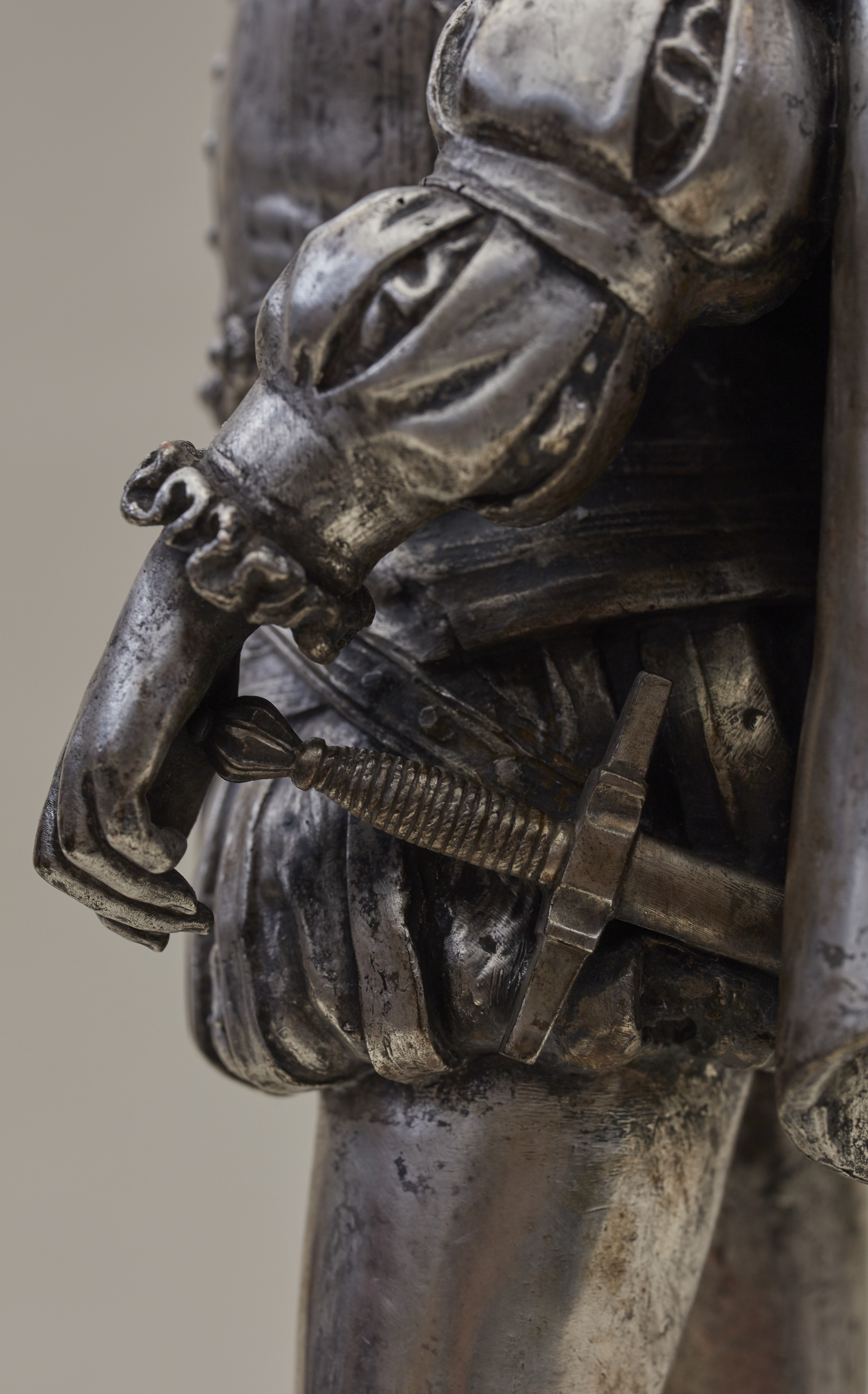
Portrait of Louis-Arsène Delaunay (1826–1903), actor, member of the Comédie Française and professor of the Conservatory (detail)

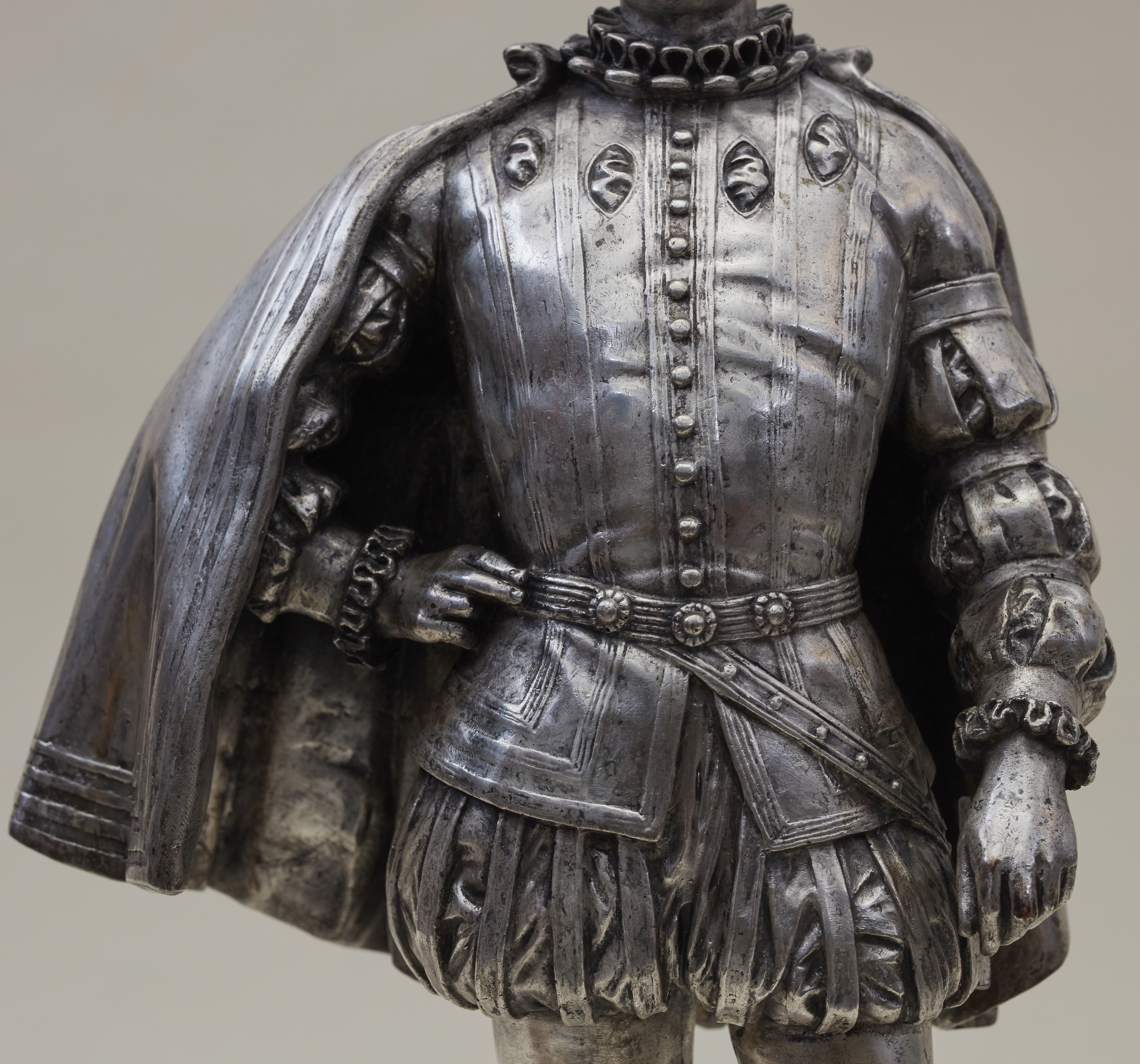
Portrait of Louis-Arsène Delaunay (1826–1903), actor, member of the Comédie Française and professor of the Conservatory (detail)

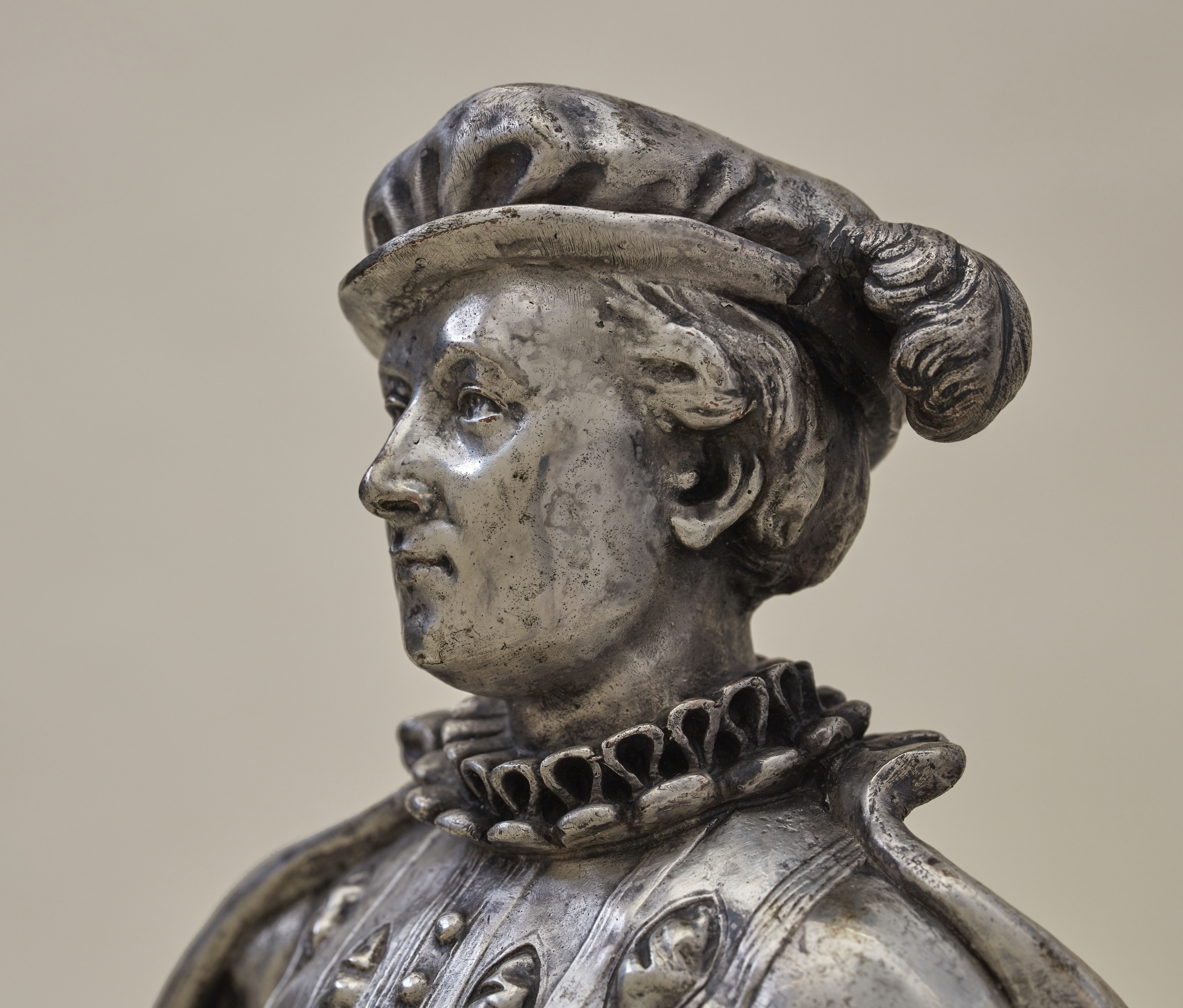
Louis-Arsène Delaunay (1826–1903), comedian, member of the Comédie Française and professor of the Conservatory

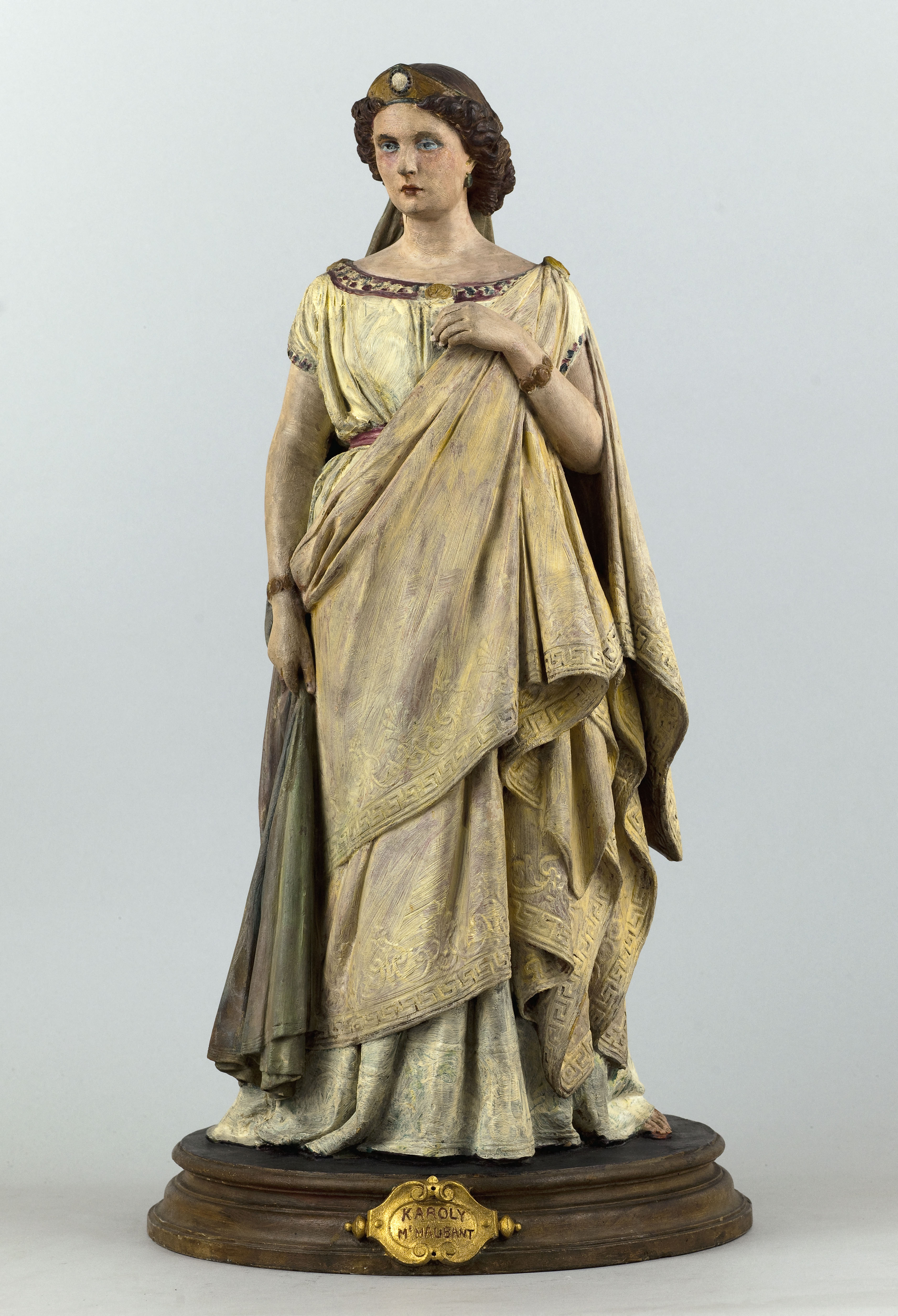
Portrait of Caroline Duveau or Duvau known as Miss Karoly, later Madame Maubant, actress

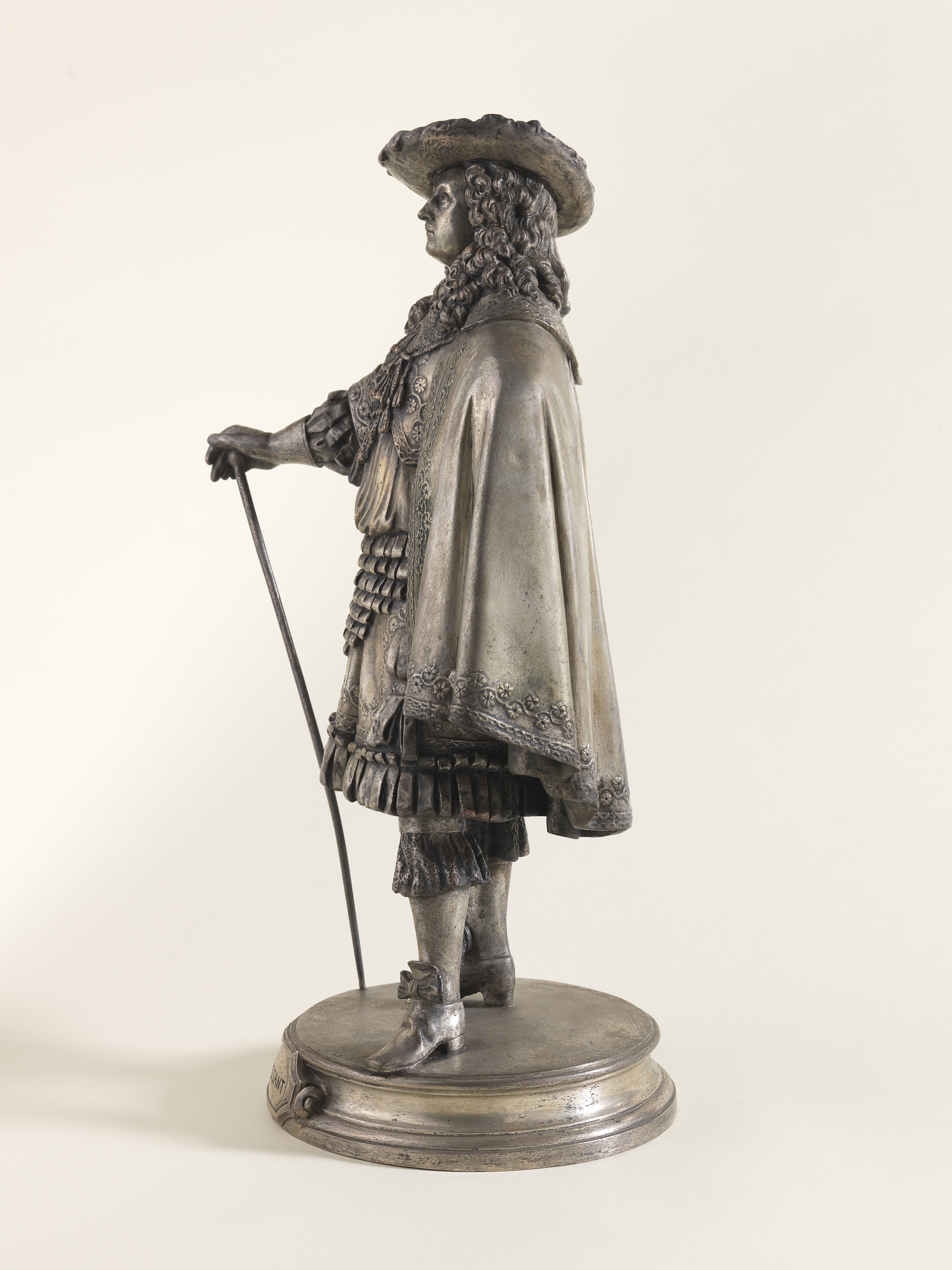
Jean-Baptiste-François Bressant (1815–1866), photo sculpture in bronze or electroplated bronze
