= Nordlander =

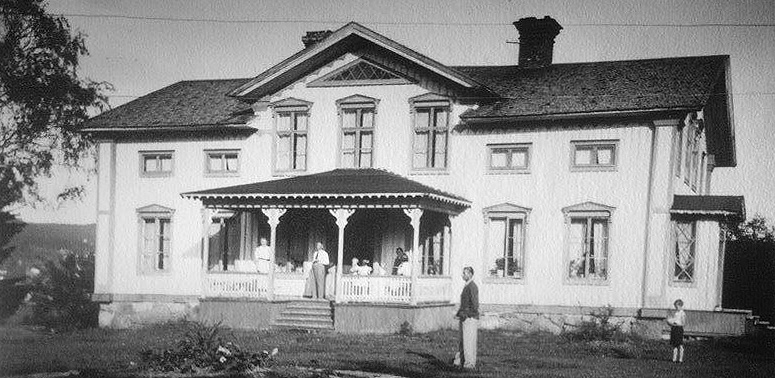
- Norrland estate in Bjärtrå, Ångermanland, Sweden (1930), origin of the Nordlander family.
- Origin: Norrland, Bjärtrå, Ångermanland; Sweden
- Estate: Norrland

Nordlander is a Swedish family originating from the village of Norrland, Bjärtrå in Ångermanland, Sweden. Daniel Persson (1683–1763) relocated to the Norrland estate from his former residence at the crown land (Swedish: Kungsgård) of Bjärtrå, a power house in Ångermanland until the establishment of Härnösand in 1585. Subsequently, his sons Erik Nordlander (1723–1782) and Nils Nordlander (1726–1775) assumed the family name in accordance with that of the estate and its village.

== Members in selection ==
- Daniel Persson (1683–1763), holder of the crown land of Bjärtrå, and later Norrland estate
  - Daniel Nordlander (1763–1842), Sea Captain, distinguished for valor in the Russo–Swedish Wars
    - Nils Nordlander (1796–1874), prelate, Member of Parliament of the Riksdag of Sweden and founder of Skellefteå
      - Daniel Nordlander (1829–1890), Lieutenant Colonel of the Swedish Army, Adjutant to King Charles XV of Sweden and Member of Parliament of the Riksdag of Sweden
      - Nils Johan Nordlander (1834–1866), deputy Hundred Governor
      - Anna Nordlander (1843–1877), artist
    - Daniel Nordlander (1803–1836), Municipal commissioner
    - John Nordlander (1894–), Sea Captain and humanitarian of the World War II
  - Nils Brage Nordlander (1919-2009), physician and medical researcher, President of the County council of Uppsala
  - Brita Nordlander (1921-2009), teacher and President of the Municipal council of Uppsalad

== See also ==
- Norrland (village)
