= Nordlander (name) =

Nordlander is predominantly Swedish personal name assumed by the family of Nordlander, as well as with other people.

== Families ==
- Nordlander from Bjärtrå

== Other people ==
- Axel Nordlander (1879–1962), Swedish officer and equestrian
- Bert-Ola Nordlander (born 1938), Swedish ice hockey player
- Kristina Persson-Nordlander (born 1969), Swedish Olympic archer
- Inger Nordlander (born 1938), Swedish politician
- Mats Nordlander (born 1963), Swedish Olympic archer, husband of Kristina
- Maud Nordlander (born 1943), Swedish curler
