= Sandslåns SK =

Swedish sports club

- Full name: Sandslåns sportklubb
- Nicknames: SSK
- Sport: association football bandy ice hockey
- Founded: 1927
- Based in: Sandslån, Sweden
- Stadium: Flottarvallen

Sandslåns SK is a now non-active sports club in Sandslån, Sweden. The club was established in 1927 and was known as the "bandy pride of Ångermanland", also nicknamed Timmerkusarna. In 1950, the bandy team reached the Norrland Championship final., and lost to Haparandapojkarna. The bandy team played its home games at Flottarvallen.

The bandy team played in the Swedish top division in the 1961 and the 1975–1976 seasons. In the 1977–1978 season Anders Wedin, playing for the club, became the Swedish second division topscorer.

The club has even played once in the World Cup.

The soccer team played in the Swedish third division in 1962.

In 1949 the junior soccer team won the district championship.

During the early 1950s the club even ran ice hockey activity for a short time.
