= Anna Nordlander =

Swedish artist from Skellefteå (1843–1879)

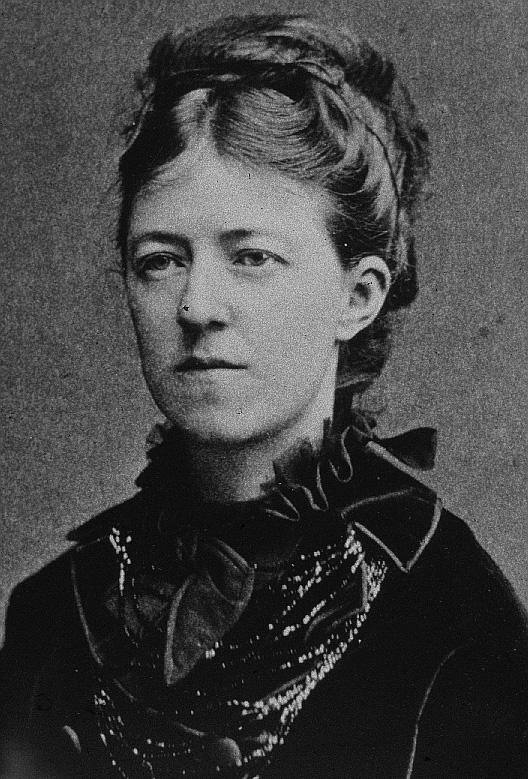
Anna Nordlander

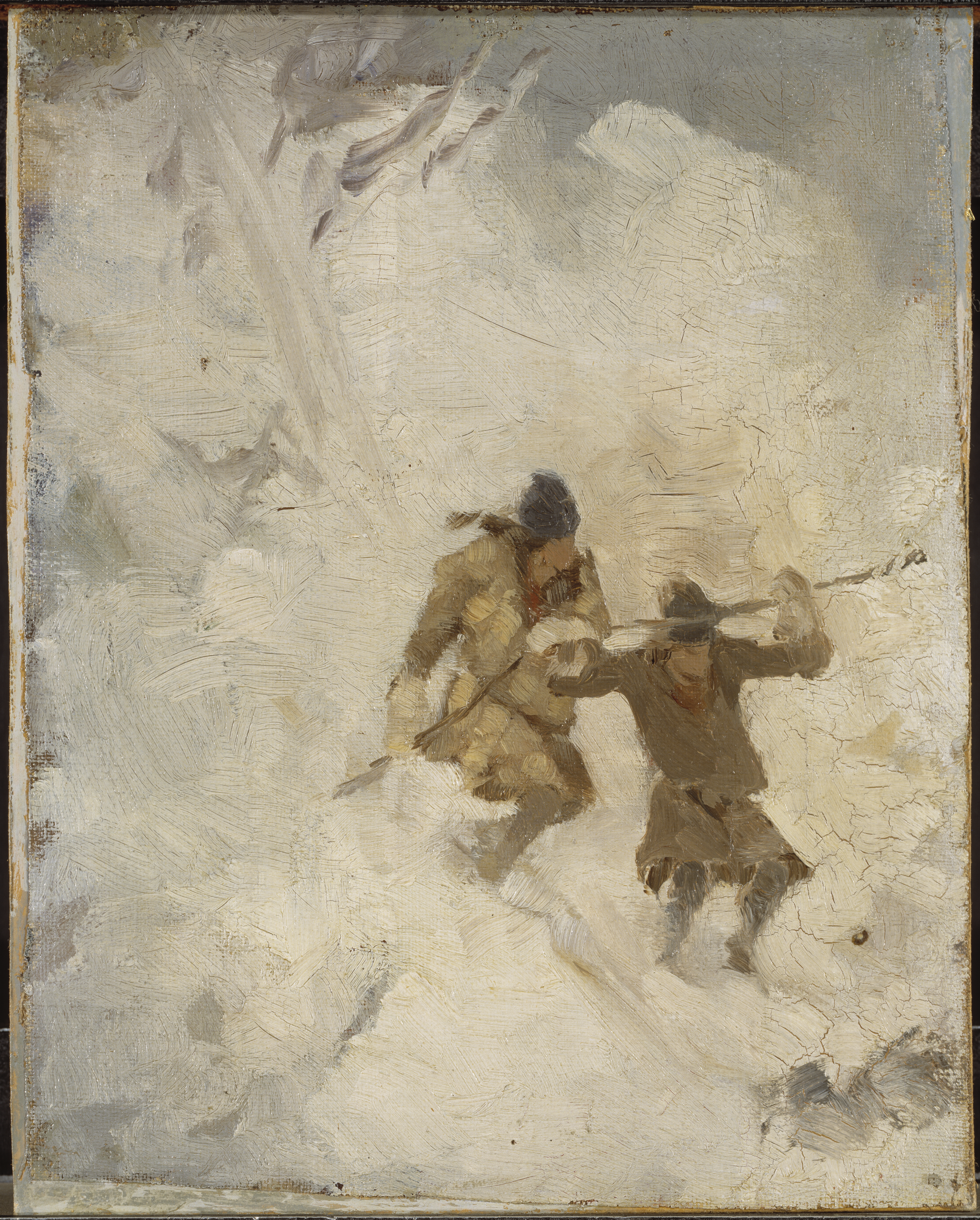
Two Skiing Sami (Nationalmuseum)

Anna Catharina Nordlander (28 October 1843 – 26 February 1879), was a Swedish painter. She is known for her portraits and her depictions of genre- nature- and folk life: she is also counted as a pioneer in the illustration of the lives of the Forest Sami (Skogssamar) of northern Sweden.

== Biography ==
Anna Nordlander was born in the vicarage at Skellefteå in Västerbotten County, Sweden to Nils Nordlander (1796–1874) and Anna Maria Gestrin. Her father was parish vicar and in 1841 among the founders of the town of Skellefteå. She studied at the Royal Swedish Academy of Arts (1866) under Jean-François Portaels in Brussels and at the Académie Julian in Paris.

Nordlander is represented in several Swedish museums including the Nationalmuseum in Stockholm. She was not particularly acknowledged until the late 20th-century. Her artistic pursuit first attracted broader attention posthumously. Nordlander died in Härnösand at 36 years old.

== Museum Anna Nordlander ==
Museum Anna Nordlander (MAN) in Skellefteå, founded in 1995, is named in her honor. The museum is an independent department within Skellefteå museum, a cultural history museum with operations in Malå, Norsjö and Skellefteå municipalities. MAN manages a number of works by Anna Nordlander in their collection. These are permanently on display at Stiftsgården Skellefteå in the building where Anna Nordlander grew up. The museum has also founded the annual Anna Nordlander Award (Anna Nordlander-priset).

== See also ==
- Family Nordlander from Bjärtrå.

== Other Sources ==
- Barbro Werkmäster (1993) Anna Nordlander och hennes samtid (Uppsala: Almqvist & Wiksell) ISBN 91-86072-18-8
