= Norrland (village) =

Coordinates: 62.9243°N 17.8894°E

Norrland is a part of Lugnvik, and formerly a village in Bjärtrå, Ångermanland, Sweden.

== History ==
Evidence suggest early settlement from the Iron Age at Norrland 4/14 with a group of four graves. At Norrland 4/6 lies a 2.25 meters high and 24 diameters large grave on a hill.

Also in adjacent to the estate lies the ruins of a medieval fortification or manor house, dated to the early 15th century with dendrochronology, which probably served as a regional military defense position and for housing military personnel. The residence of the Vogt, the regional Bailiff of Ångermanland, is believed to have been located on the same estate as the present building.
