= Daniel Nordlander =

Daniel Nordlander KmstkNO, RSO, RCXIII:sO
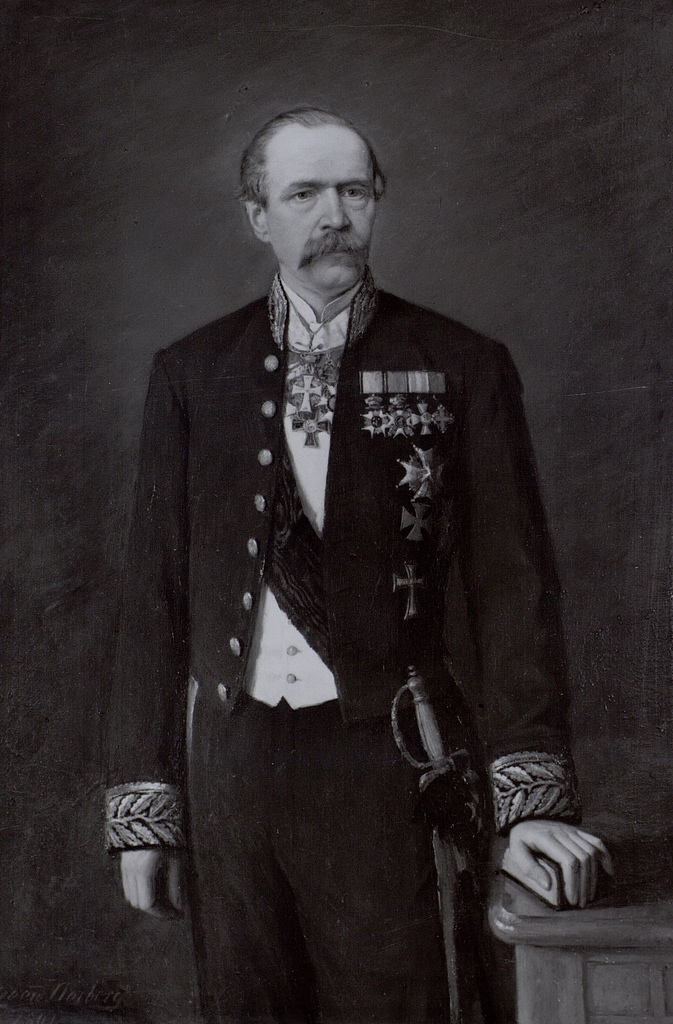
- Lieutenant Colonel Daniel Nordlander.

Member of the Swedish Parliament for Västerbotten County
- In office 1883–1885

Personal details
- Born: 3 January 1829 Uppsala, Sweden
- Died: 27 February 1890 (aged 61) Stockholm, Sweden
- Education: Uppsala University; Higher Artillery School
- Occupation: Military Officer; Adjutant; Director-general

Military service
- Allegiance: Sweden
- Branch/service: Swedish Army
- Years of service: 1849-1867
- Rank: Lieutenant Colonel

Daniel Enoch Nathanael Nordlander (3 January 1829 – 27 February 1890) was a Swedish Lieutenant Colonel of the Swedish Army, Adjutant to King Charles XV of Sweden, Director-general of Kongl. Telegrafverket, and Member of Parliament of the Riksdag of Sweden of the First Chamber for the Västerbotten County (1883-1885).

== Biography ==
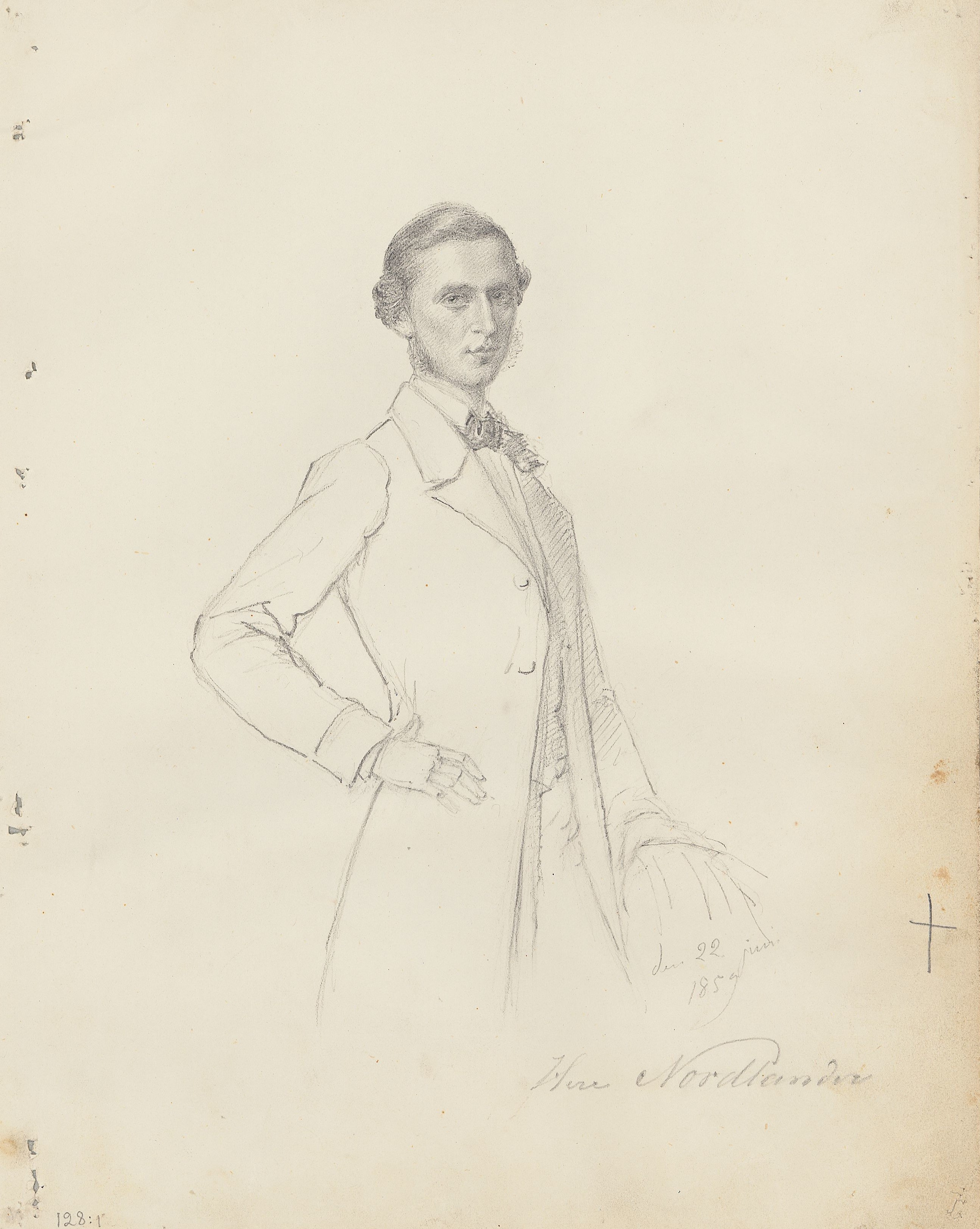
Daniel Nordlander (1859) in portrait by Maria Röhl (1801-1875).

Daniel Nordlander was born on 3 January 1829 in Uppsala, Sweden, as the son of the vicar and Member of Parliament Nils Nordlander, founder of Skellefteå, and Anna Maria Gestrin. He studied at Härnösand secondary school and was enrolled as a student at Uppsala University on 7 December 1846.

In the military, he was appointed Furir in 1849, Second Lieutenant on 9 July 1850 at the Regiment of Nerike, and Lieutenant on 2 November 1855 after studies at the Higher Artillery School, a predecessor of the Swedish Defence University. In the Swedish Army, he was appointed Captain on 7 March 1862, Major on 15 February 1867, and Lieutenant Colonel on 12 April 1872.

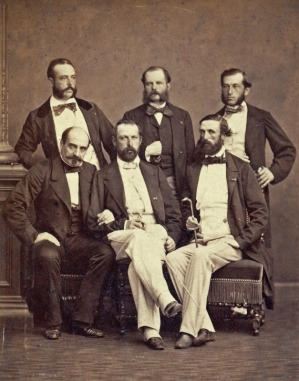
Adjutant Daniel Nordlander (upper left), with Adjutant Fritz von Dardel, Ordonnance Officer Ferdinand-Alphonse Hamelin, General Henri-Pierre Castelnau, King Charles XV of Sweden and Prince Oscar, future King Oscar II of Sweden, at the International Exposition (1867) in Paris, France.

Nordlander served as acting General Staff Officer at the Ministry of Defence in 1855, ordinary General Staff Officer 18 April 1856. He then served as Courier Officer on 5 March 1861 and then Adjutant on 28 January 1864 to King Charles XV of Sweden. He was appointed Manager at the Ministry of Defence 1867–1872.

Thereafter, he was appointed Intendant at Televerket, head of the Northern Telegraph District, and then Director-general of Televerket in 1874.

Daniel Nordlander served as Member of Parliament for the First Chamber of the Riksdag of Sweden for the Västerbotten County (1883-1885).

In addition, he was also a member of the Swedish Order of Freemasons.

Nordlander was elected as member of the Royal Swedish Academy of War Sciences in 1871.

== Distinctions ==
=== National orders ===
- Sweden: Commander Grand Cross of the Order of the Polar Star (30 November 1889) (Knight 30 November 1878)
- Sweden: Knight of the Order of the Sword (28 January 1871)
- Sweden: Knight of the Order of Charles XIII (28 January 1881)

=== Foreign orders ===
- France: Chevalier of the Legion of Honour (1867)
- Kingdom of Italy: Knight of the Order of Saints Maurice and Lazarus (1861)
- Denmark: Commander 1st Class of the Order of the Dannebrog (1885) (Knight 1862)
- Norway: Knight of the Order of Saint Olav (1862)
- Prussia: Knight of the Order of the Red Eagle (1867)
- Luxembourg: Knight of the Order of the Oak Crown (1867)
- Russian Empire: Knight Grand Cordon 2nd Class of the Order of Saint Stanislaus (1879)

== See also ==
- Nordlander
