= Brita Nordlander =

Swedish politician

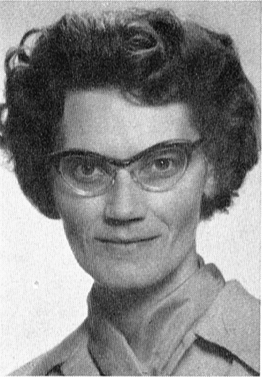

Brita Nordlander (1921–2009) was a Swedish teacher and politician, serving as President of the Municipal council of Uppsala, representing the Swedish People's Party, the predecessor of the Liberals.

Besides Brita Nordlander's profession as a teacher, she was a recurring contributor to various newspapers and magazines, including perspectives on literature.

Along with her husband Dr. Nils Brage Nordlander, she was also active in the establishment of the Museum of Medical History in Uppsala.

== Distinctions ==
- Brita Nordlander meeting premise inside the City Hall of Uppsala
