= March Unrest =

1848 riots in Stockholm, Sweden

- Part of Revolutions of 1848
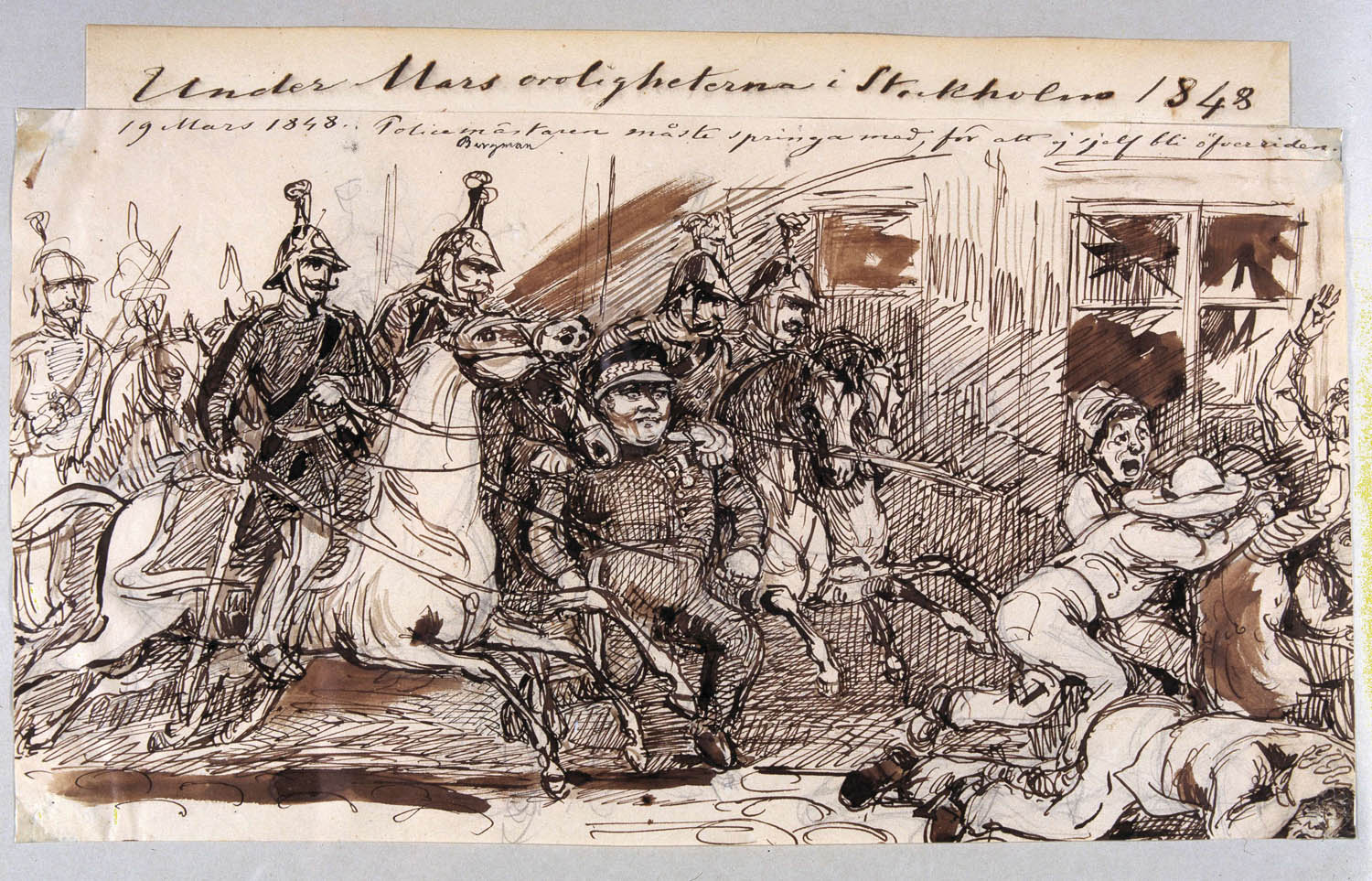
- Depiction of the confrontation between republicans and police on 19 March 1848 by Fritz von Dardel
Date	18–19 March 1848
Location	Sweden
Result	Rebellion crushed

Belligerents
Swedish police; Swedish military	Armed protesters

Casualties and losses
Unknown, +100 injured	18

The March Unrest (Swedish: Marsoroligheterna [ˈmâʂːˌuːruːlɪɡˌheːtɛɳa]), sometimes called the battle for Stockholm, was a brief series of riots which occurred in the Swedish capital Stockholm during the Revolutions of 1848.

== History ==
On 2 March 1848, news of the French Revolution of 1848 reached Stockholm. On the morning of 18 March, the police encountered proclamations all over the capital defying the government and demanding reforms, among them elective and suffrage reform. That afternoon, a banquet was arranged at the luxury Hotel de la Croix. A mob gathered on the square outside, Brunkebergstorg, and threatened to enter the building. The mob was crushed by the police and some were arrested, though they defended themselves by throwing stones.

On the evening, a crowd gathered between the Royal Palace and the Storkyrkan. King Oscar I of Sweden, who was attending a performance by Jenny Lind at the Royal Swedish Opera, met the protesters at Storkyrkobrinken, listened to their complaints and ordered the release of the arrested, which dissolved the crowd.

Another crowd formed later the same day, however, which threw stones through windows at Gustav Adolfs torg, Drottninggatan and Blasieholmen, among them at the windows of Arch Bishop Wingård.

On 19 March, mobs gathered again and shops were plundered. When a crowd on Storkyrkobrinken refused to dissolve, the monarch called out the militia. Shots were fired, leading to 18 casualties among the protesters. At Norra Smedjegatan, the military stormed a barricade. Among the wealthy merchant class, private militias were formed to keep the peace.

The following day was calm. On 21 March, reinforcements from the army arrived to the capital to be at hand in case of further riots, but none occurred.
