= Fritz von Dardel =

Swedish artist

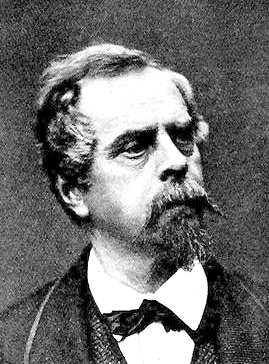

Personal details
- Born: 24 March 1817 Neuchâtel, Switzerland
- Died: 27 May 1901 (aged 84) Stockholm, Sweden
- Resting place: Norra begravningsplatsen
- Spouse: Augusta Silfverschiöld
- Children: Georges Albert von Dardel
- Relatives: Carlo von Dardel (grandchild)
- Occupation: Painter; Diplomat; Comics artist Illustrator

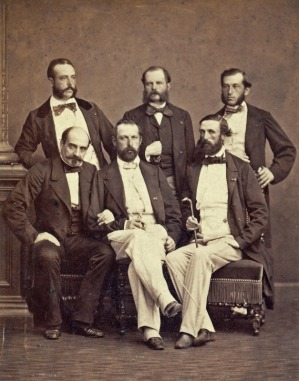
Adjutant Daniel Nordlander (upper left), with Adjutant Fritz von Dardel, Ordonnance Officer Ferdinand-Alphonse Hamelin, General Henri-Pierre Castelnau, King Charles XV of Sweden and Prince Oscar, future King Oscar II of Sweden, at the International Exposition (1867) in Paris, France.

Fritz Ludvig von Dardel (24 March 1817 – 27 May 1901) was a Swedish diarist, illustrator and early comics artist. He was a courtier, and is known for his diary and illustrations depicting the life of the Swedish court in the mid-19th century.

== Biography ==
Fritz von Dardel was born in Neuchâtel to the Swiss noble Georges-Alexandre von Dardel, who was inducted into the Swedish nobility in 1810, and the Swedish noble Hedvig Sofia Charlotta Amalia Lewenhaupt, and married the Swedish noble Augusta Silfverschiöld. He became adjutant to the Crown Prince, later King Charles XV of Sweden, in 1850.

He was a personal friend of Charles XV aside from having several court offices, and both professionally and privately he often attended court during the reign of Charles, and his published diary is a valuable description of the Swedish court and its personages in the mid-19th century.

von Dardel was military attaché in Paris from 1852 to 1862 and became chamberlain of Charles XV's cabinet in 1864. He was also chairman of the Nationalmuseum's board from 1867 to 1892.

At several art exhibitions in Europe (1867, 1871, 1873 and 1878) as well as in Philadelphia (1876), von Dardel was the juryman, and he himself had studied studies at Léon Cogniets and E. Lami's studios in Paris.

Fritz von Dardel is known for his drawings and diary depicting the life at the contemporary Swedish royal court, especially during the reign of Charles XV.

He became a member of the Royal Swedish Academy of Arts in 1861.

== Comics ==
Many of von Dardel's caricatures were made in series in order to tell a (comic) story together with short accompanying texts. They were early examples of cartoon series, probably inspired by his Swiss compatriot Rodolphe Töpffer. His works are represented in the Stockholm City Museum, Kalmar Art Museum, and Nationalmuseum.

== Gallery ==
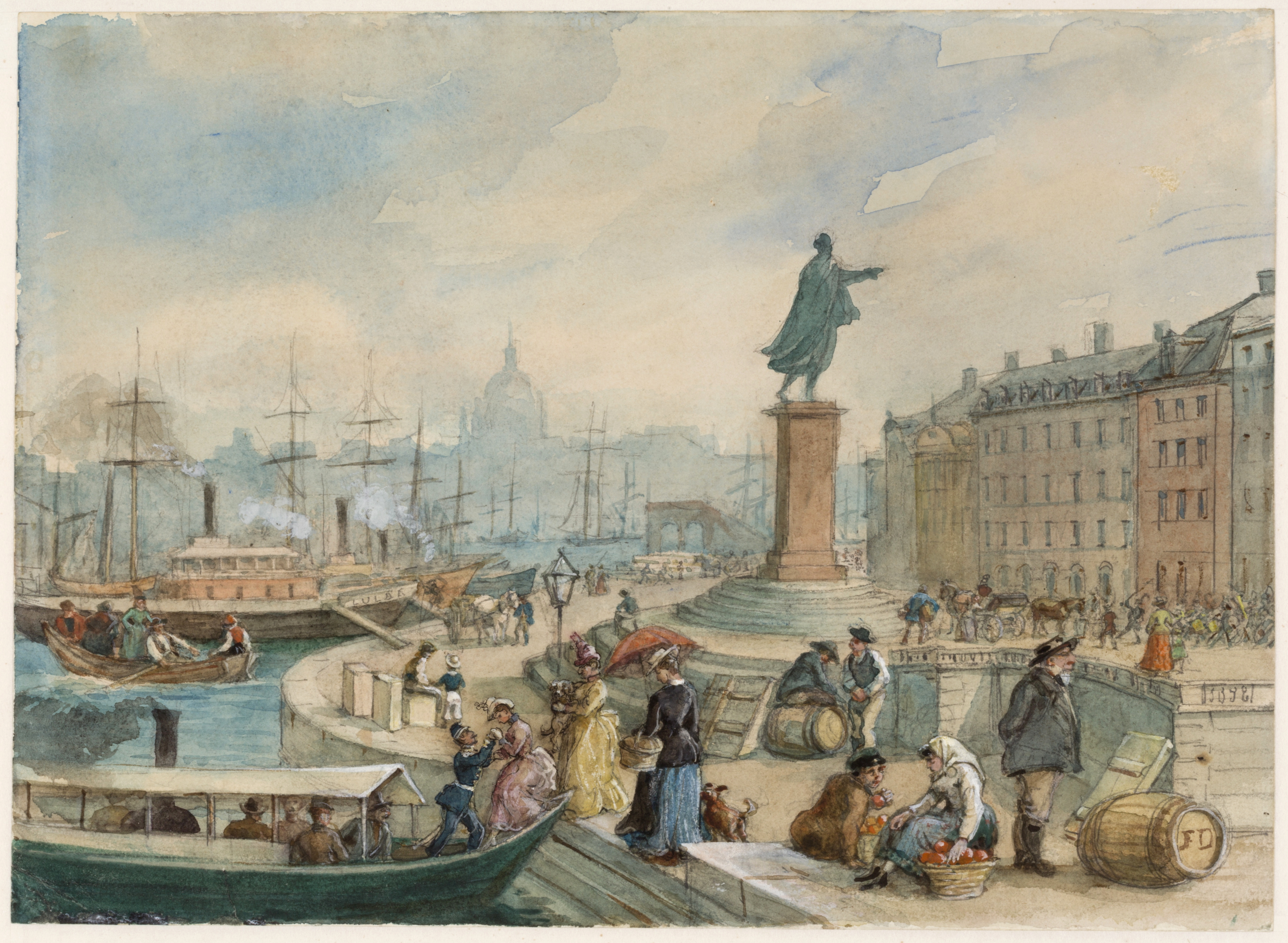
Johan Tobias Sergels statue over Gustav III on Skeppsbron in Stockholm (1860)

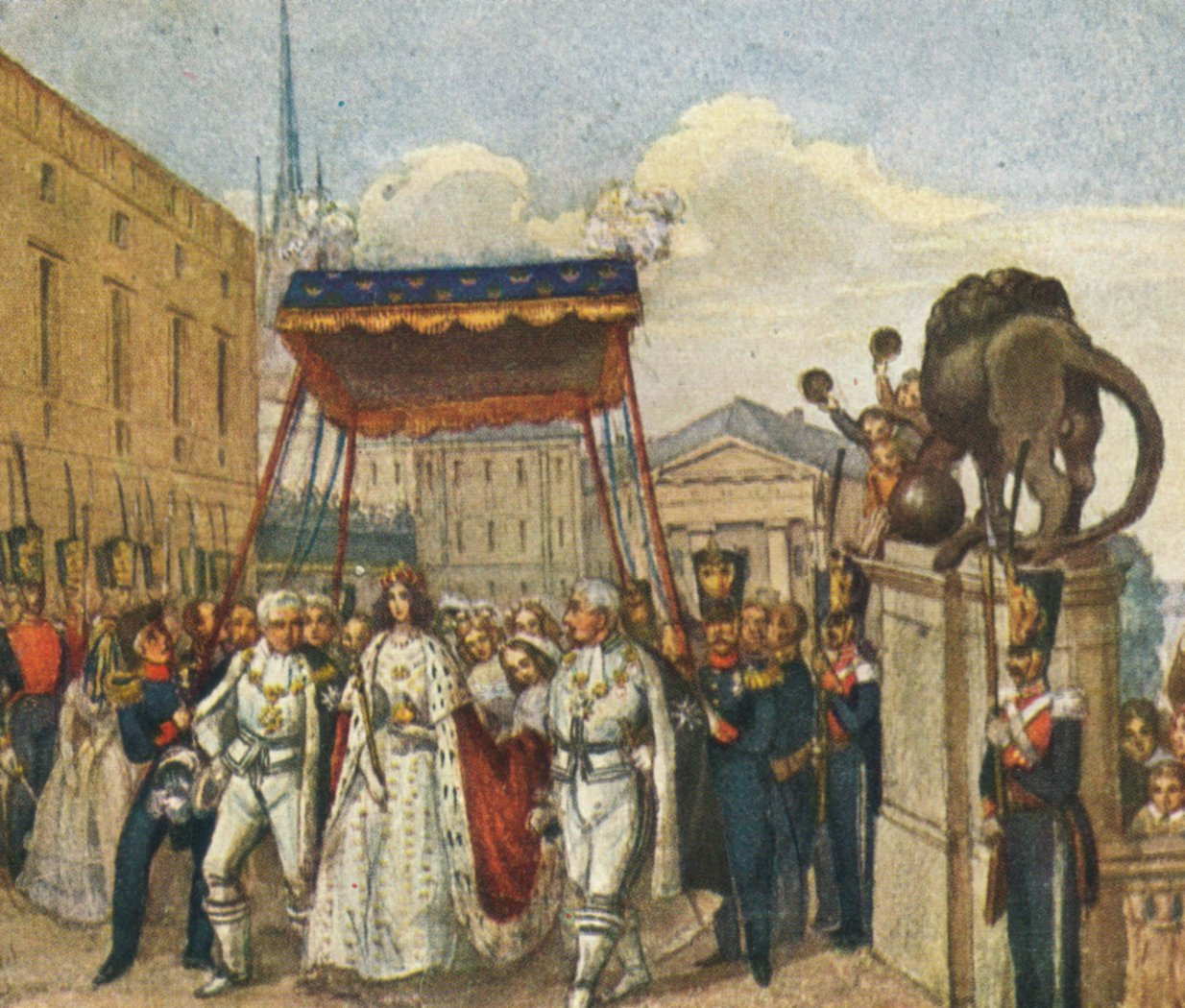
The coronation of Queen Josephine in 1844.

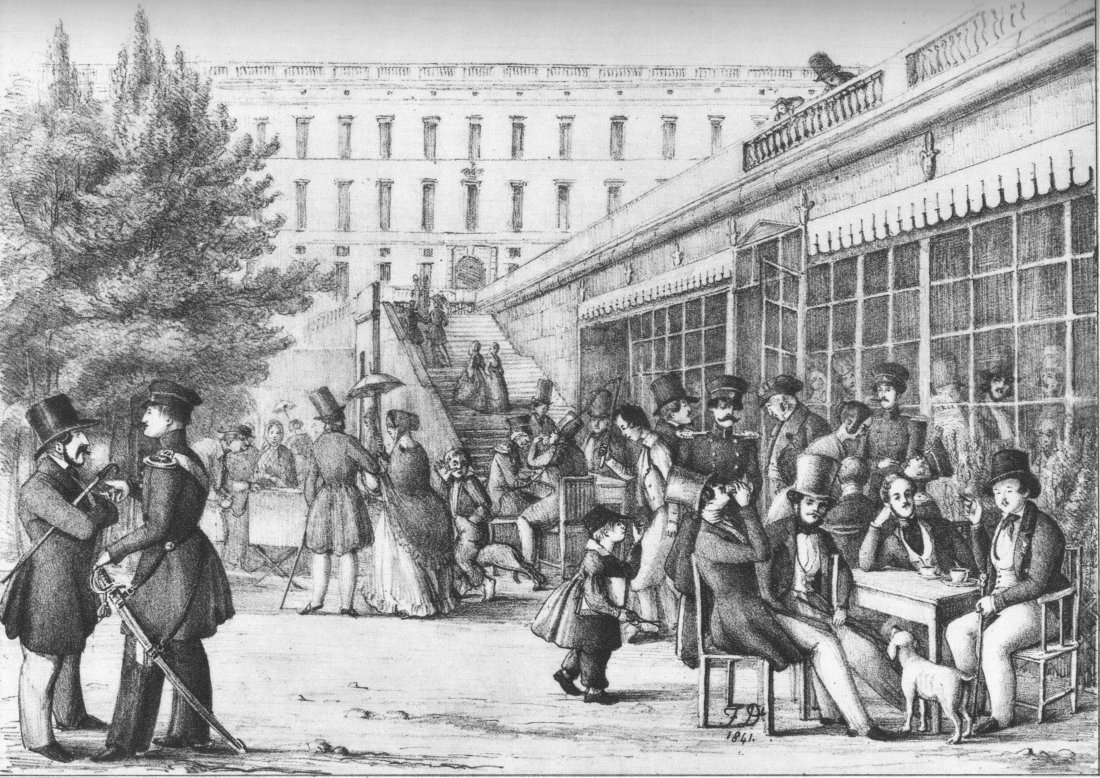
Strömparterren 1841.

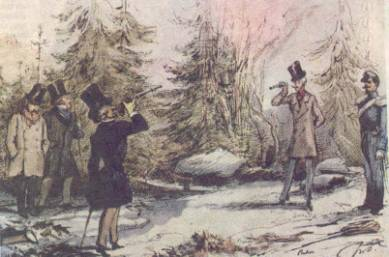
The duel between Mr. Baker and Soto Maior 1857.

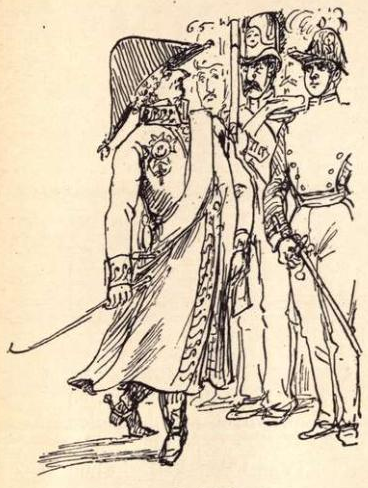
Charles XIV John inspects his troops.

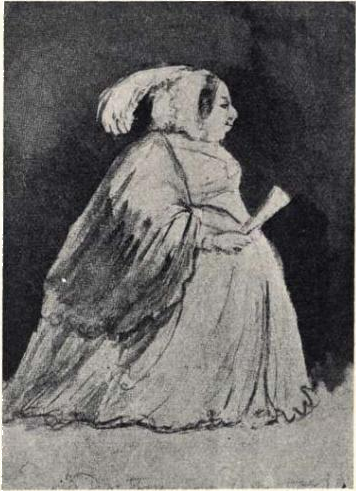
Caricature of Queen Mother Désirée Clary.

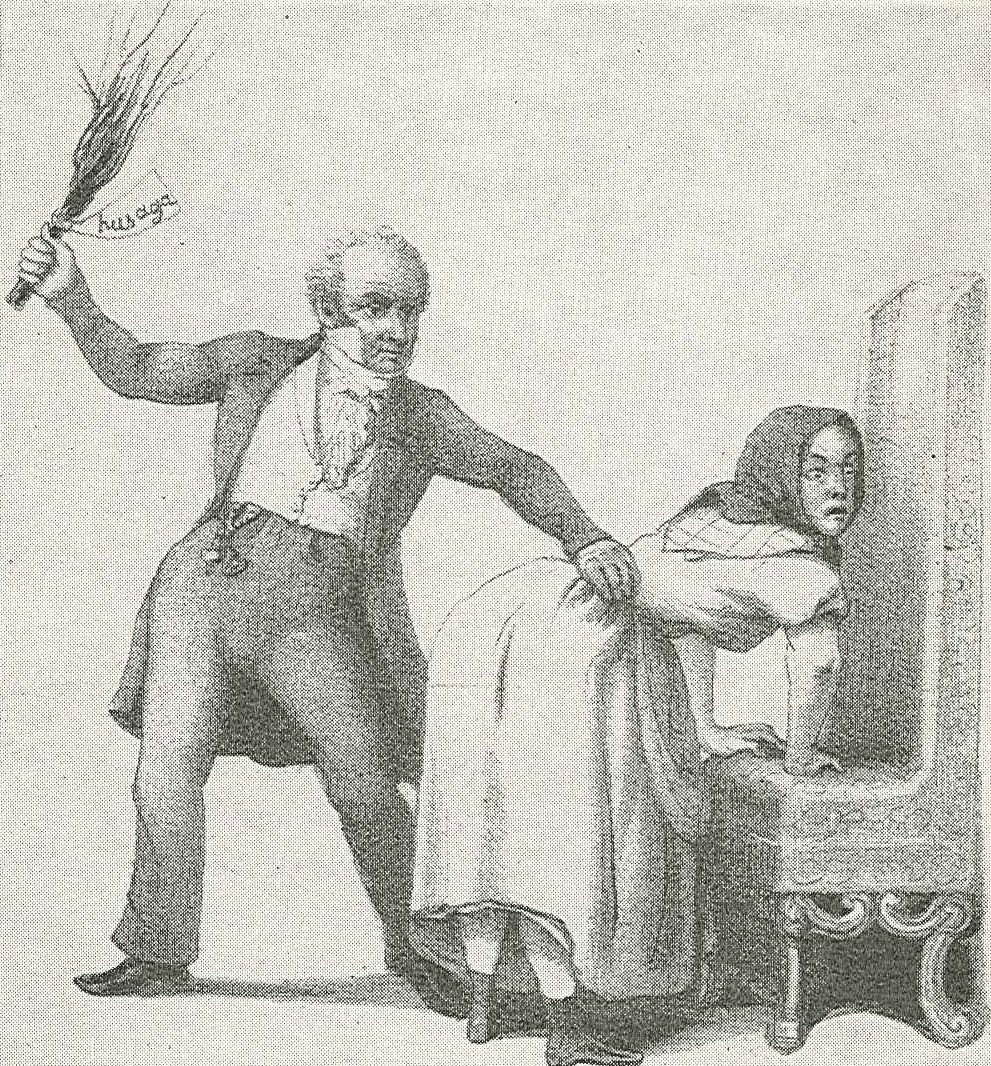
"Corporal punishment in the home".

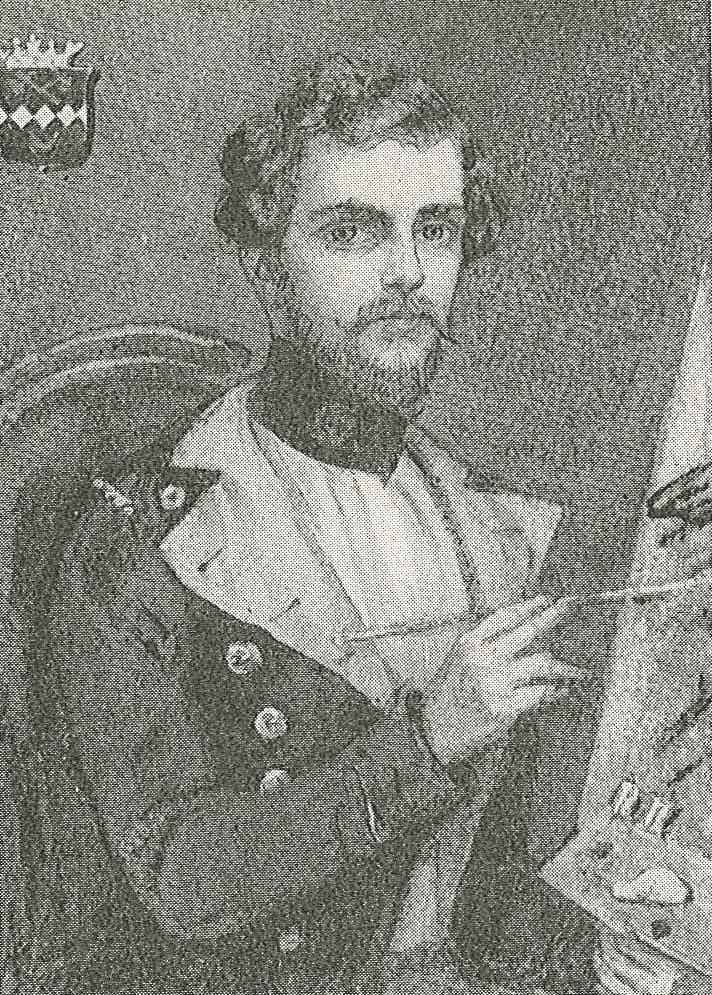
Self-portrait in younger days.

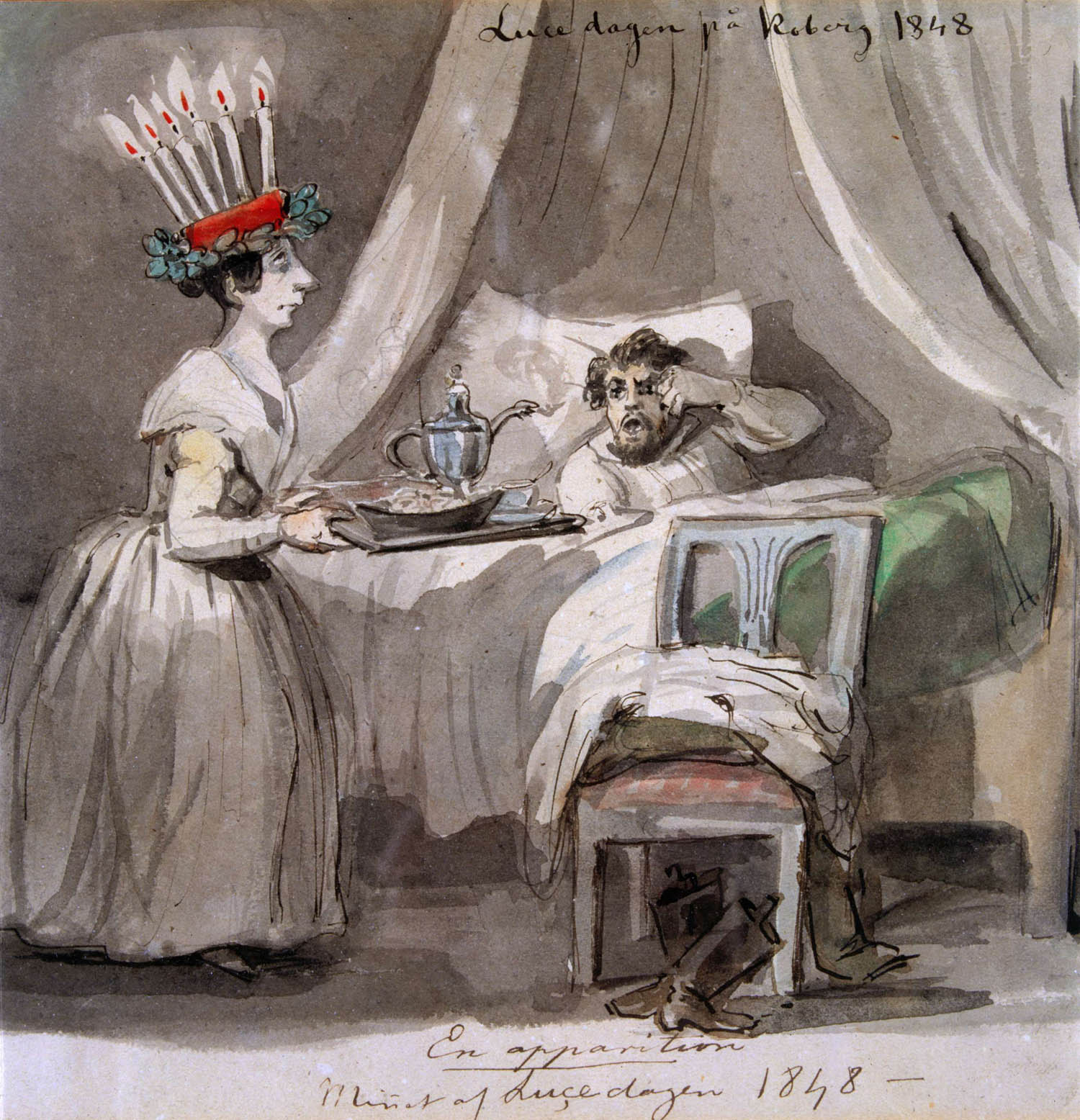
Saint Lucy's Day celebrations at Koberg Castle in Västergötland 1848. Watercolor

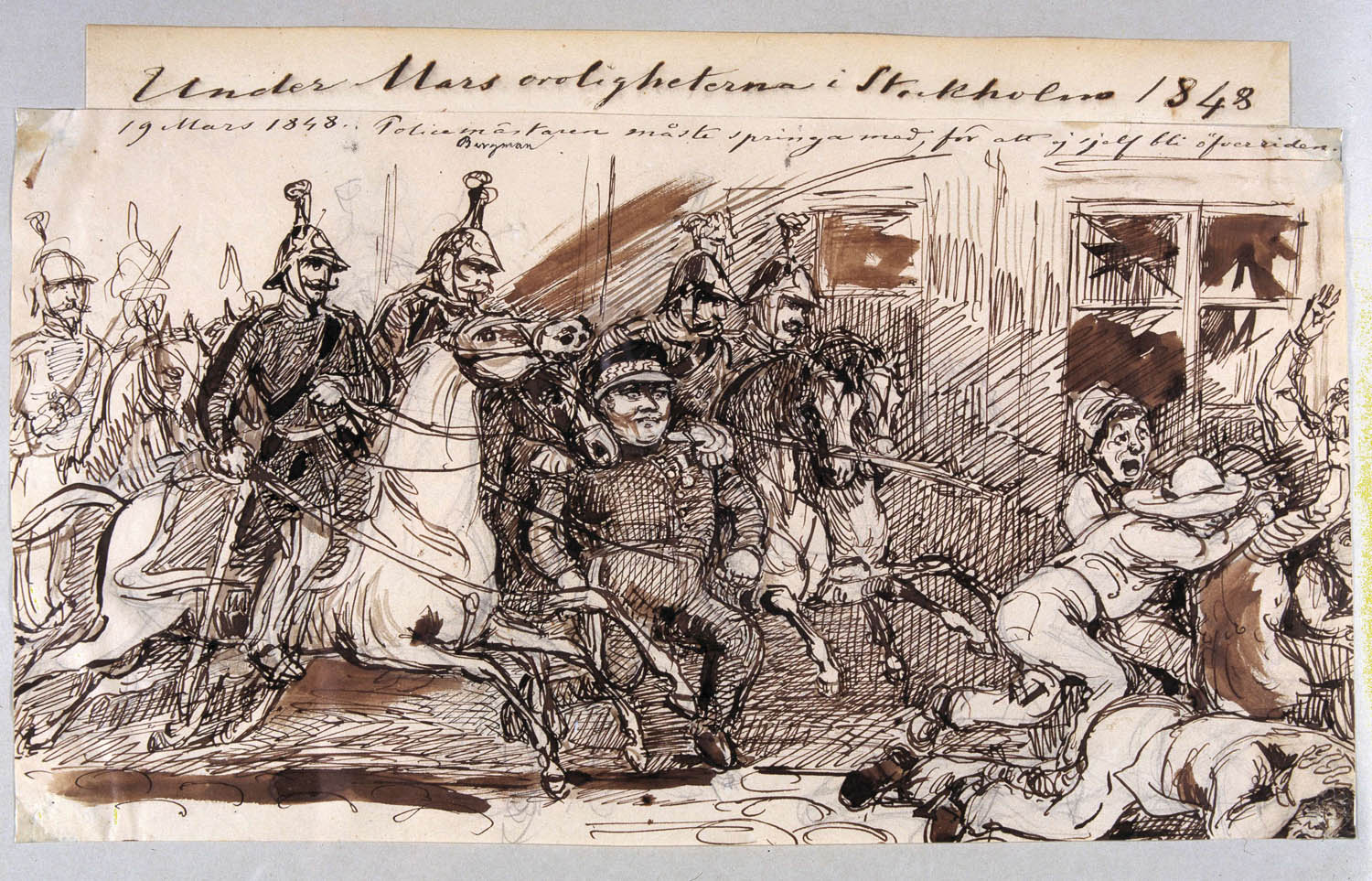
March Unrest in Stockholm 1848

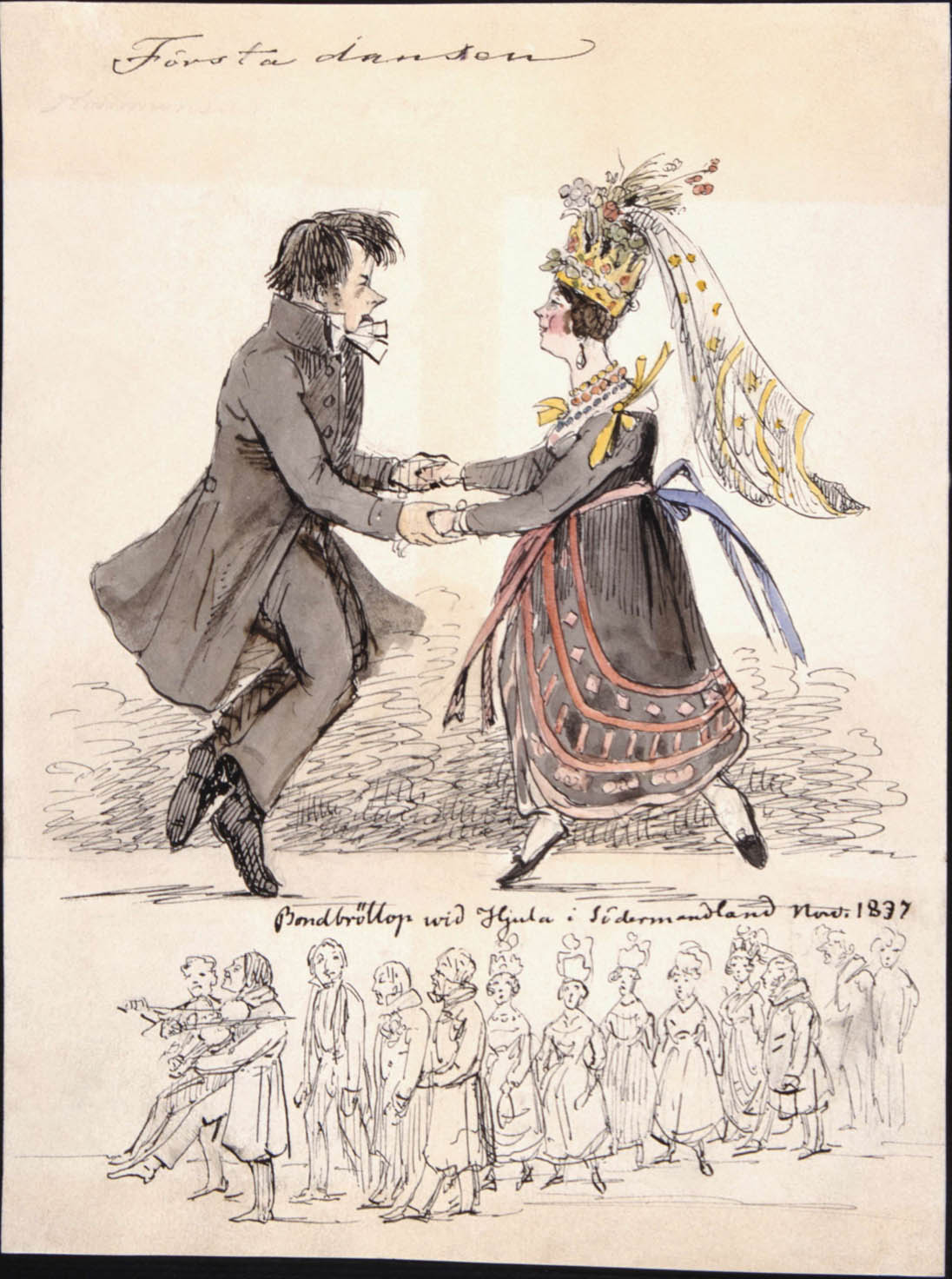
First dance. Farmers' wedding at Hjula in Södermanland 1837

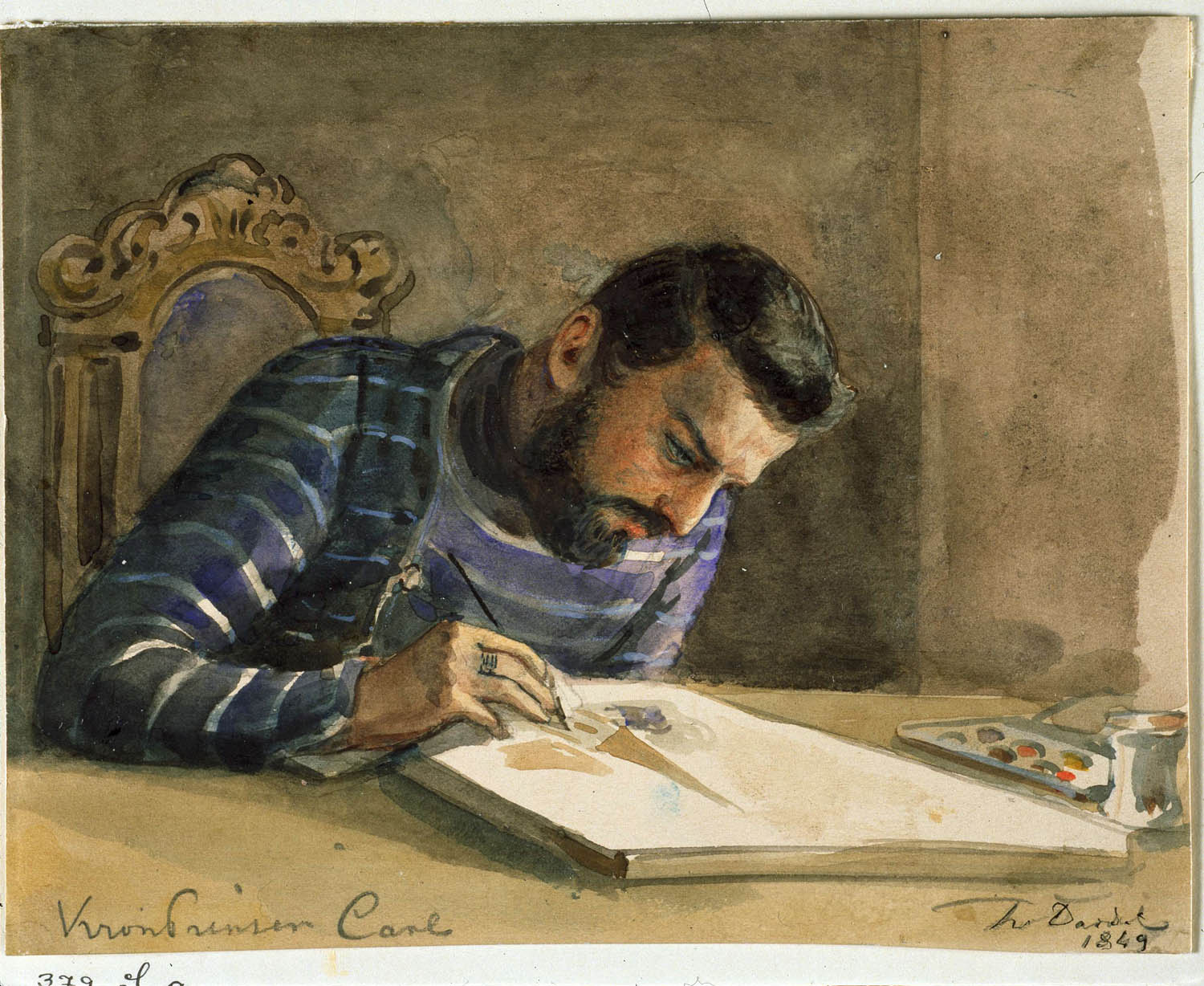
Crown Prince Charles. Watercolor 1849

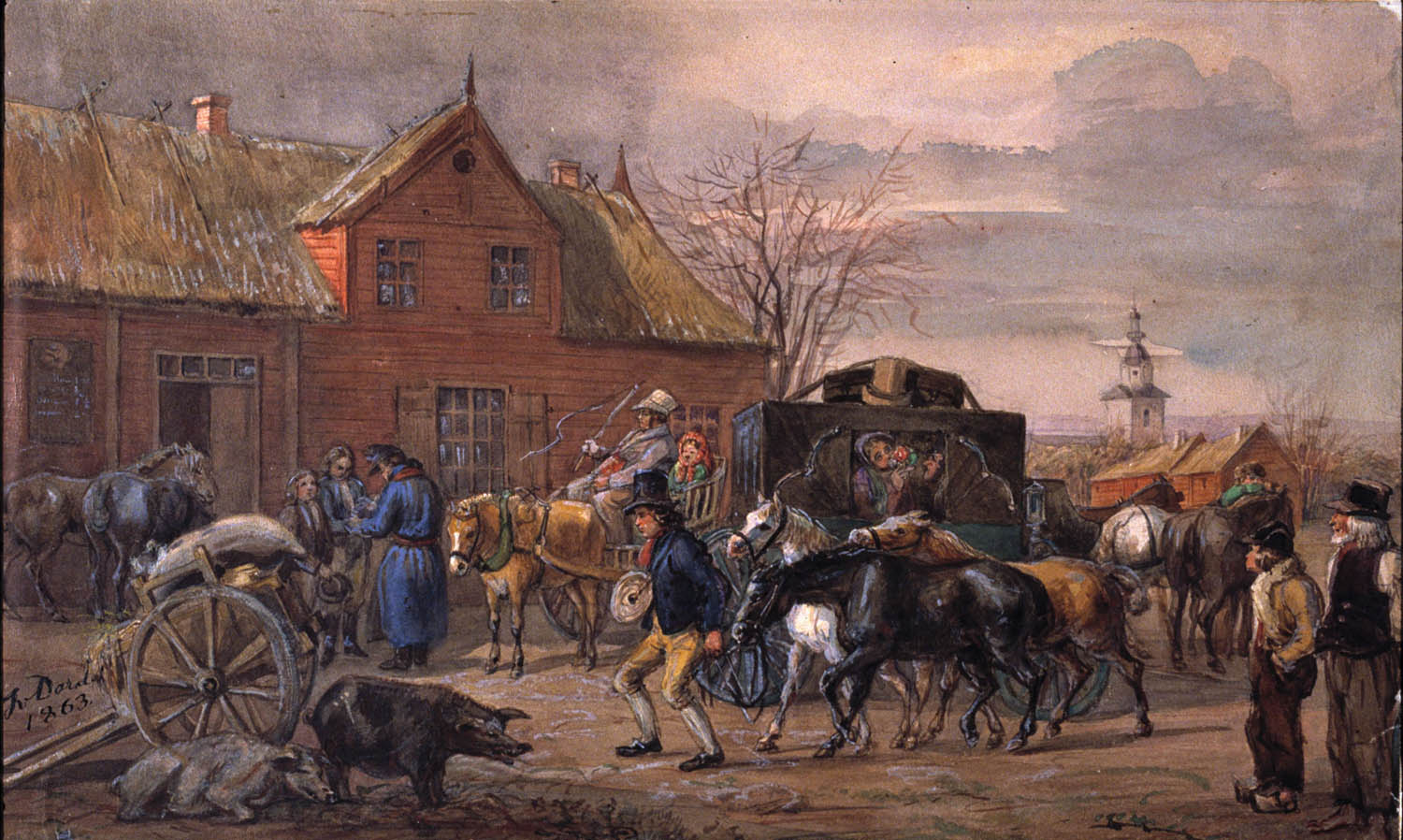
Inn in Halland, 1863

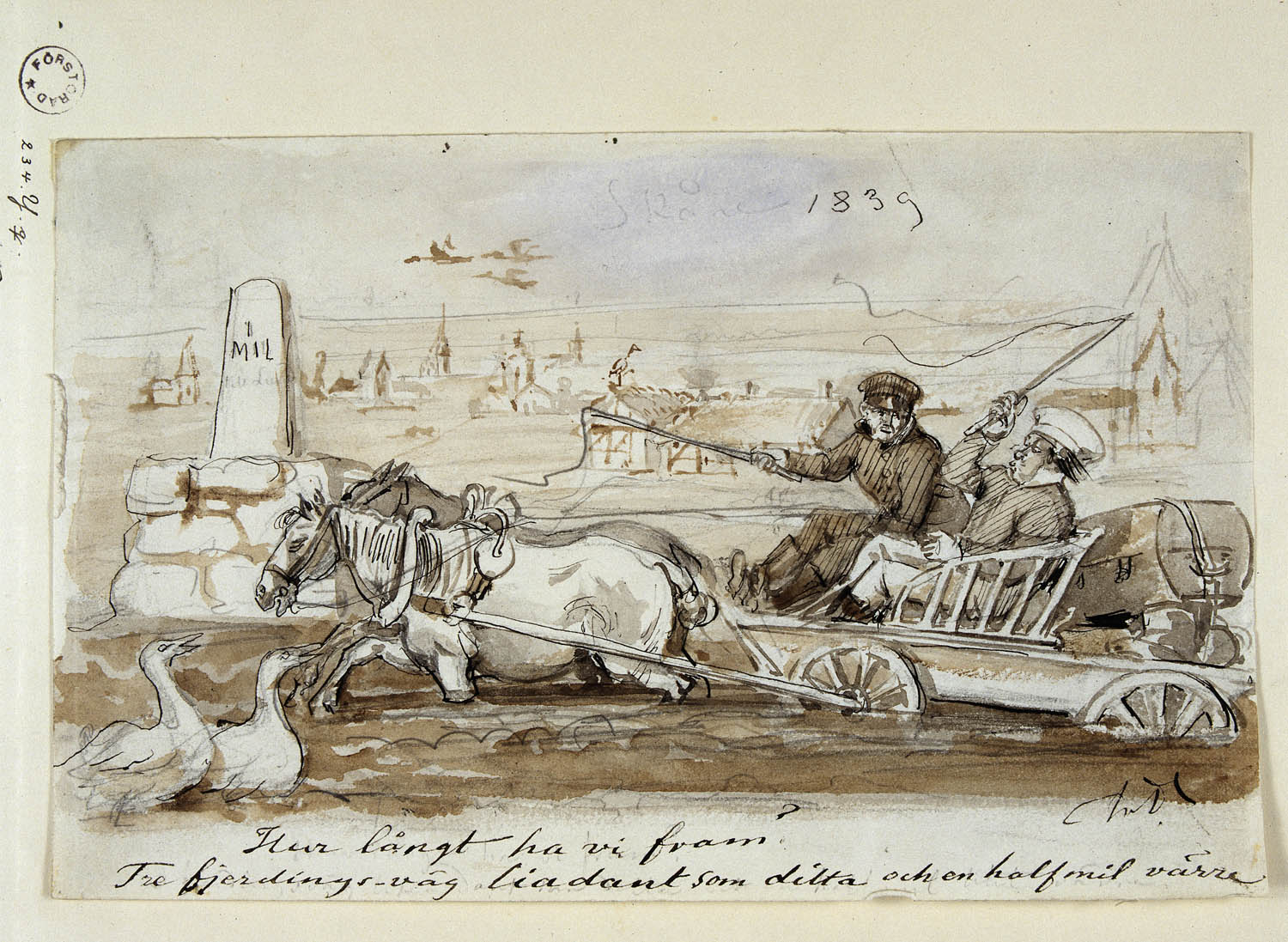
"Hur långt ha vi fram?" 1839

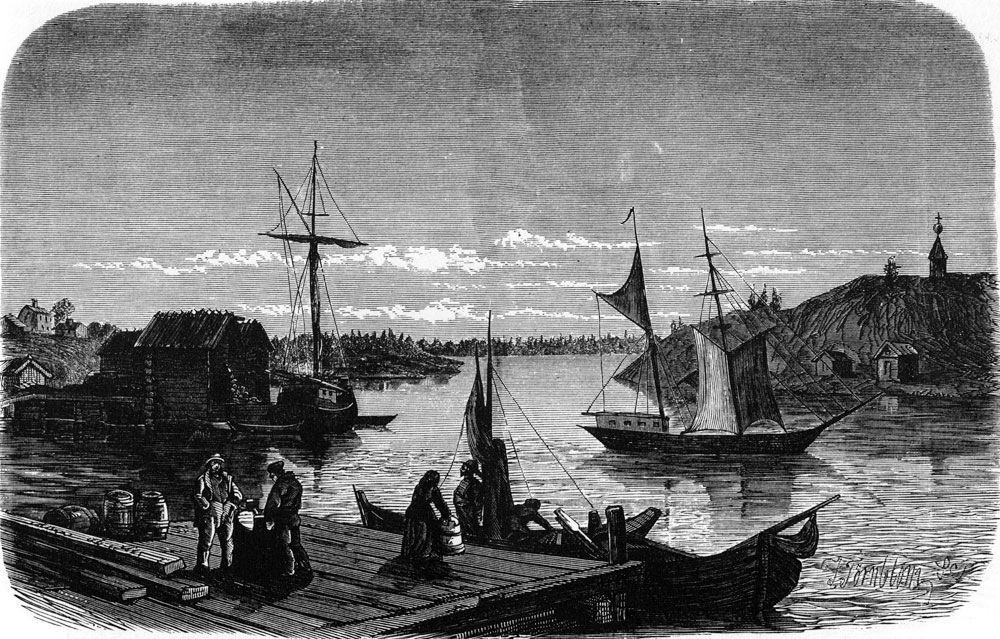
The harbor of Ratan in the 1870s. Drawing in Ny Illustrerad Tidning

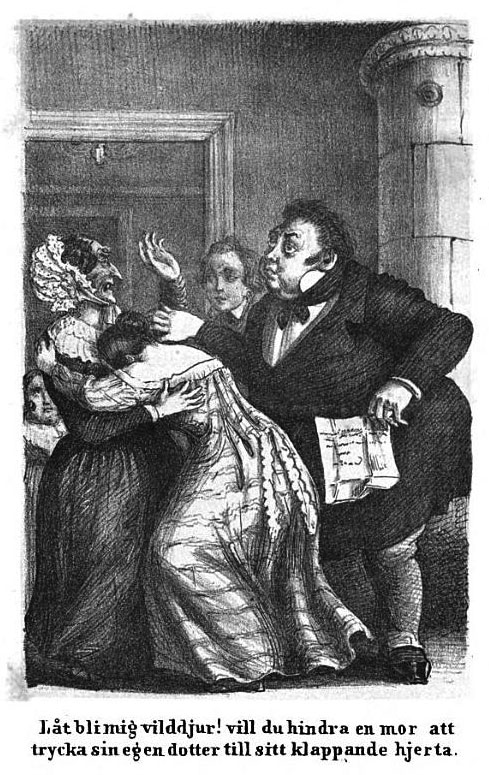
"Låt bli mig vilddjur!" Book illustration from Berättelser af Onkel Adam by Carl Anton Wetterbergh 1854.

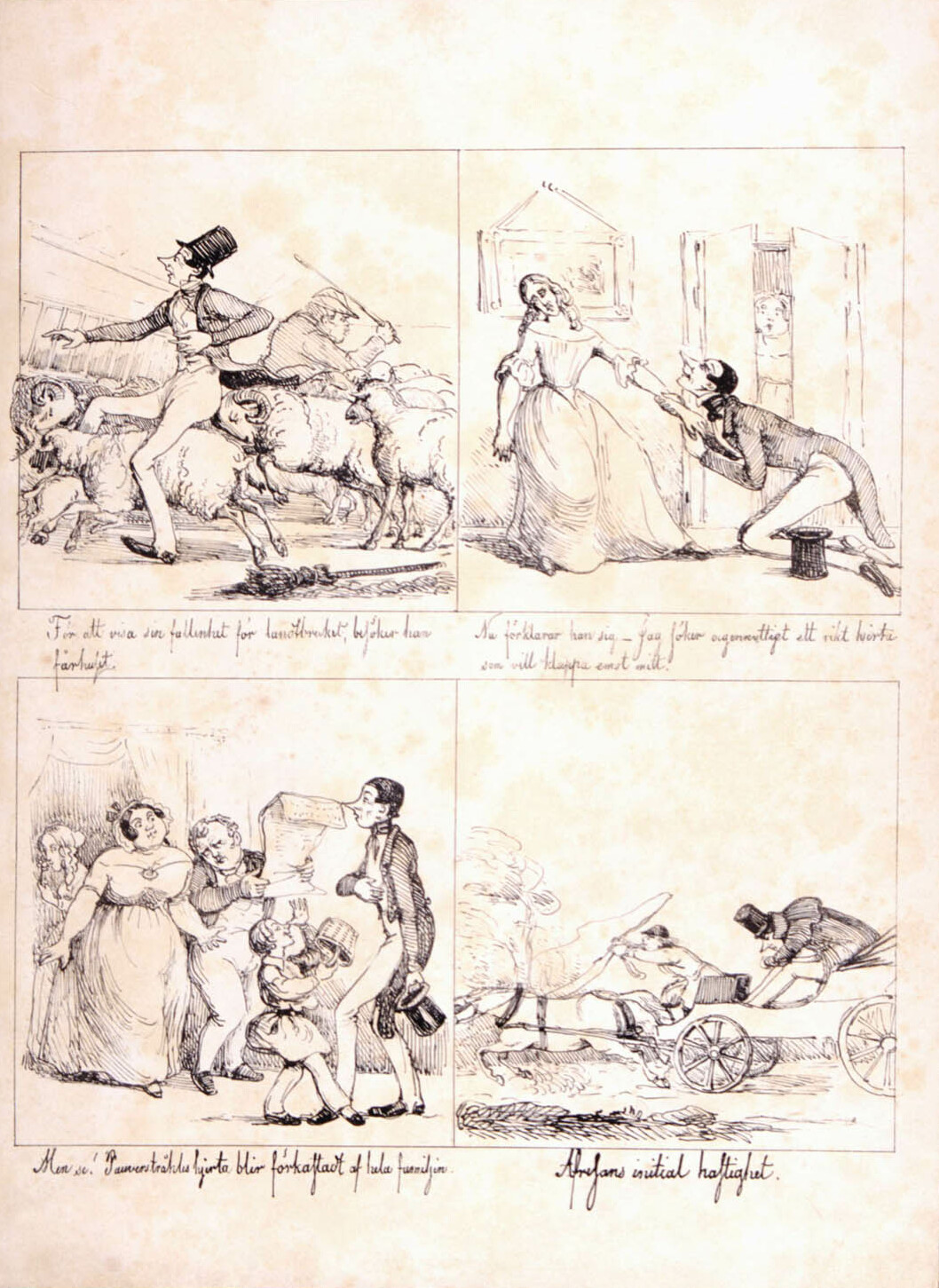
"Ett frieri. Pauverstråhles hjerta blir förkastadt af hela familjen." Example of early comics by von Dardel.

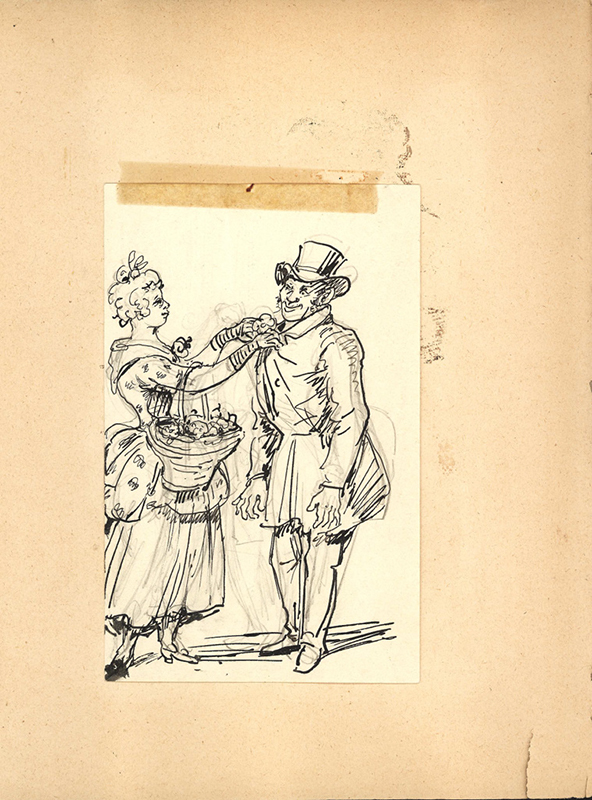
A woman fastens a flower on the lapel of a gentleman

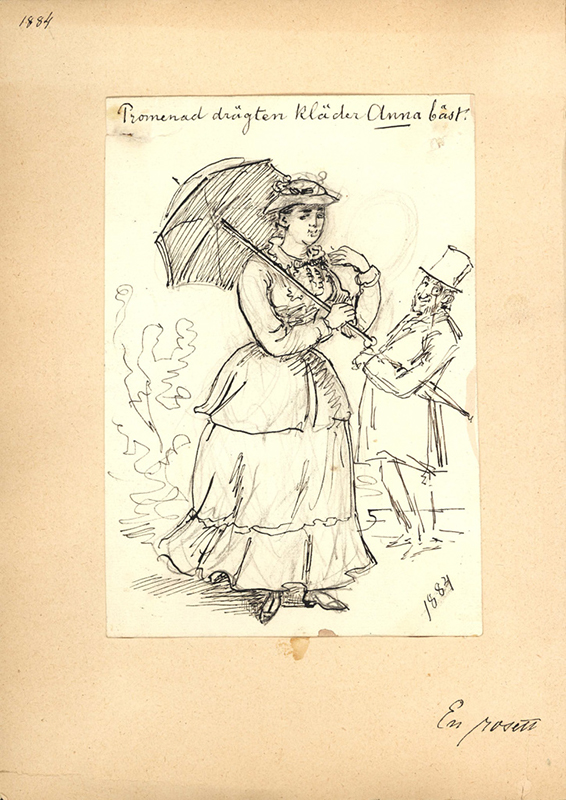
"Promenad drägten kläder Anna bäst"

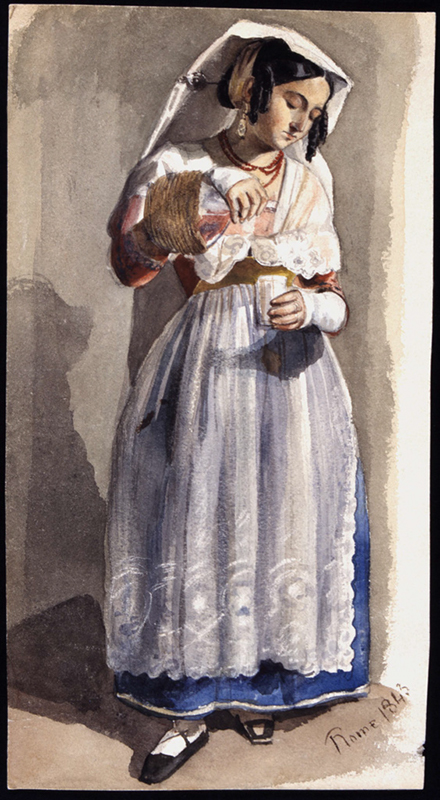
"Rome 1843. Woman in folk costume." Watercolor 1843

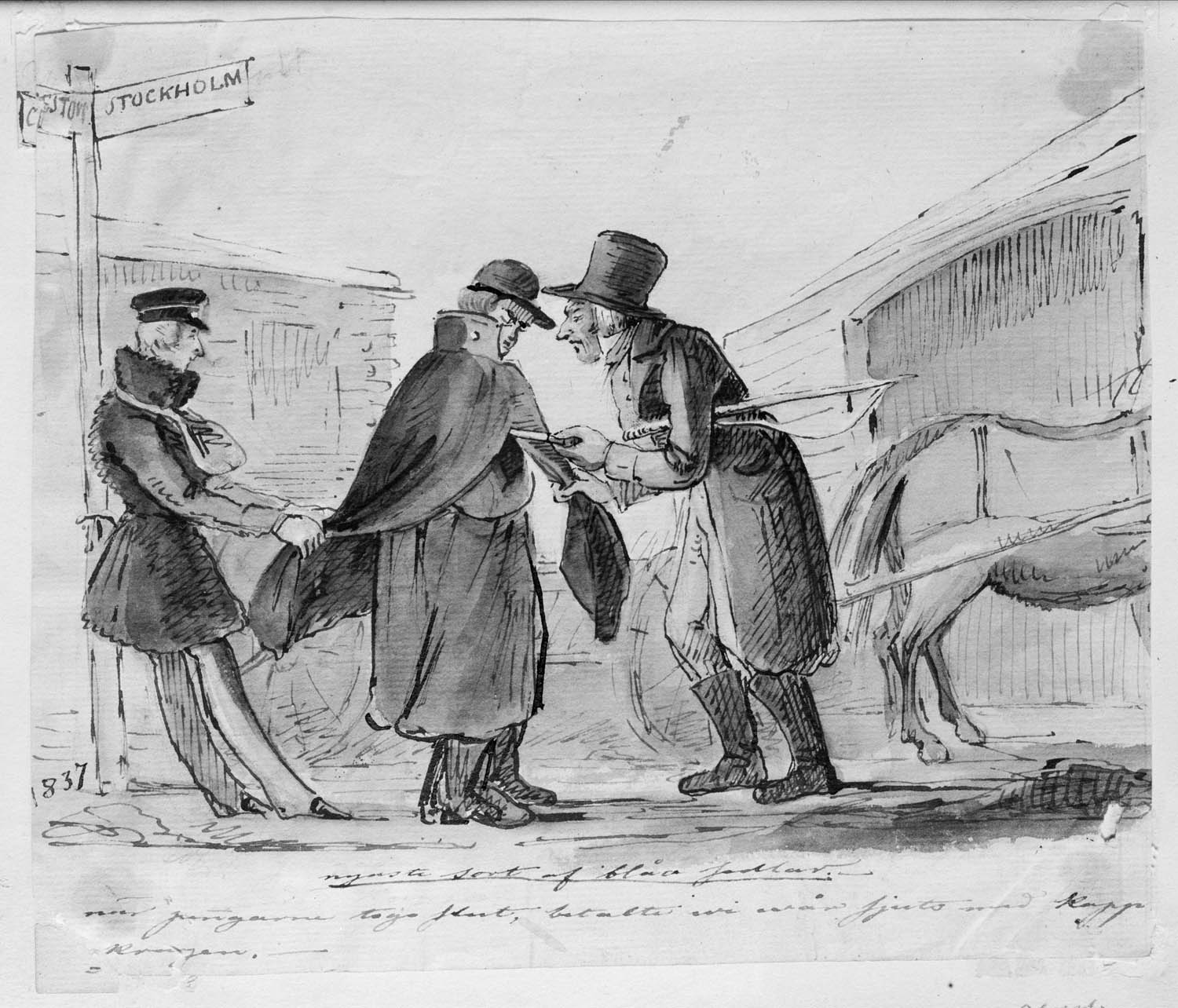
"När pengarna togo slut, betalte vi vår skjuts med kappkragen"

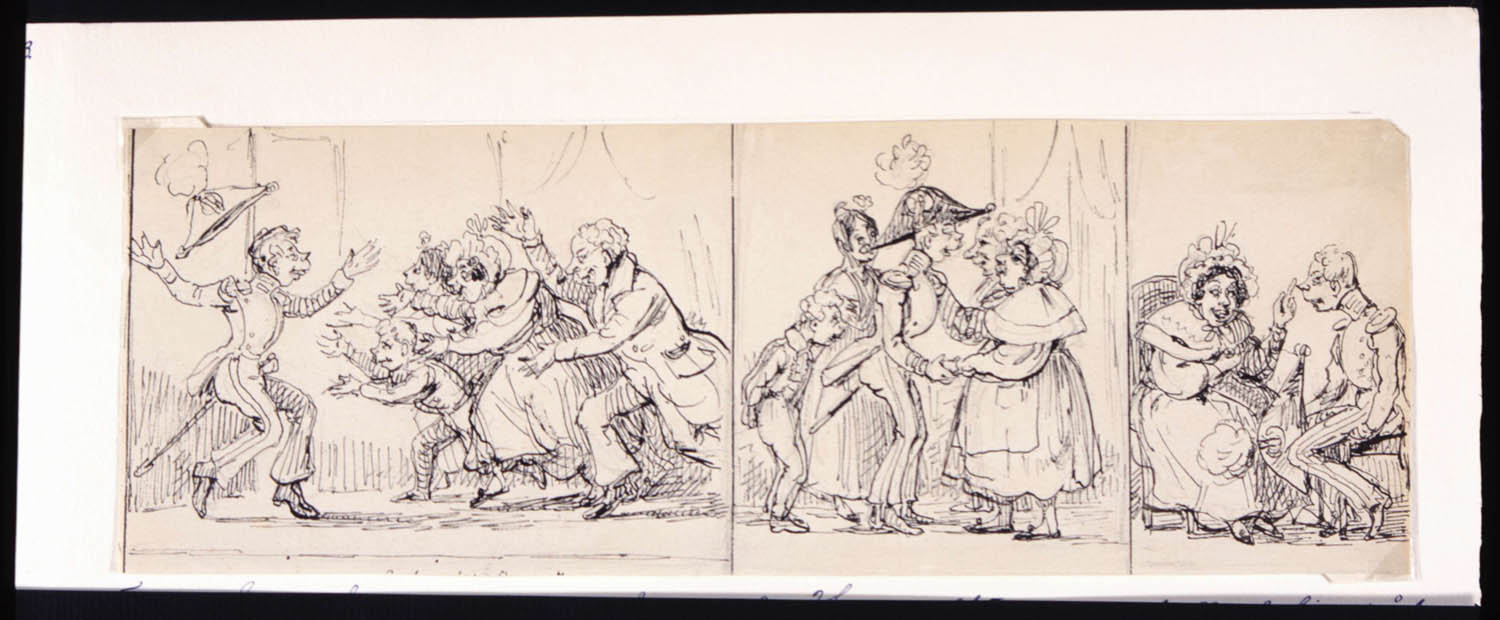
"Unge Sparf kommer hem till familjen, som färdig officer." Ink 1840

== Bibliography ==
- Teckningar ur dagens händelser : serie A - F.. Sthlm & Göteborg. 1848-1852.
- Ett besök i Malmö läger. Malmö. 1848.
- Gubben med skåpet : scener ur svenska hvardagslifvet. [Stockholm]. 1849.
- Familjen Tutings lustresa till Bomarsund. [Stockholm]. 1853.
- En familj från landet på besök i hufvudstaden. [Stockholm]. 1856.
- Svenska och norska [arméen] armeerna samt flottorna i [dess] deras nuvarande uniformering. Stockholm. 1861-1863.
- Ett besök i Nationalmuseum. Aftryck ur Post- och inrikes tidningar. Stockholm. 1865.
- International Exhibition of 1871 (1872). Internationela utställningen i London 1871. 1, Konst och konst-industri : redogörelse. Stockholm: Norstedt.
- Dagblads-annonser. Stockholm. 1875.
- Marionetter : pennritningar. [Stockholm]. 1876.
- Åtgärder vidtagna i några af Europas länder för konstindustriens befrämjande : reseberättelse. Stockholm: Centraltryckeriet. 1878.
- Minnen. Stockholm: Norstedt. 1911-1913.
  - Del 1, 1833-1861. 1911.
  - Del 2, 1863-1865. 1912.
  - Del 3, 1866-1870. 1912.
  - Del 4, 1871-1872; Jämte personregister till delarna 1-4. 1913.
- Dagboksanteckningar. Stockholm: Norstedt. 1916-1920.
  - [1], 1873-1876. 1916.
  - [2], 1877-1880. 1918.
  - [3], 1881-1885. 1920.
- Minnen från senare år, 1888-1898. Stockholm: Norstedt. 1931.
- Ur Fritz von Dardels album : bilder ur sällskaps- och militärlifvet från adertonhundratalets midt. Stockholm: Norstedt. 1915.
- Färg och form, Malmtorgsgatan 10, november 1940 : minnesutställning Fritz von Dardel (1817-1901). Katalog [107]. Stockholm. 1940.
- När var tar sin. Stockholm: Carlsson. 1988.
- Herrar Black & Smith på väg till Skandinavien. Stockholm: Carlsson. 1991.
- Fritz von Dardels Gubben med skåpet : en svensk serieklassiker från 1849; [with English text]. Magister Lämpels bibliotek, 99-2988643-5. Malmö: Seriefrämjandet. 2003.
