= Henri-Pierre Castelnau =

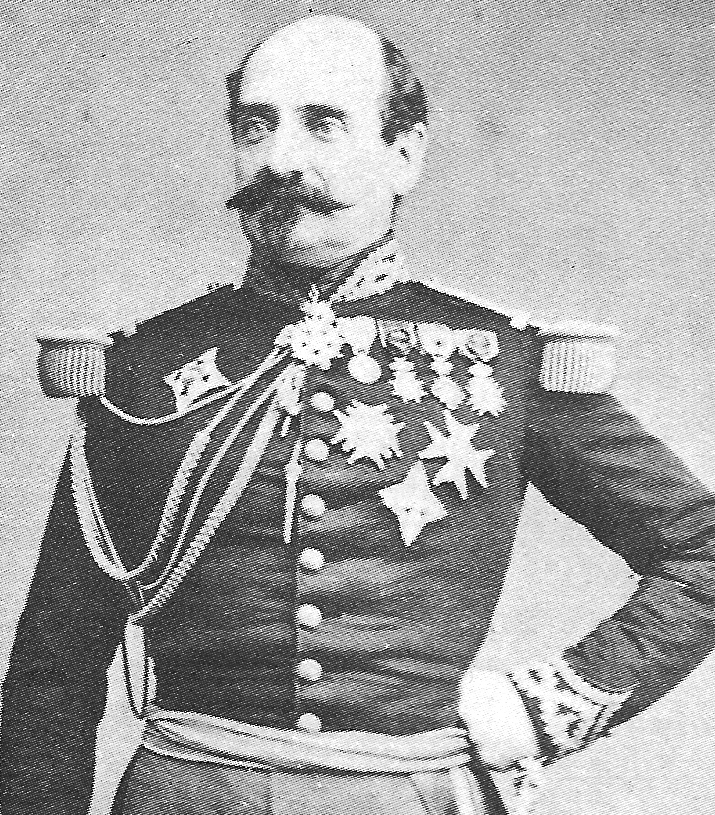
General Henri-Pierre Castelnau.

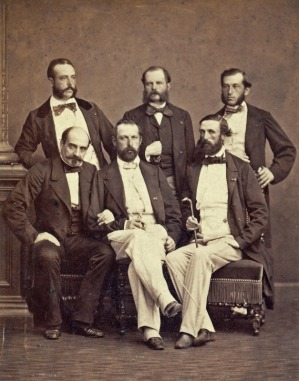
Henri-Pierre Castelnau together with Adjutant Daniel Nordlander (upper left), with Adjutant Fritz von Dardel, Ordonnance Officer Ferdinand-Alphonse Hamelin, King Charles XV of Sweden and Prince Oscar, future King Oscar II of Sweden. Likely at the International Exposition (1867) in Paris, France.

Henri-Pierre Jean Abdon Castelnau (30 July 1814 – 1 November 1890), was a French General.

Castelnau's biography was published in 1930. During his military career he was aide-de-camp for Napoleon III, and in 1859 participated in the Second Italian War of Independence. He was present at the Armistice of Villafranca in 1859. In the autumn of 1866, he was sent to Mexico to assist with the aftermath of the French invasion, and then in September 1870 was present at the Battle of Sedan, and the French surrender. He accompanied Napoleon III to his captivity in Schloss Wilhelmshöhe.
