= Nils Brage Nordlander =

Swedish speciality doctor (1919–2009)

- Born: July 1, 1919; Härnösand, Sweden
- Died: August 30, 2009 (aged 90); Uppsala, Sweden
- Occupation: Physician
- Known for: Medical research and clinical practice

Nils Brage Nordlander (29 October 1919 – 30 August 2009) was a Swedish speciality doctor attached to the Hospital of Ulleråker. As a politician, he served as the president of the county council of Uppsala, representing the Swedish People's Party, the predecessor of the Liberals.

Nordlander was active in the establishment of the Museum of Medical History in Uppsala along with his wife Brita Nordlander, to which he also became an important donor.

== Biography ==
Nordlander was born on 29 October 1919 as a son to statutory auditor John August Nordlander and Lisa Johansson. He received his Bachelor of Medical Sciences from Stockholm University and Licentiate of Medical Sciences from Uppsala University, and served as 1st Curator of the Södermanlands-Nerikes nation in Uppsala.

He married Brita Nordlander (née Redin) in 1946, a teacher and politician.

Nordlander died in August 2009.

== Medicine ==
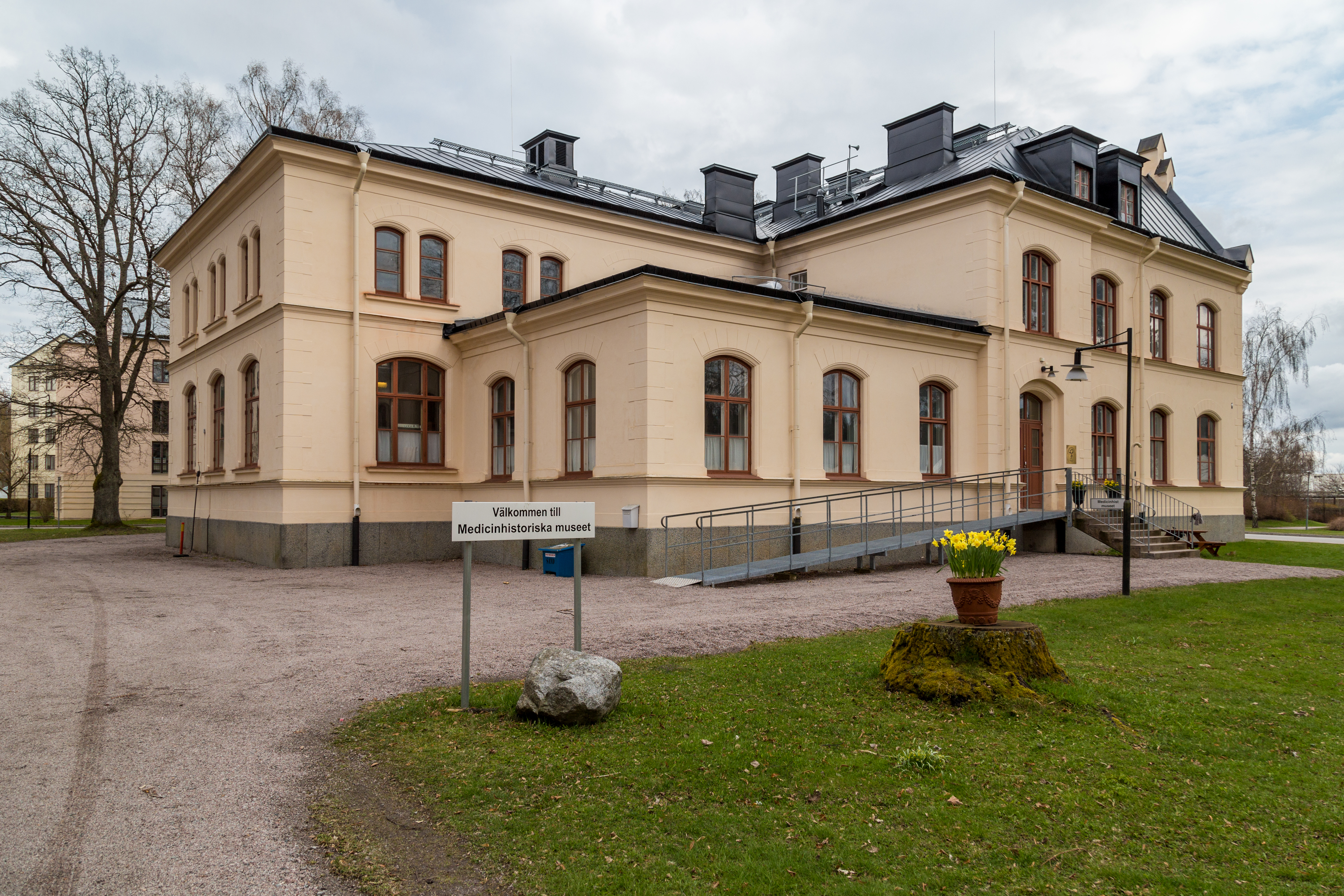
The Museum of Medical History in Uppsala.

Nordlander, a recurrent contributor to medical magazines such as Läkartidningen, was a medical pioneer in studies both on dieting and the restless legs syndrome. Besides being an early prominent advocator of the low-carbohydrate diet as "one of the leading experts on dieting", according to Hemmets Veckotidning (1966), he was also a pioneer in the study of the restless legs syndrome in 1953, treating patients by injection of iron according to his casual theory attributed to iron deficiency.

Nordlander was active in the establishment of the Museum of Medical History in Uppsala along with his wife Brita Nordlander, to which he also became an important donor.

== Politics ==
Besides his medical research, he was also a frequent contributor to the debate in daily newspapers such as Upsala Nya Tidning in his role as politician, including serving as president of the county council of Uppsala, representing the Swedish People's Party, the predecessor of the Liberals.

== Distinctions ==
- Recipient of the H.M The King's Medal, Gold in 8th Size with the sash of the Royal Order of the Seraphim
- Honorary Doctorate by the Faculty of Medicine at Uppsala University, Sweden (31 May 1985)

== Bibliography ==
Including anthologies.

- HÖRDE NI Nr 43 april 1954 (Swedish Radio)
- Husmorslexikon
- Matlexikon. Del I. Recept och praktisk matlagning.
- Sjukt i huset (1959)
- Kom och banta med oss N&K 1962, 64 p.
- Banta: de 5 bästa sätten
- Rikssalstapeterna i Uppsala slott (1992)
- Mätt på rätt sätt: råd till den som inte vill vara fet
- Friskare liv
- Människan: om människokroppen och dess arbete
- Matlexikon
- Det ska aldrig få hända mig!: om barn till alkoholister
- Sjuka själar, krassliga kroppar
