= Klockestrand =

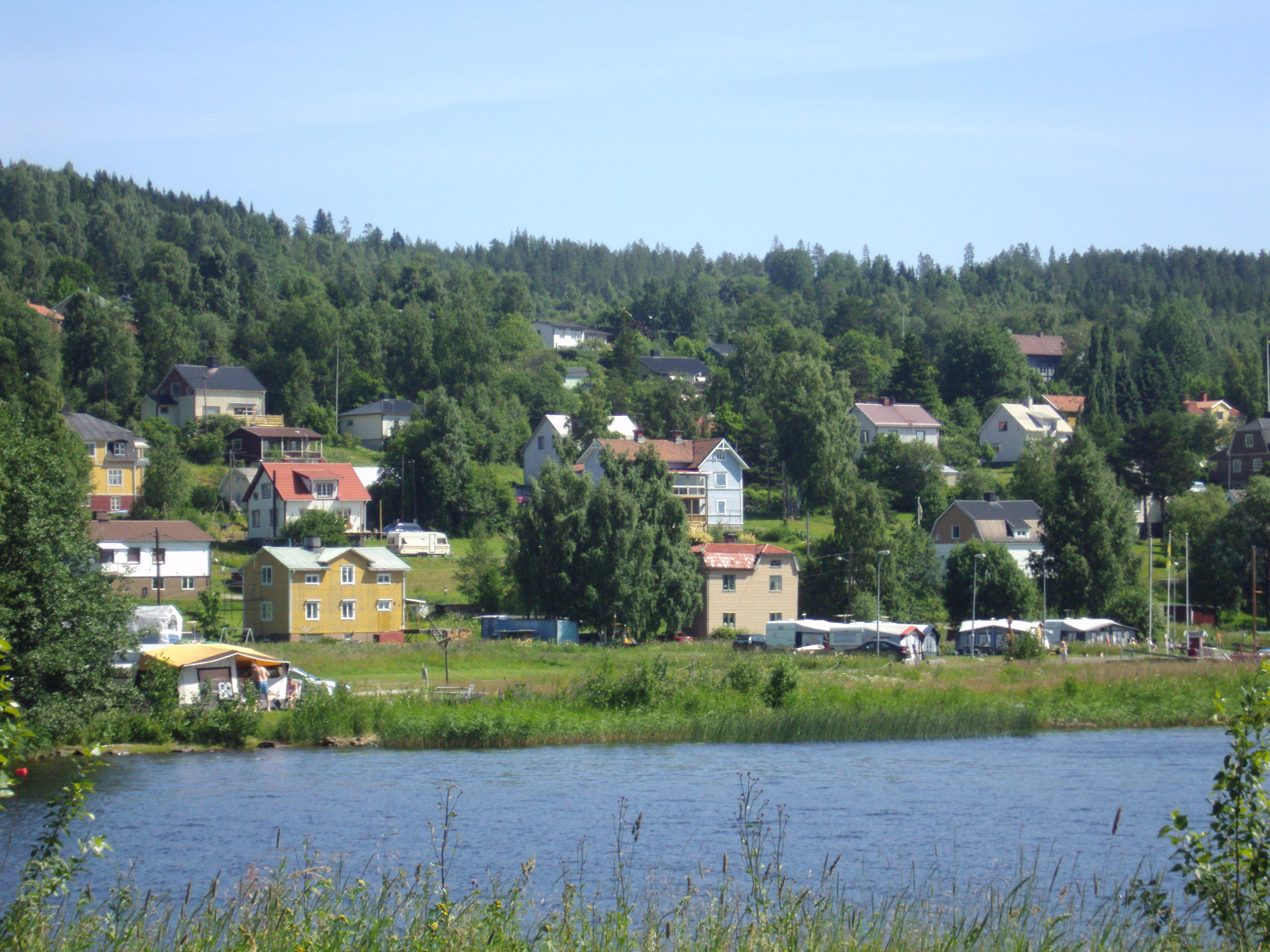

- Location within Västernorrland Location within Sweden
- Coordinates: 62°53′N 17°54′E
- Country: Sweden
- Province: Ångermanland
- County: Västernorrland County
- Municipality: Kramfors Municipality

Area
  - Total: 1.02 km^{2} (0.39 sq mi)

Population (31 December 2010)
  - Total: 315
  - Density: 309/km^{2} (800/sq mi)
- Time zone: UTC+1 (CET)
  - Summer (DST): UTC+2 (CEST)
- Climate: Dfc

Klockestrand is a locality situated in Kramfors Municipality, Västernorrland County, Sweden with 315 inhabitants in 2010.
