= Bjärtrå =

- Parish
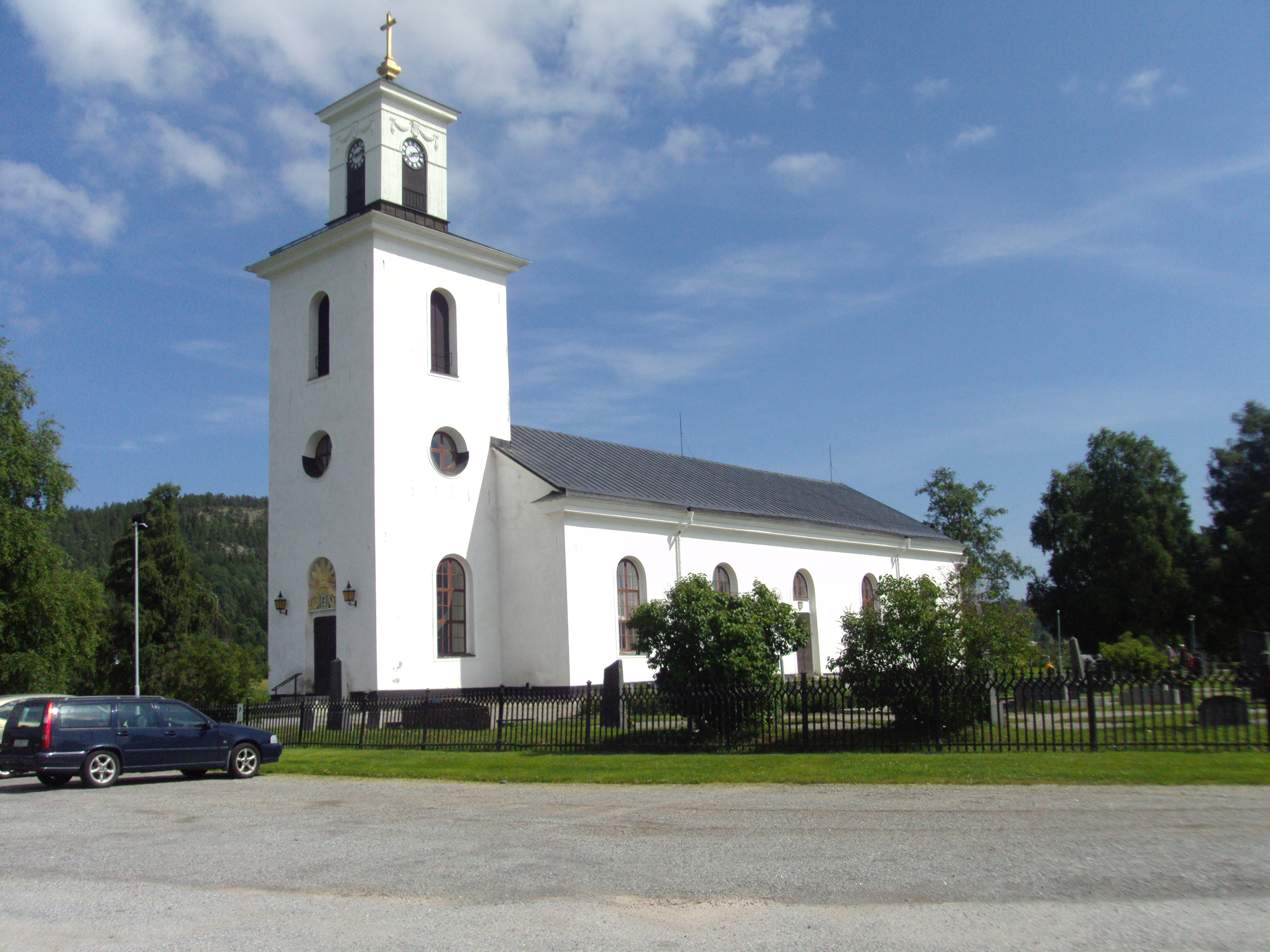
- Bjärtrå parish church

- Coat of arms
- Interactive map of Bjärtrå
- Coordinates: 62°59′N 17°52′E
- Country: Sweden
- County: Västernorrland County

Area
  - Total: 158 km^{2} (61 sq mi)

Population
  - Total: 1,687
  - Density: 10.7/km^{2} (27.7/sq mi)
- Time zone: UTC+1 (CET)
  - Summer (DST): UTC+2 (CEST)
- Province: Ångermanland
- Municipal code: 2282
- Climate: Dfc

Bjärtrå is a parish of the province of Ångermanland in Sweden. Since 1974, it has been administered as part of the Kramfors Municipality.

The parish has an area of 158 square kilometres, and in the year 2000 there were 1,687 inhabitants. The locality of Lugnvik and parts of Sandslån, Klockestrand, and Strinne, lie within Bjärtrå.

The parish was established in the Middle Ages. In 1862, the rural district of Bjärtrå was created. In 1974, this was merged into the municipality of Kramfors.

== Round Barn ==
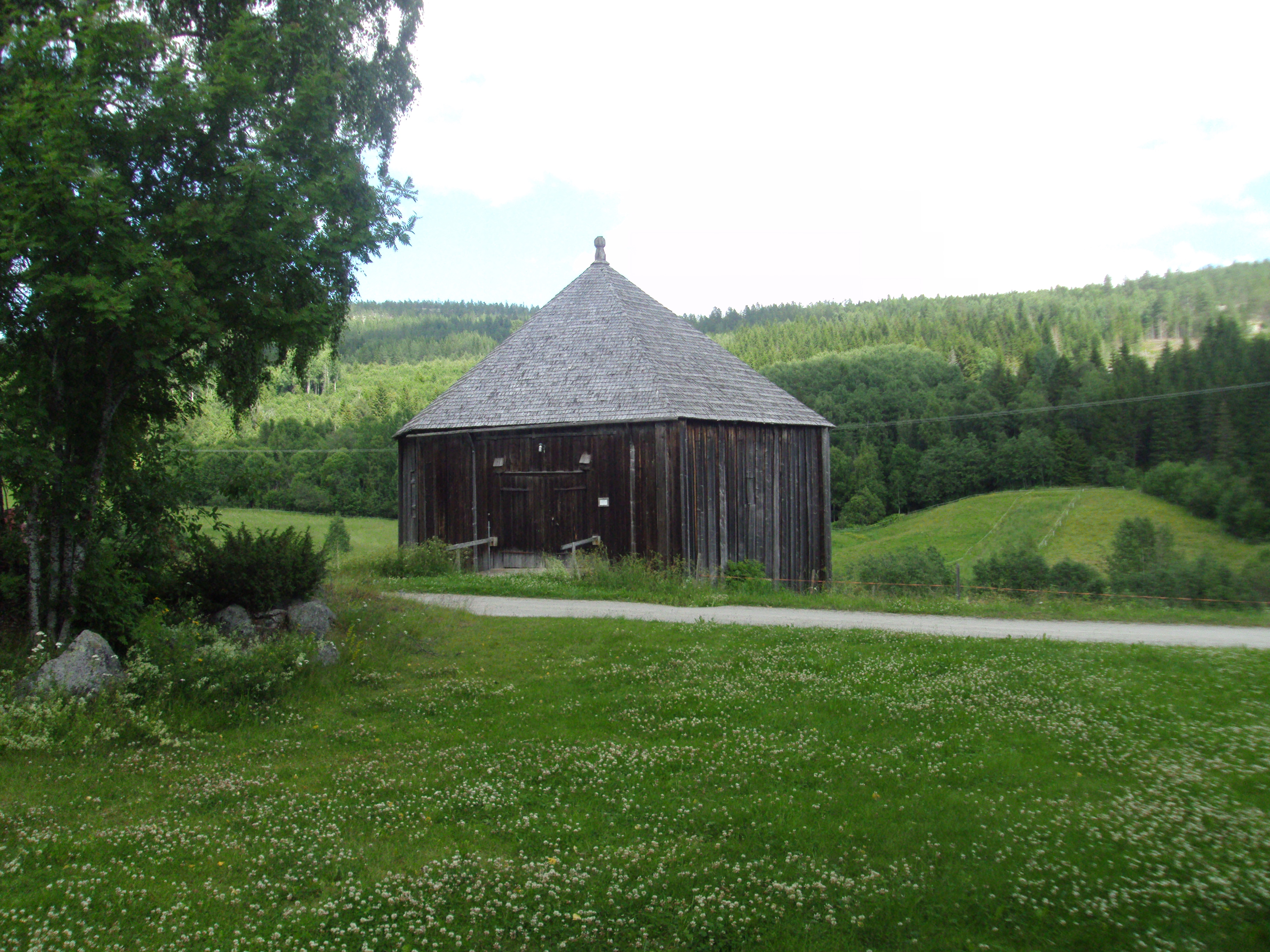
The Bjärtrå Round Barn

The Bjärtrå round barn (pictured) is a wooden building believed to have been constructed about 1848. In 1958, it was bought by a history society, which continues to maintain it.
