= Sandslån =

- Location within Västernorrland Location within Sweden
- Coordinates: 63°01′N 17°47′E
- Country: Sweden
- Province: Ångermanland
- County: Västernorrland County
- Municipality: Kramfors Municipality

Area
  - Total: 1.10 km^{2} (0.42 sq mi)

Population (31 December 2010)
  - Total: 272
  - Density: 248/km^{2} (640/sq mi)
- Time zone: UTC+1 (CET)
  - Summer (DST): UTC+2 (CEST)

Sandslån is a locality situated in Kramfors Municipality, Västernorrland County, Sweden with 272 inhabitants in 2010.
