= Lugnvik =

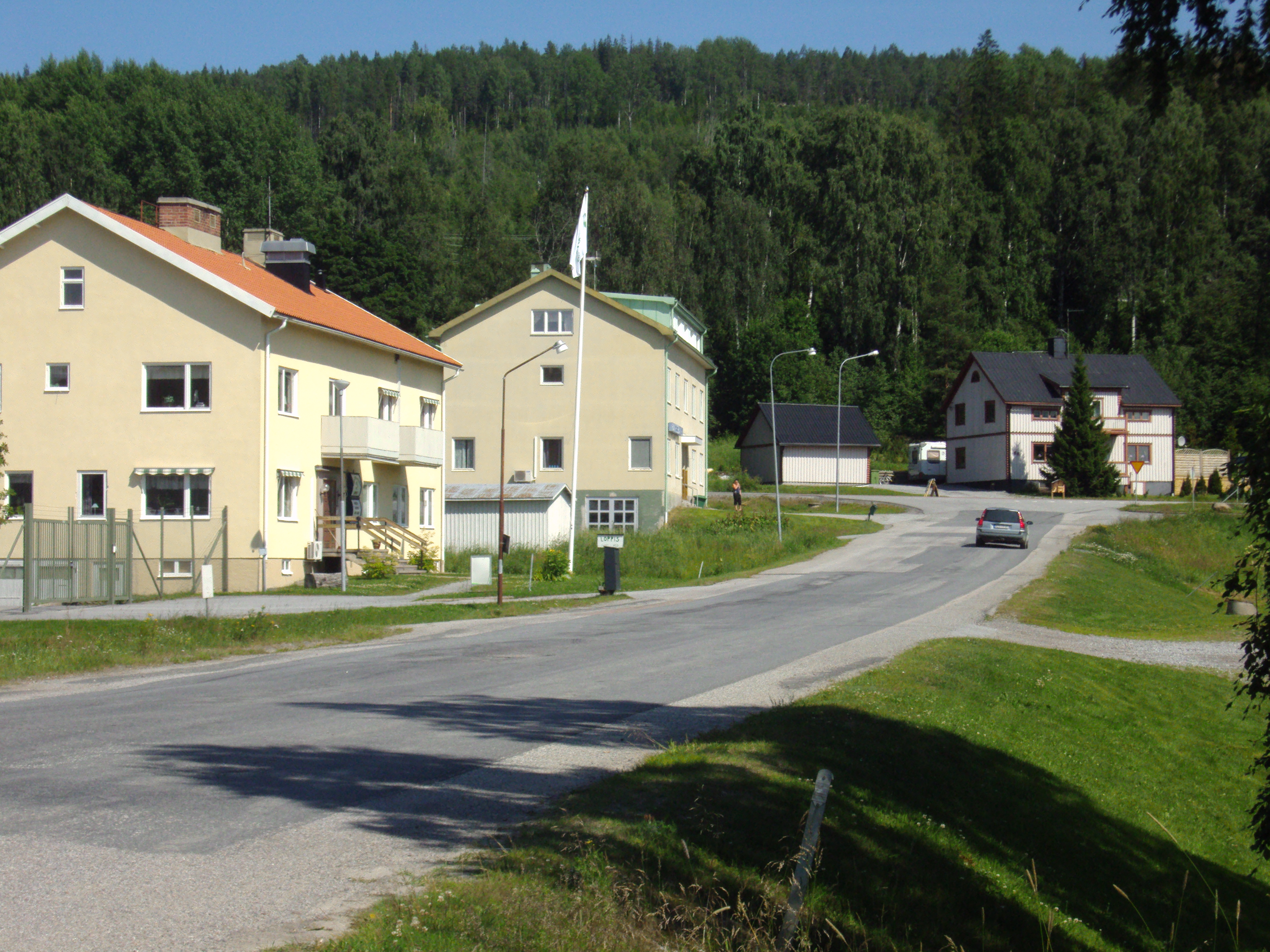

- Location within Västernorrland Location within Sweden
- Coordinates: 62°56′46.3″N 17°54′34.9″E
- Country: Sweden
- Province: Ångermanland
- County: Västernorrland County
- Municipality: Kramfors Municipality

Area
  - Total: 1.26 km^{2} (0.49 sq mi)

Population (31 December 2010)
  - Total: 349
  - Density: 277/km^{2} (720/sq mi)
- Time zone: UTC+1 (CET)
  - Summer (DST): UTC+2 (CEST)
- Climate: Dfc

Lugnvik is a locality situated in Kramfors Municipality, Västernorrland County, Sweden with 349 inhabitants in 2010.
