= Canon de 42 C model 1867 =

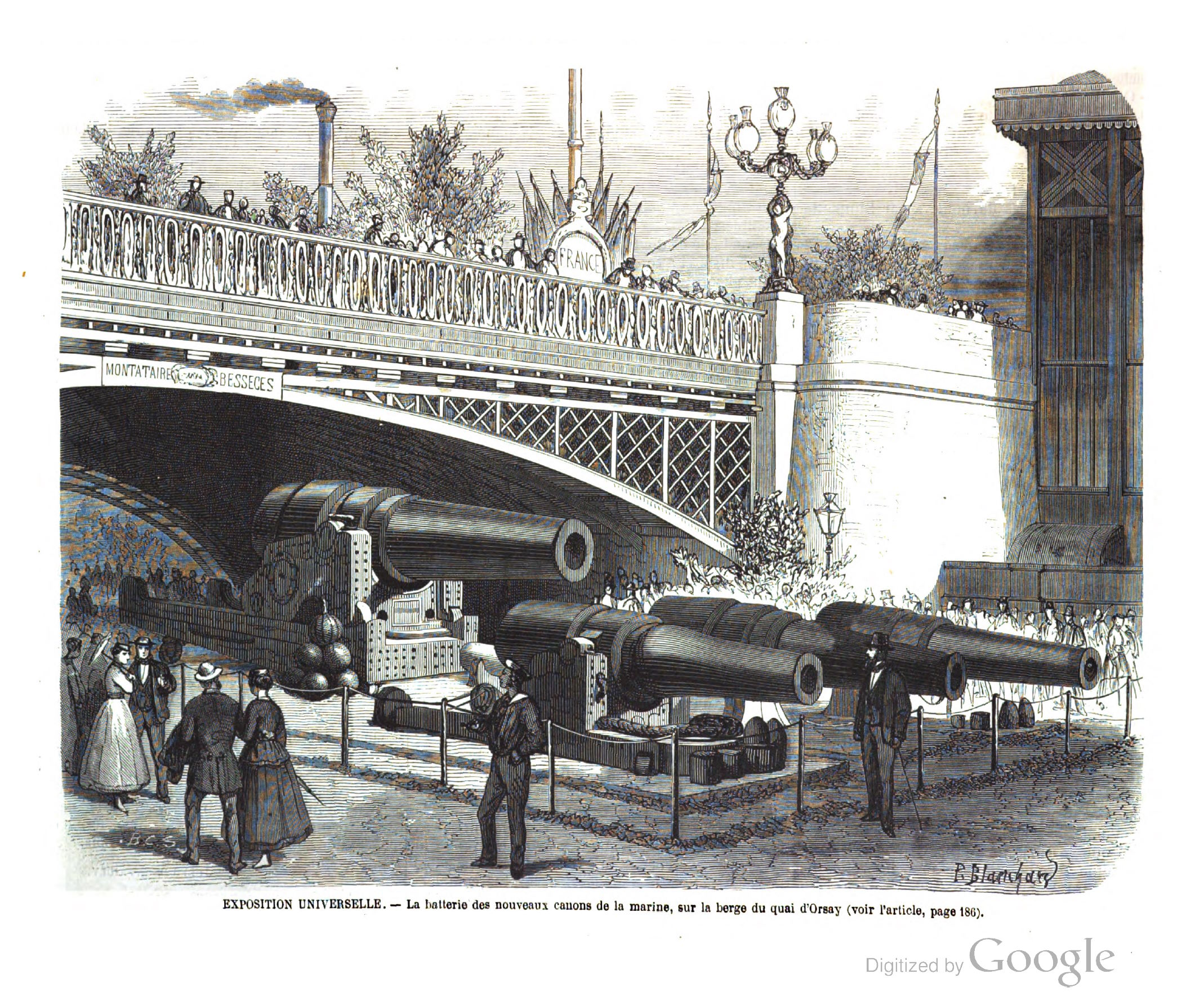
- The 42 cm gun at the 1867 Paris Exposition
- Type: Coast-defense gun
- Place of origin: France

Service history
- Used by: None (prototype)

Production history
- Manufacturer: Ruelle Foundry
- Unit cost: 31,300 Fr
- Produced: 1867
- No. built: 2

Specifications
- Mass: 38 t (37 long tons; 42 short tons)
- Shell: None
- Caliber: 420 mm (17 in)
- Elevation: °
- Traverse: 360°
- Effective firing range: 6-8,000 m

The Canon de 42 C model 1867 was a French super heavy built-up naval gun. It was the centerpiece of the exhibition of French naval guns at the 1867 Paris Exposition. It proved unsuitable for service.

== Context ==
The importance of iron armor for ships became clear during the 1853-1856 Crimean War. On the other hand, it was not that obvious how armored ships could be destroyed. A simple solution centered on increasing the caliber of the traditional smoothbore muzzle loader guns. Another option was to use elongated projectiles, which required rifling of the barrel. In the end, all countries settled on using rifled breech loaders.

In France, the Ruelle Foundry was responsible for naval artillery. In 1845, it had tested a new 50-pounder smoothbore gun. This was put into service on board some ships of the line. From 1855, Ruelle started to make rifled guns. These were mostly smoothbore muzzle-loading guns that thad been rifled and reinforced by hoops. In 1860, a new system of continuous hoops made of puddle steel was introduced.

In 1864, these developments led to the design of a new system of cast-iron breechloading rifled guns reinforced by steel rings. These guns came in the calibers: 14 cm, 16 cm (30-prd), 19 cm (50-prd), 24 cm, and 27 cm. The last of these weighed 21,000 kg and was originally meant to be only a coastal gun.

The 42 cm gun of 1867 was made according to the same design principles as the guns known as 'modèle 1864-1866'. It did not get this designation, because it was not officially taken into service. One can wonder why Ruelle suddenly determined to make a 42 cm gun. Why not first make something like the 32 cm caliber gun that the later modèle 1870 system had? A Prussian artillery officer gave an explanation that seemed very plausible: The gun was ordered when the French government became aware of Krupp's plans to send a monster gun to the 1867 Paris Exposition.

== Production ==
=== Casting and transport ===
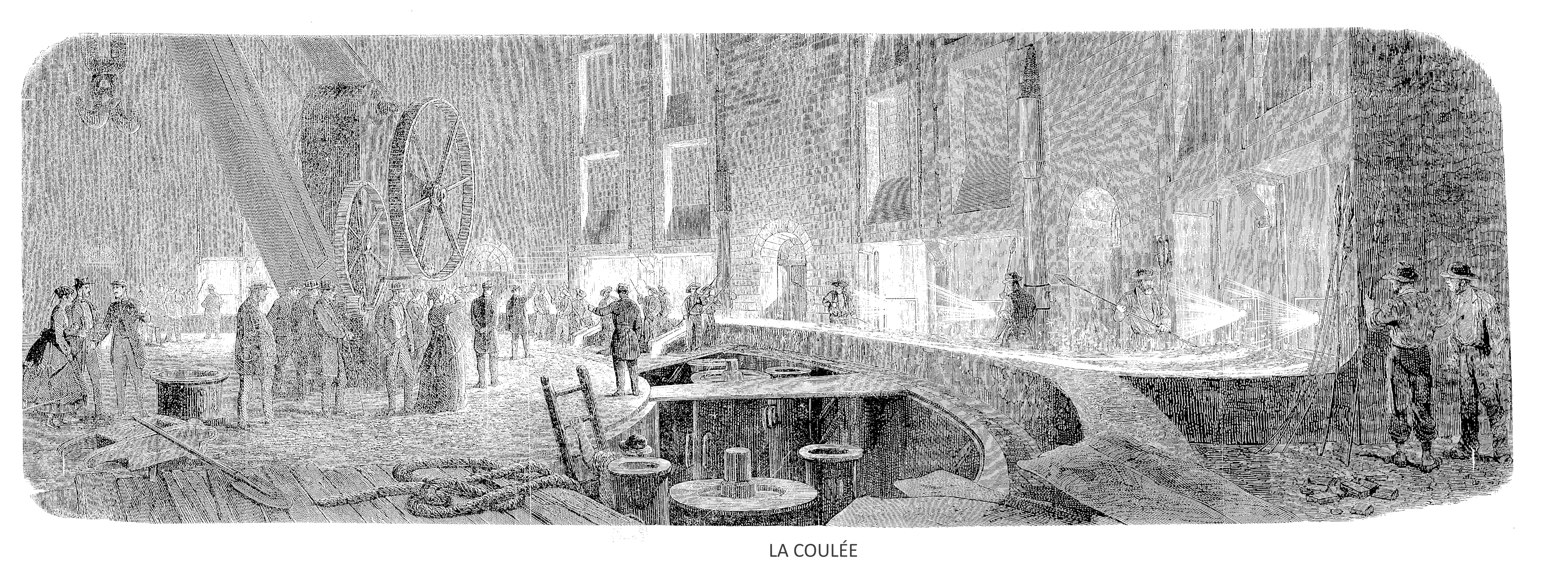
All furnaces used simultaneously at Ruelle

On 16 March 1867 a large number of visitors came to the hall of the reverbatory furnaces at the Ruelle Foundry. The casting of the first 42 cm gun was spectacular, because it required the simultaneous use of all ten furnaces of the hall. (The engraving shows this situation.) The complete casting process took 3 hours and two minutes and consumed 11,245 kg of coal. Filling the mold took five minutes. The second 42 cm gun was cast on 30 March 1867.

In the morning of 2 July 1867, the first 42 cm gun left Ruelle for Paris. The gun was placed on a strong wagon. 40 heavy draft horses were used to draw it to the Angoulême railway station. There, it was loaded on two special freight wagons and driven to Paris by the Compagnie du chemin de fer de Paris à Orléans. On 9 July it finally arrived in Paris.

=== The 1867 Paris World Exposition ===
The French Navy exhibited its new model 1864 guns at the 1867 Paris Exposition, which lasted from 1 April to 31 October. The location was on the bank of the Seine near the Pont d'Iéna. Here, the Canon de 42 cm was also exhibited, but it came in late. At the time, it was said to have been made for the coastal defense.

=== Further service ===
After the exposition, the Paris 42 cm gun was transported from the Pont Cardinet station in Paris to the Cherbourg station. This transport cost 3,700 Francs. By 1 December, there was a buzz about the tests that would be done at Cherbourg. It was claimed that the gun would be tested on board Rochambeau and that it would use cylindrical and ogive projectiles.

The second 42 cm gun left Ruelle for Rochefort on 7 August 1867. From there, it was said to have been sent to the artillery range at Gâvres. While there, it was planned to fire a slightly oblong 304 kg projectile as an experiment. This experiment does not seem to have been executed.

== Characteristics ==
=== Barrel ===
The barrel of the 42 cm Paris gun had a caliber of 420 mm. It was a built-up gun, consisting of a cast-iron core and two layers of steel frettes. These frettes were shrunk onto the tube close together, very much like the rings of the later Krupp Ring-Kanonen. The barrel weighed 38,200 kg.

The Paris 42 cm 1867 gun was a breechloader with a smoothbore barrel. A smoothbore breechloader seemed to be a contradictio in adjecto. This strange construction seemed to be confirmed by the images of the Paris exhibition, which showed a pile of traditional spherical iron bullets near the gun.

However, the Paris exposition also showed elongated grenades of 42 cm. This would only make sense if the gun was intended to be rifled Indeed, while it was admitted that the Paris gun was a smoothbore, it was claimed that the gun would be rifled by drawing five parabolic grooves going from left to right. Also, the spherical bullets piled up next to the Paris gun did not imply anything permanent. The other model 1864 guns were able to fire both elongated and spherical projectiles.

=== Carriage ===
The Paris gun was mounted on an iron and sheet metal carriage which slid over a frame known as a slide. Together, carriage and slide weighed 20,000 kg. The slide was on a turntable which allowed a 360° traverse. Elevation was done via a roller chain moved by a cogwheel on either side of the carriage. Lateral pointing was done via the wheels at the back of the slide, which allowed a very controlled movement.

=== Projectiles ===
With a charge of 50 kg, the Paris gun launched a spherical bullet of 250 kg. This claim makes sense, as a sphere of 42 cm has a volume of about 39 liters. As iron has a density of about 8, this translates to a weight of almost 250 kg. At the time that it was exhibited in Paris, its range had not yet been determined.

After rifling, the gun was expected to fire an ogive projectile of 750 kg, giving a range of 6–8,000 m. It was later claimed that the 42 cm gun had the same rifling as the (other) modèle 1864 guns. However, the idea to fire a 750 kg projectile was abandoned after consideration of the relative strength of the barrel. An overview of the relative weights of the modèle 1864 guns shows that a gun of about double the weight was required for such a projectile.

Weights of modèle 1864 guns
Gun	Barrel	Round bullet	Projectile	Barrel/Bullet
Canon de 16 C modèle 1864	5,000 kg	15 kg	45 kg	333
Canon de 19 C modèle 1864	8,000 kg	25 kg	75 kg	320
Canon de 24 C modèle 1864	14,500 kg	48 kg	144 kg	302
Canon de 27 C modèle 1864	20,500 kg		216 kg	
Canon de 42 C model 1867	38,200 kg	250 kg	750 kg	150
