= Exposition Universelle (1867) =

World's Fair held in Paris, France

1868 Paris
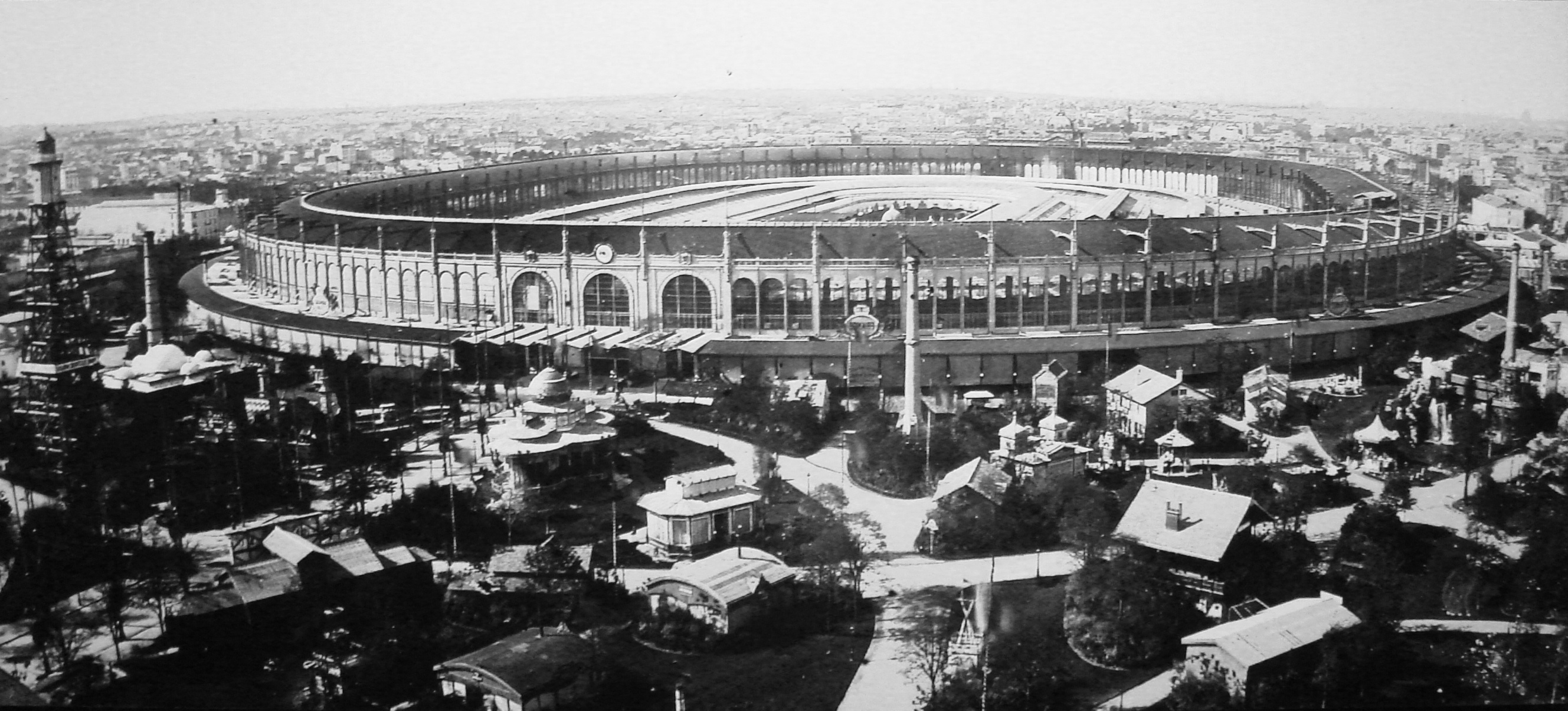
- Main building at the Champ de Mars

Overview
- BIE-class: Universal exposition
- Category: Historical Expo
- Name: Exposition universelle
- Area: 68.7 hectares (170 acres)
- Invention(s): Hydraulic elevator, Reinforced concrete
- Visitors: 15,000,000

Participant(s)
- Countries: 42
- Business: 52,200

Location
- Country: France
- City: Paris
- Venue: Champ-de-Mars
- Coordinates: 48°51′21.7945″N 2°17′52.3703″E

Timeline
- Opening: April 1 – October 31, 1867 (6 months, 4 weeks and 2 days)
- Closure: 31 October 1867; 158 years ago

Universal expositions
- Previous: 1862 International Exhibition in London
- Next: Weltausstellung 1873 Wien in Vienna

The Exposition Universelle of 1867 (French pronunciation: [ɛkspozisjɔ̃ ynivɛʁsɛl]), better known in English as the 1867 Paris Exposition, was a world's fair held in Paris, France, from 1 April to 3 November 1867. It was the second of ten major expositions held in the city between 1855 and 1937. (Note: This includes six world expositions (in 1855, 1867, 1878, 1889, 1900 and 1937), two specialized expositions (in 1881 and 1925) and two colonial expositions (in 1907 and 1931).) A number of nations were represented at the fair. Following a decree of Emperor Napoleon III, the exposition was prepared as early as 1864, in the midst of the renovation of Paris, marking the culmination of the Second French Empire. Visitors included Tsar Alexander II of Russia, a brother of the King William and Otto von Bismarck of Prussia, Prince Metternich and Franz Josef of Austria, Ottoman Sultan Abdülaziz, and the Khedive of Egypt Isma'il.

== Conception ==
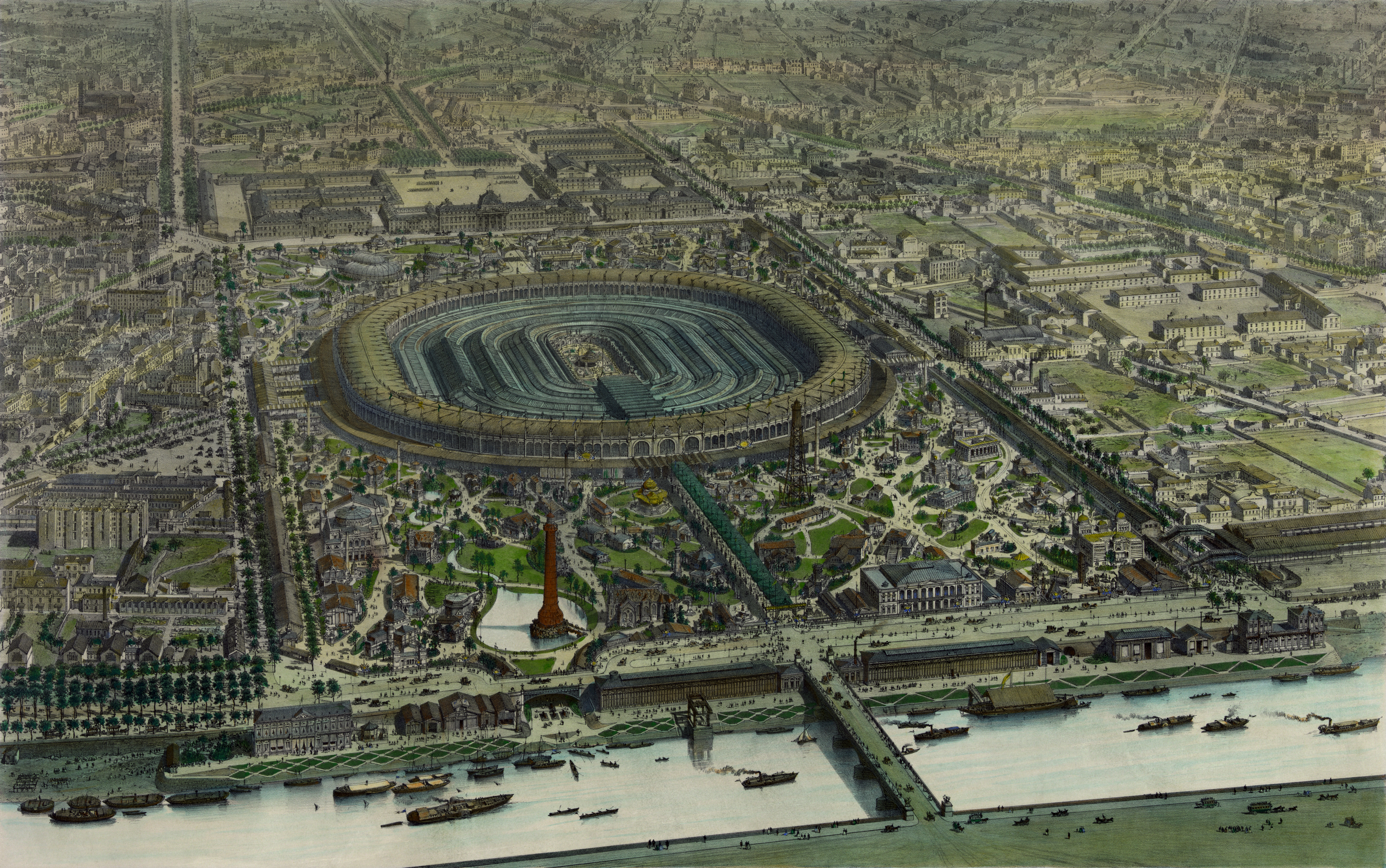
Official bird's-eye view of Exposition Universelle of 1867

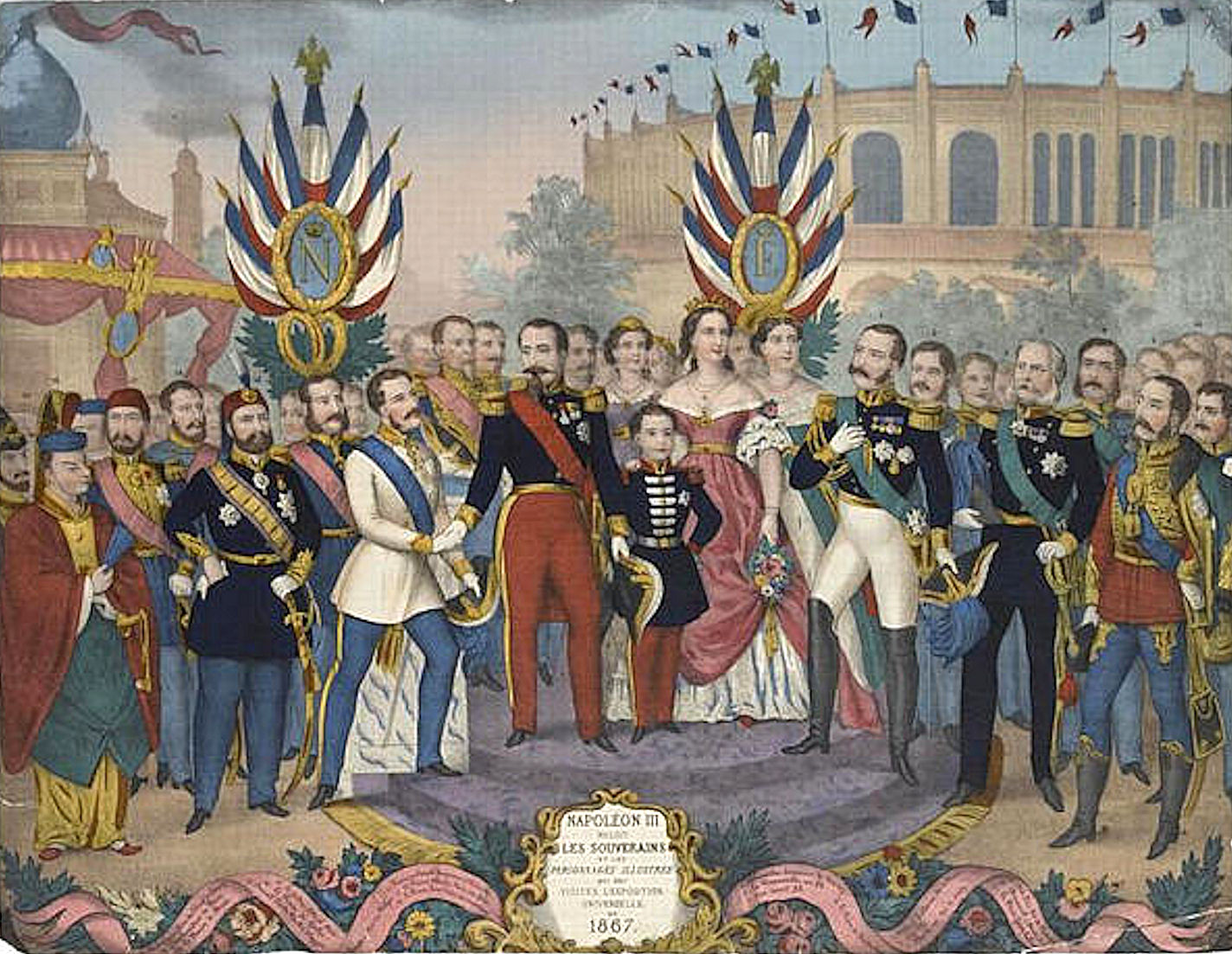
Napoleon III receives the rulers and illustrious men who visited the Exposition universelle of 1867.

In 1864, Napoleon III issued a decree stating that an international exposition should be held in Paris in 1867. A commission was appointed with Prince Jerome Napoleon as president, under whose direction the preliminary work began. The site chosen for the Exposition Universelle of 1867 was the Champ de Mars, the great military parade ground of Paris, which covered an area of 48 hectares and to which was added the island of Billancourt, of 21Ha. The principal building was rectangular in shape with rounded ends, having a length of 490m and a width of 380m, and in the center was a pavilion surmounted by a dome and surrounded by a garden, 166m long and 56m wide, with a gallery built completely around it. In addition to the main building, there were nearly 100 smaller buildings on the grounds. Victor Hugo, Alexandre Dumas, Ernest Renan, and Theophile Gautier all wrote publications to promote the event.

== Exhibits ==
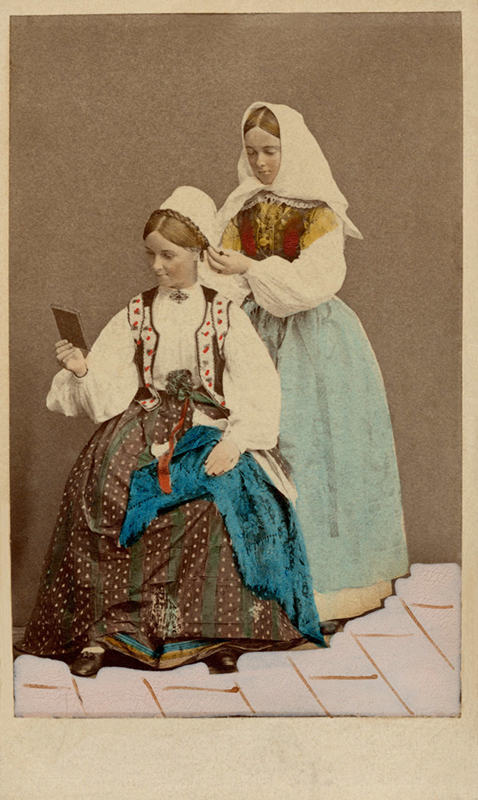
Swedish folk costumes on display at the International Exposition in 1867

There were 50,226 exhibitors, of whom 15,055 were from France and its colonies, 6176 from Great Britain and Ireland, 703 from the United States and a small contingent from Canada. The funds for the construction and maintenance of the exposition consisted of grants of $1,165,020 from the French government, a like amount from the city of Paris, and about $2,000,000 from public subscription, making a total of $5,883,400; while the receipts were estimated to have been but $2,822,900, thus leaving a deficit, which, however, was offset by the subscriptions from the government and the city of Paris, so that the final report was made to show a gain.

Bateaux Mouches, boats capable of carrying 150 passengers, entered service conveying visitors along the Seine to and from the exhibition. There was also a new railway line built to convey passengers around the outer edge of Paris to the Champ de Mars. Two double-decker hot air balloons, the Géant and the Céleste, were moored to the site and manned by the famous photographer Nadar. Nadar would take groups of 12 or more people for flights above the grounds, where they could enjoy views of the site and Paris. Willème's photosculptures were displayed in a dedicated pavilion.

In the "History of Work gallery", Jacques Boucher de Perthes, exhibited early prehistoric tools, the authenticity of which had just been recognised, in proof of his theories. Napoléon III was particularly interested in exhibiting prototypes, designs, and models of workers' housing in the section of the exposition dedicated to workers' living conditions. He commissioned the architect Eugène Lacroix to design and build a set of four buildings on the rue de Monttessuy, at the edge of the exposition grounds, to demonstrate that affordable, decent housing for the working classes could be built at a profit.

The exhibition also included two prototypes of the much acclaimed and prize-winning hydrochronometer invented in 1867 by Gian Battista Embriaco, O.P. (Ceriana 1829 - Rome 1903), professor at the College of St. Thomas in Rome.

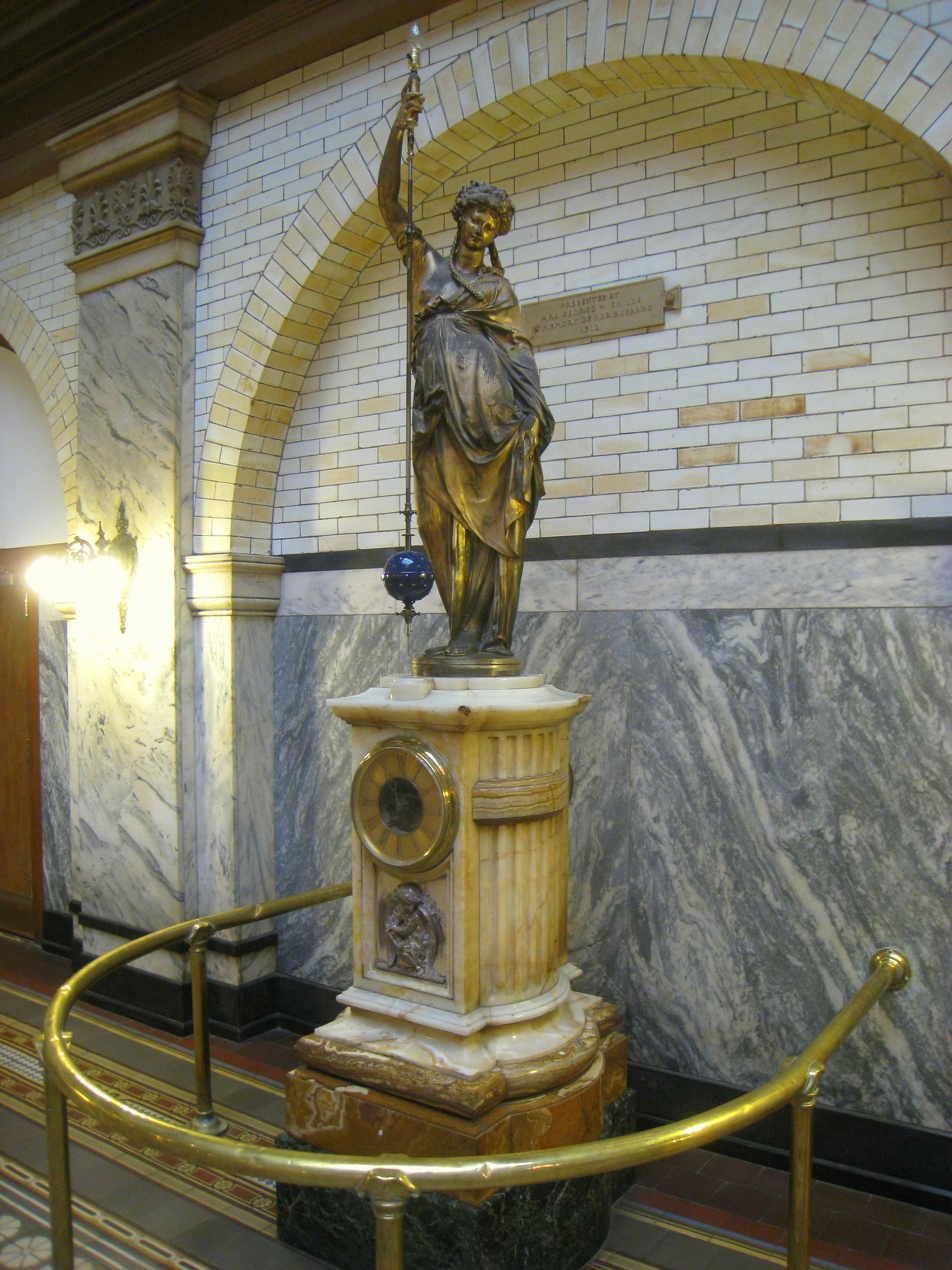
A monumental conical pendulum clock by Eugène Farcot (1867), Drexel University, USA

One of the Egyptian exhibits was designed by Auguste Mariette, and featured ancient Egyptian monuments. The Suez Canal Company had an exhibit within the Egyptian exhibits, taking up two rooms at the event. Which it used to sell bonds for funding.

The fair included a large ordnance section, showing improvements made in recent wars, in rifling, breechloading, and armored ships. The huge naval guns that were exhibited drew a lot of attention. The British government sent in a 30.5 cm (12.0 in) gun that weighed 23 tonnes. The German manufacturer Krupp displayed a 35.5 cm (14.0 in) steel gun that weighed 50-tonnes. During the exhibition, the French government introduced a 42 cm (17 in) gun that weighed 38-tonnes. Other nations that sent ordnance were: Austria, Belgium, Saxony, Holland, Egypt, and others.

Contemporary accounts, such as François Ducuing's L'Exposition Universelle de 1867 Illustrée (1867), provide detailed descriptions of the artillery exhibits in the Machinery Gallery.

The Prussian display featured a massive 50-tonne cast-steel breech-loading gun (35.5 cm calibre) manufactured by Friedrich Krupp of Essen. Forged under a 50-tonne steam hammer and reinforced with steel hoops, it required a specially built 23-tonne railway wagon for transport to Paris.

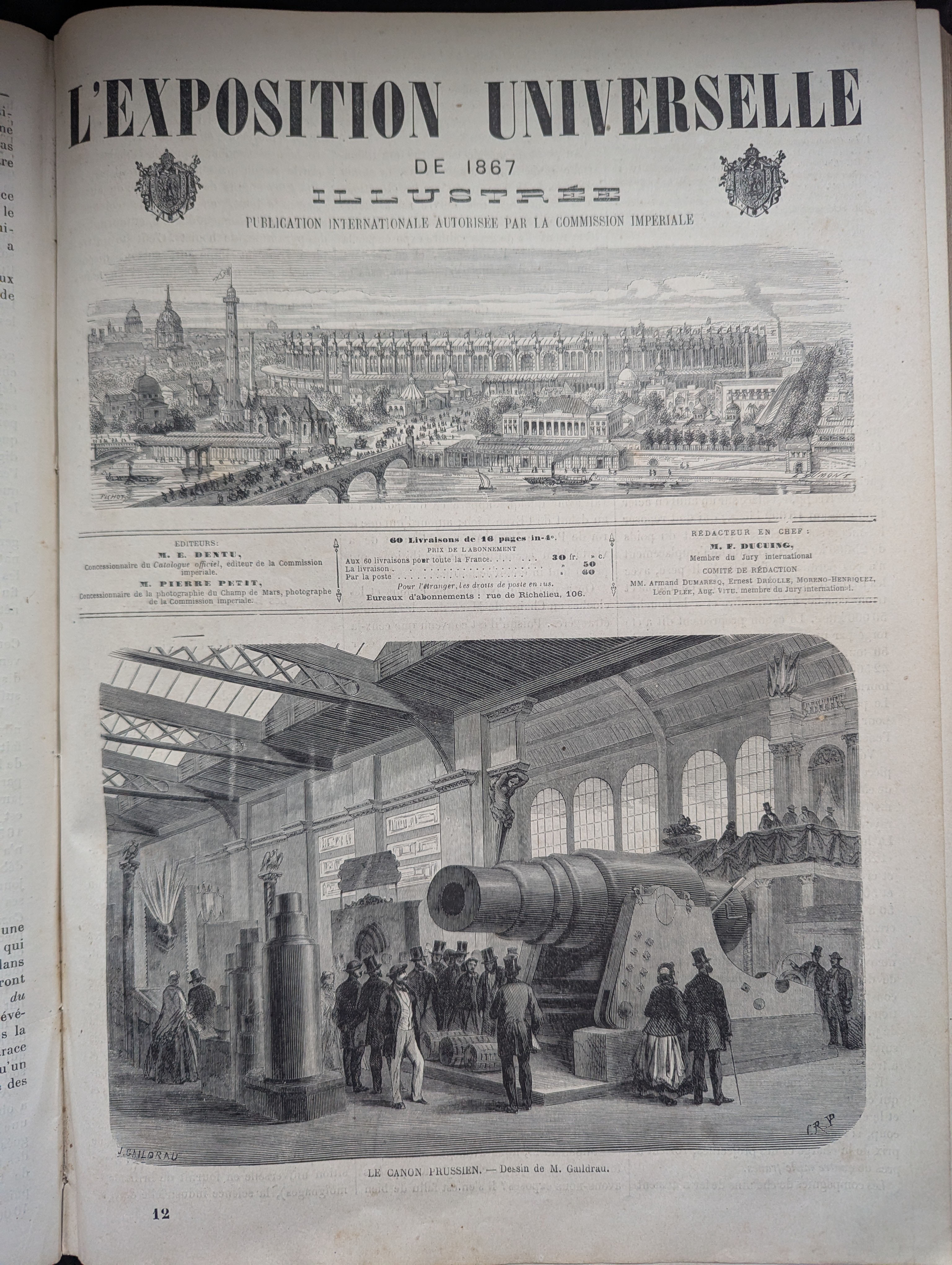
The 50-tonne Krupp gun exhibited in 1867 (contemporary illustration).

Britain exhibited naval guns including a 9-inch (22.8 cm) Armstrong gun (12.5 tonnes) with an innovative recoil brake and loading cradle, as well as a Whitworth gun notable for its hexagonal rifling.

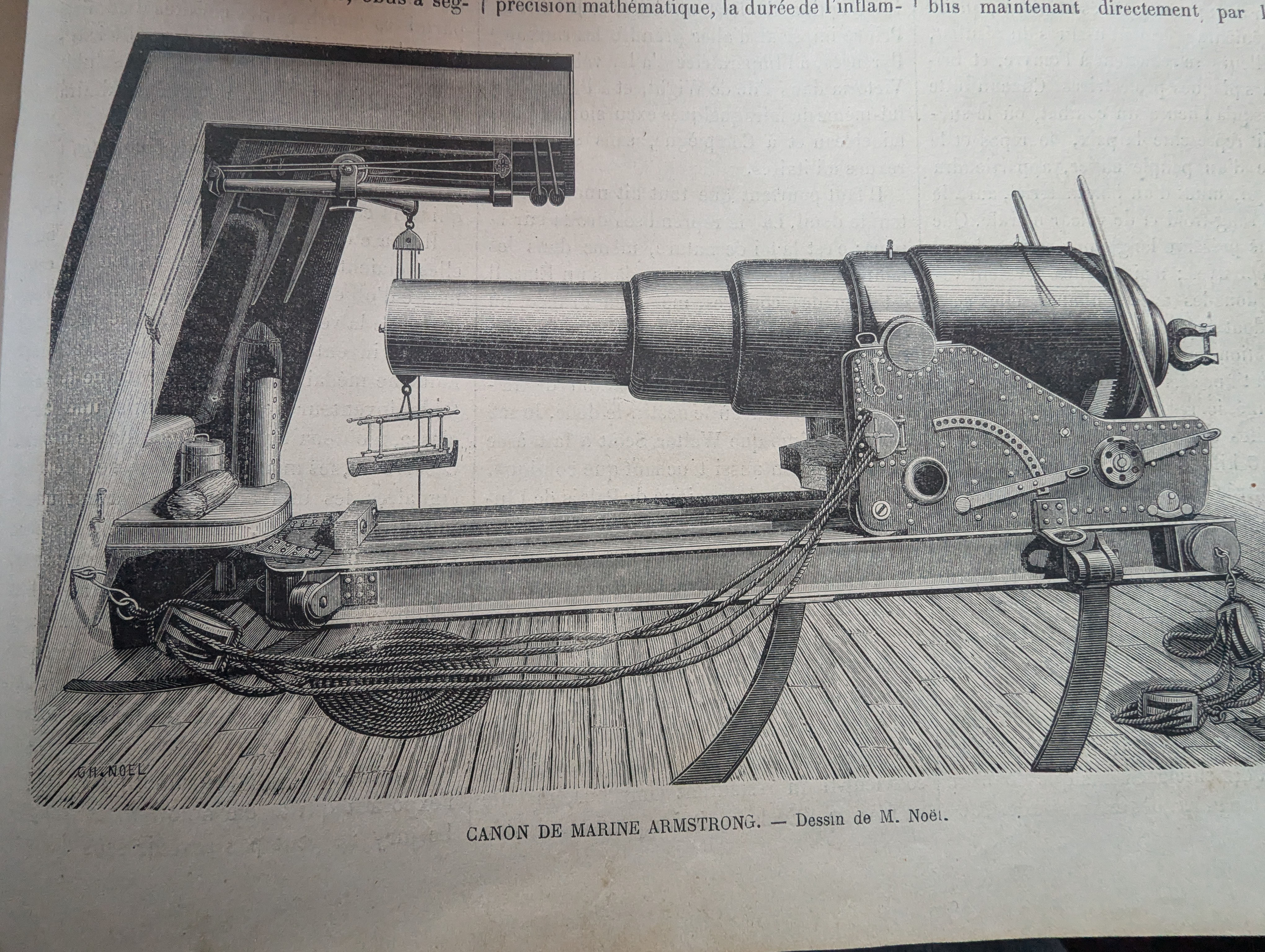
Armstrong 9-inch naval gun with recoil brake.

Sweden presented metallurgy from the Finspång works, including composite projectiles (hardened steel surface with cast-iron core) and heavy guns displayed in the park.

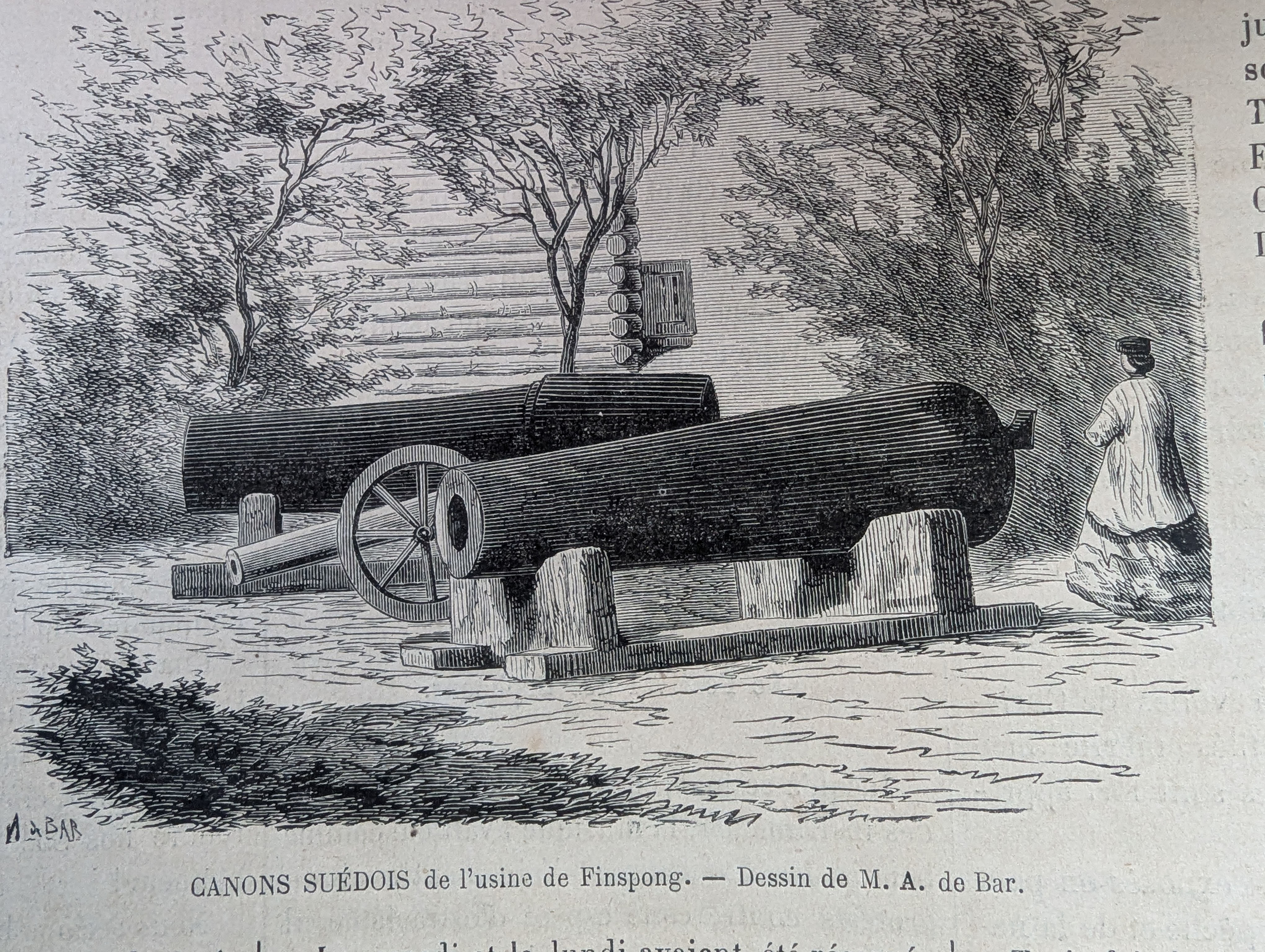
Swedish guns from Finspång exhibited in the park.

France showed its new breech-loading naval artillery reinforced with hot-fitted steel hoops. The largest piece was a 42 cm coast-defense gun weighing approximately 37–38 tonnes, capable of firing 300 kg projectiles to a range of about 7,800 metres.

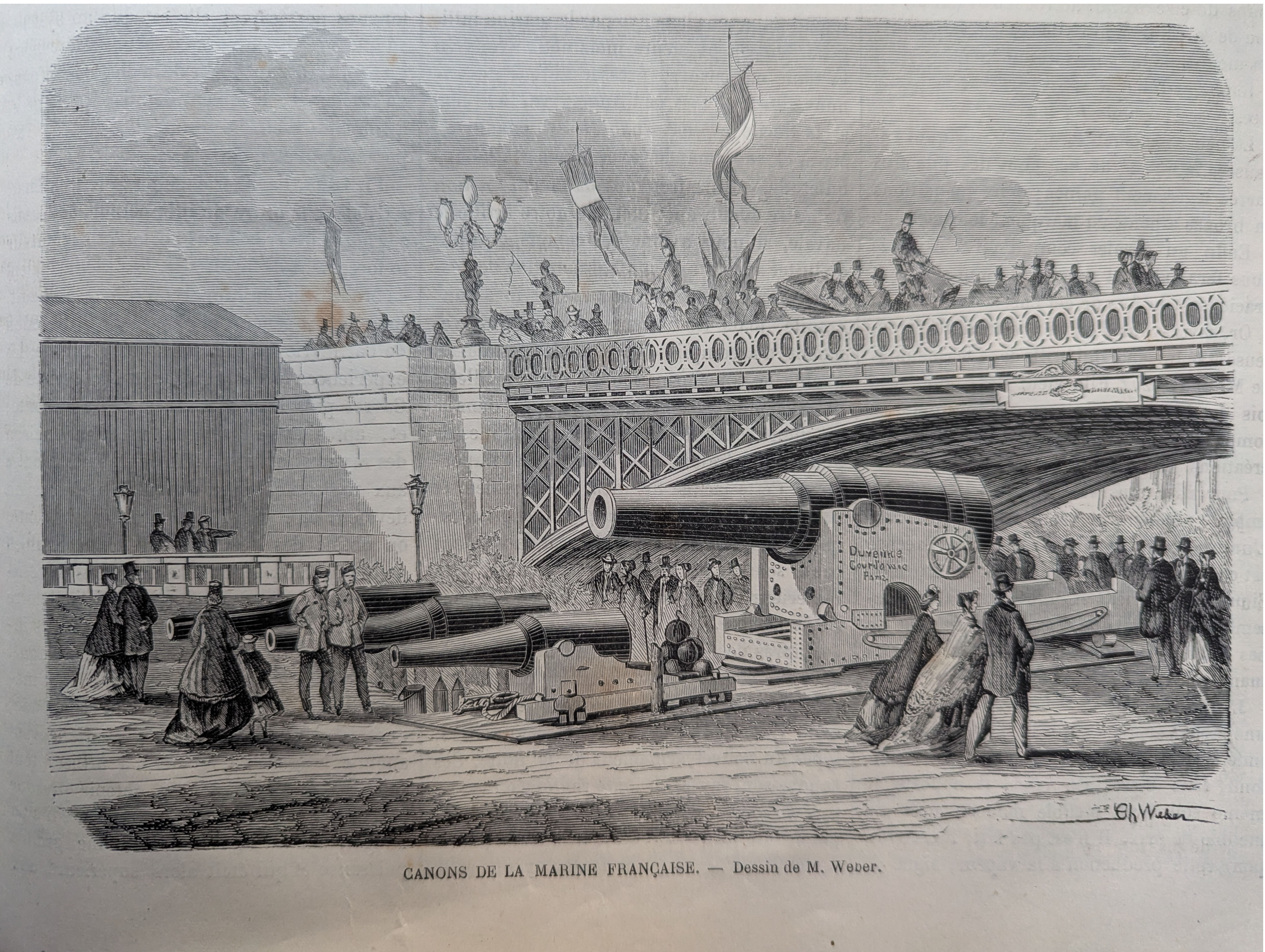
French naval artillery park (drawing by Weber).

These displays illustrated the rapid progress in heavy steel artillery and breech-loading technology among European powers shortly before the Franco-Prussian War of 1870.

Americans displayed their latest telegraph technology and both Cyrus Field and Samuel Morse provided speeches.

French explorer and early ethnobotanist Marie-Théophile Griffon du Bellay exhibited a display of dried specimens of some 450 species of useful plant, collected in the course of his recent explorations of Gabon and annotated with accounts of the uses to which they were put in their native land. Most notable among these were the powerful stimulant and hallucinogen Tabernanthe iboga, containing the alkaloid ibogaine, (currently being investigated as a cure for heroin and other addictions), the legume Griffonia simplicifolia (found, subsequently, to be rich in the serotonin precursor 5-HTP), and Strophanthus hispidus, an effective arrow poison, due to its containing cardiac glycosides with digoxin-like effects. Griffon du Bellay was awarded two medals for his exhibit.

The exposition was formally opened on 1 April and closed on 31 October 1867, and was visited by 9,238,967 persons, including exhibitors and employees. This exposition was the greatest up to its time of all international expositions, both with respect to its extent and to the scope of its plan.

== Influence ==
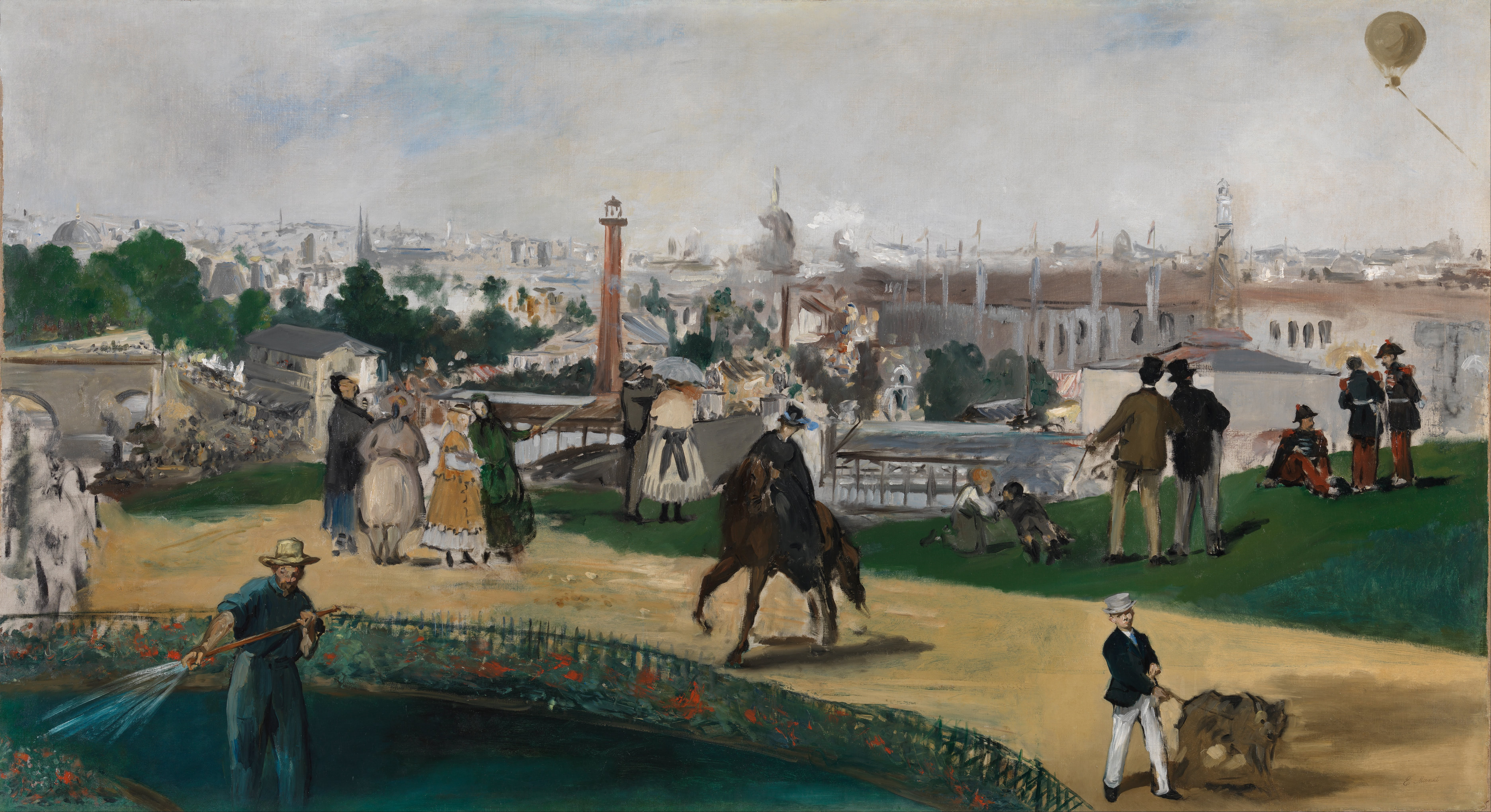
Édouard Manet (1867), View of the 1867 Exposition Universelle, unfinished oil on canvas 108 cm x 196 cm. National Gallery, Oslo

For the first time Japan presented artwork to the world in a national pavilion, especially pieces from the Satsuma and Saga domains in Kyushu. Vincent van Gogh and other artists of the Post-Impressionism movement of the late 19th century were inspired by the displays seen here, and wrote often of the Japanese woodcut prints "that one sees everywhere, landscapes and figures." Not only was Van Gogh a collector of the new art brought to Europe from the newly opened Japan, but many other French artists from the late 19th century were also influenced by the Japanese artistic world-view, to develop into Japonism.

The Paris street near Champs de Mars, Rue de L'Exposition was named in homage to this 1867 universal exhibition.

Jules Verne visited the exhibition in 1867 where he saw novel applications of electricity and a model of the French submarine Le Plongeur which inspired his electrically-powered Nautilus in Twenty Thousand Leagues Under the Seas.

A famous revival of the ballet Le Corsaire was staged by the Ballet Master Joseph Mazilier in honor of the exhibition at the Théâtre Impérial de l'Opéra on 21 October 1867.

The World Rowing Championships were held on the Seine River in July and was won by the underdog Canadian team from Saint John, New Brunswick which was quickly dubbed by the media as The Paris Crew.

== Gallery ==
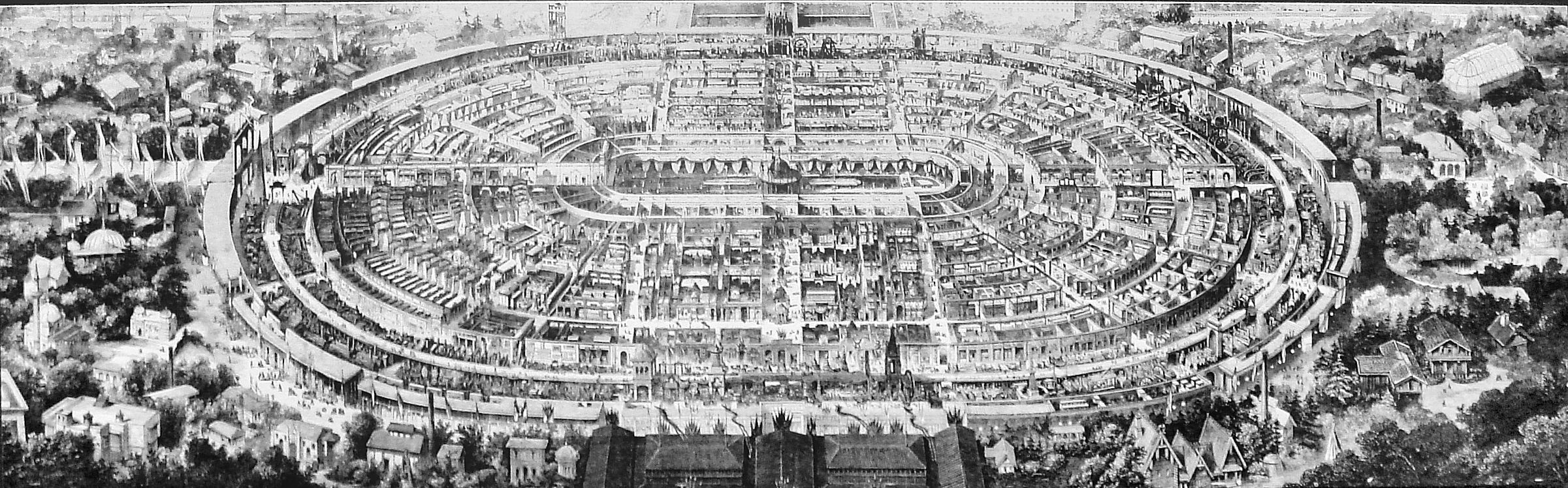
Engraving of the Exposition Universelle (1867)

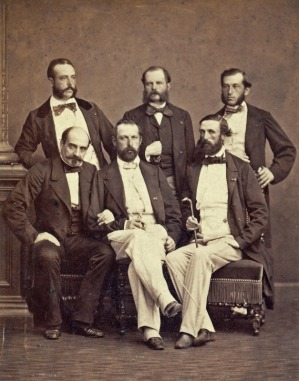
Adjutant Daniel Nordlander (upper left), with Adjutant Fritz von Dardel, Ordonnance Officer Ferdinand-Alphonse Hamelin, General Henri-Pierre Castelnau, King Charles XV of Sweden and Prince Oscar, future King Oscar II of Sweden

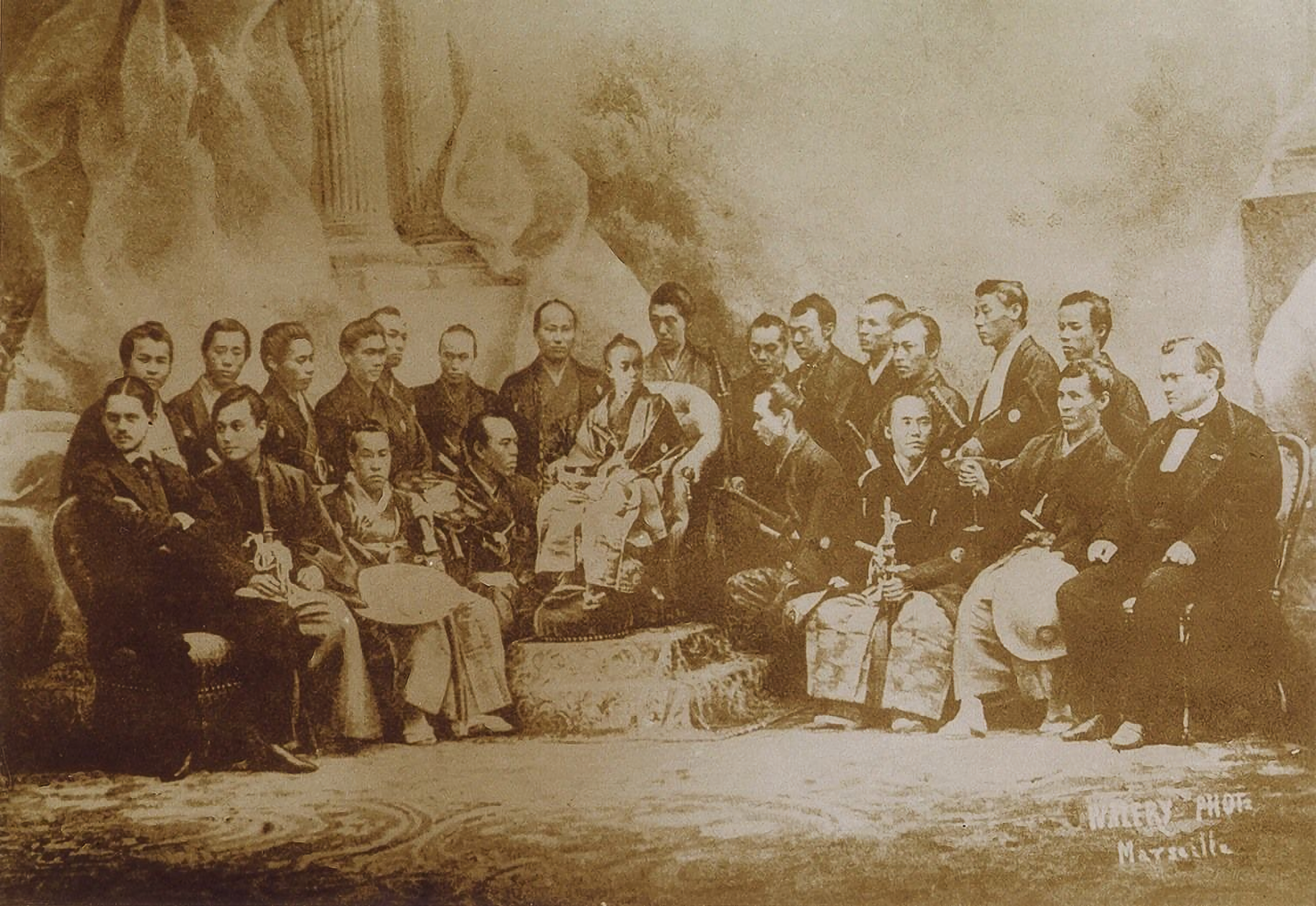
The Japanese delegation to the Exposition Universelle

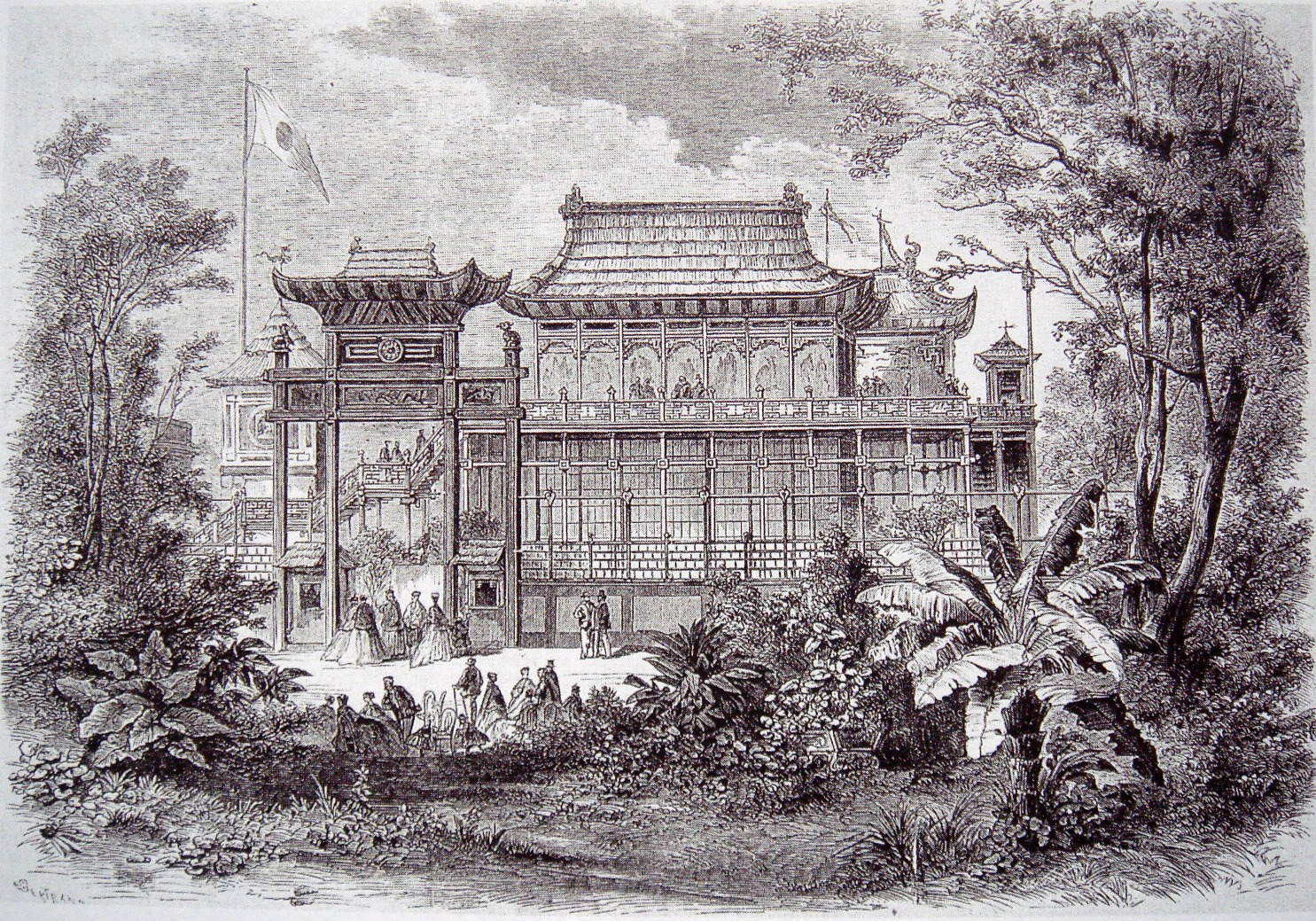
Chinese and Japanese exhibits at the 1867 Exposition Universelle

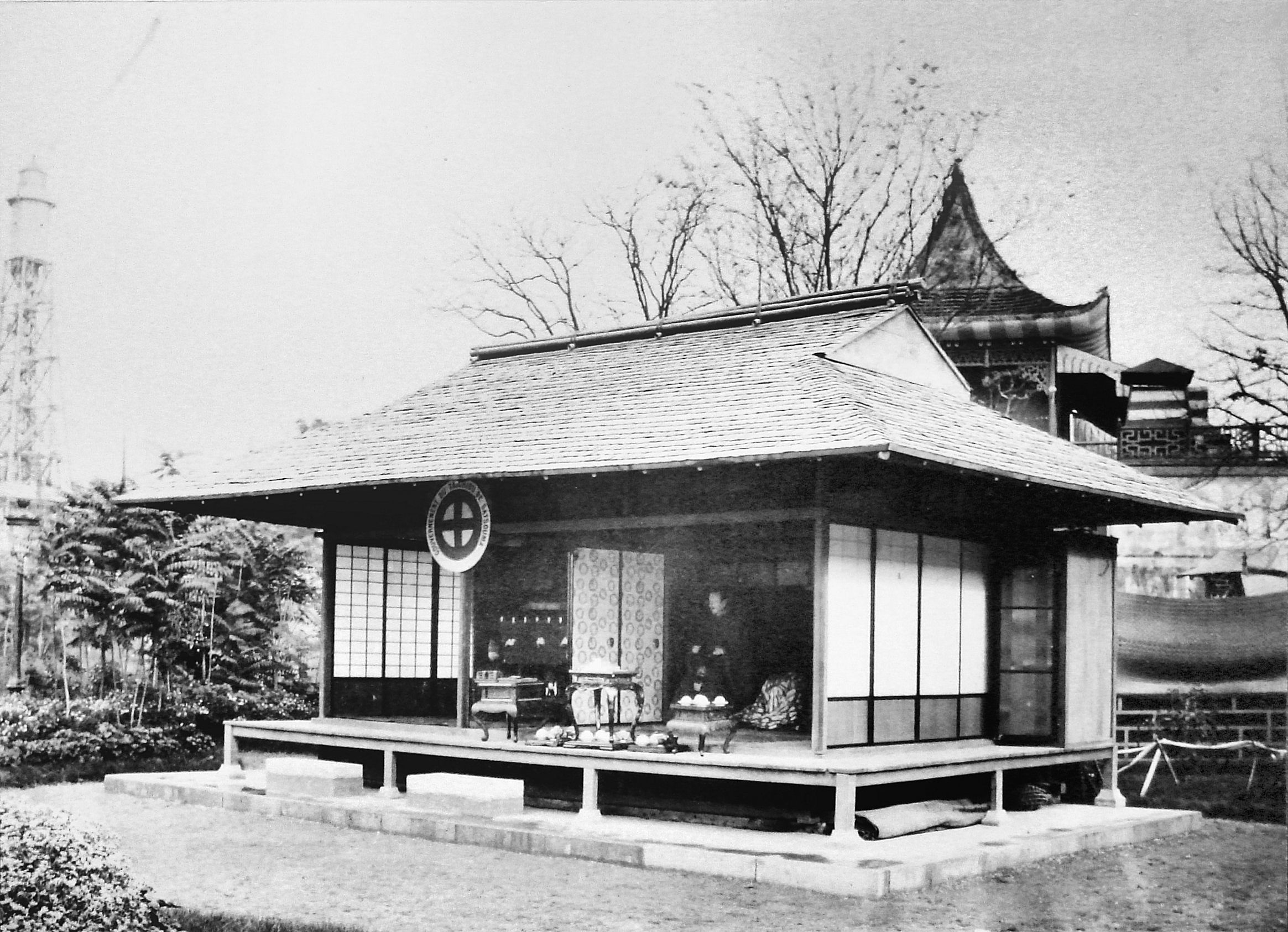
Japanese Satsuma pavilion at the French expo 1867

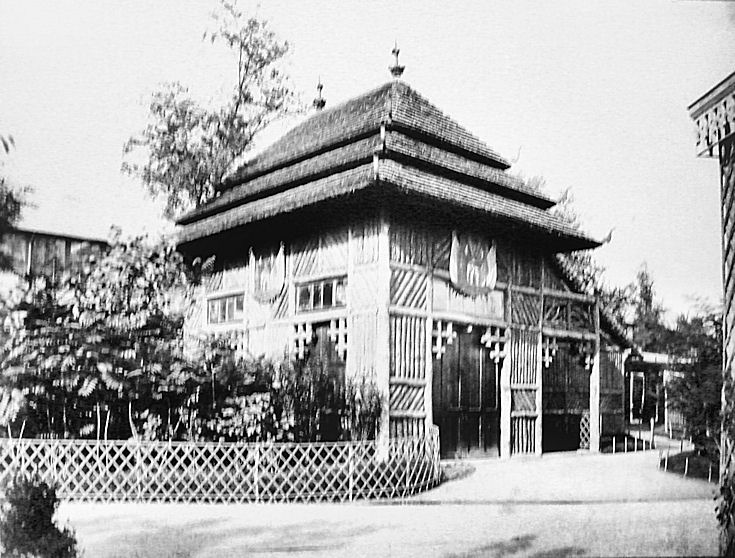
Siamese elephant pavillon at the Exposition

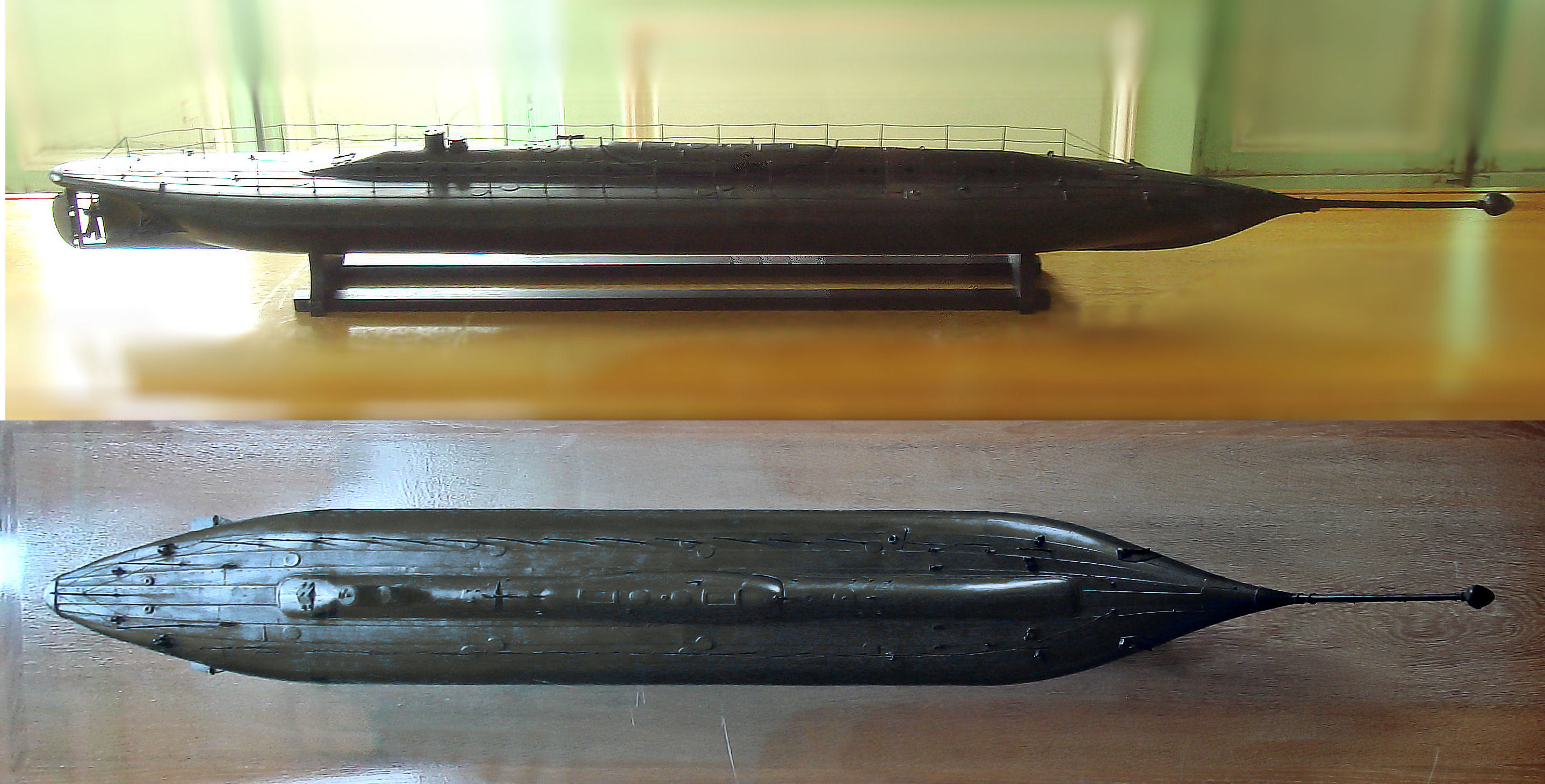
Model of Plongeur, made for the Exposition Universelle (1867). Musée National de la Marine (Rochefort).

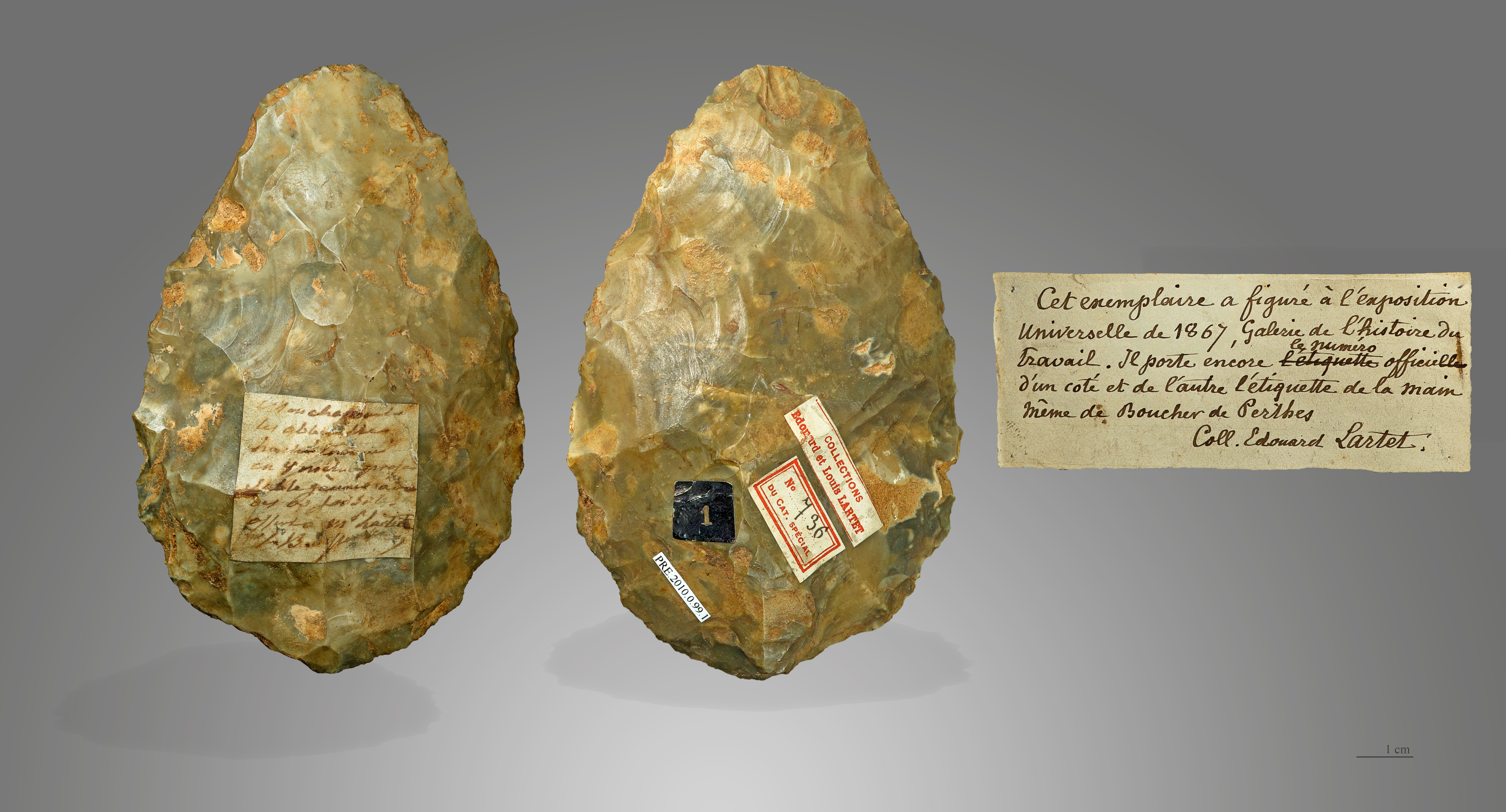
Flint Biface

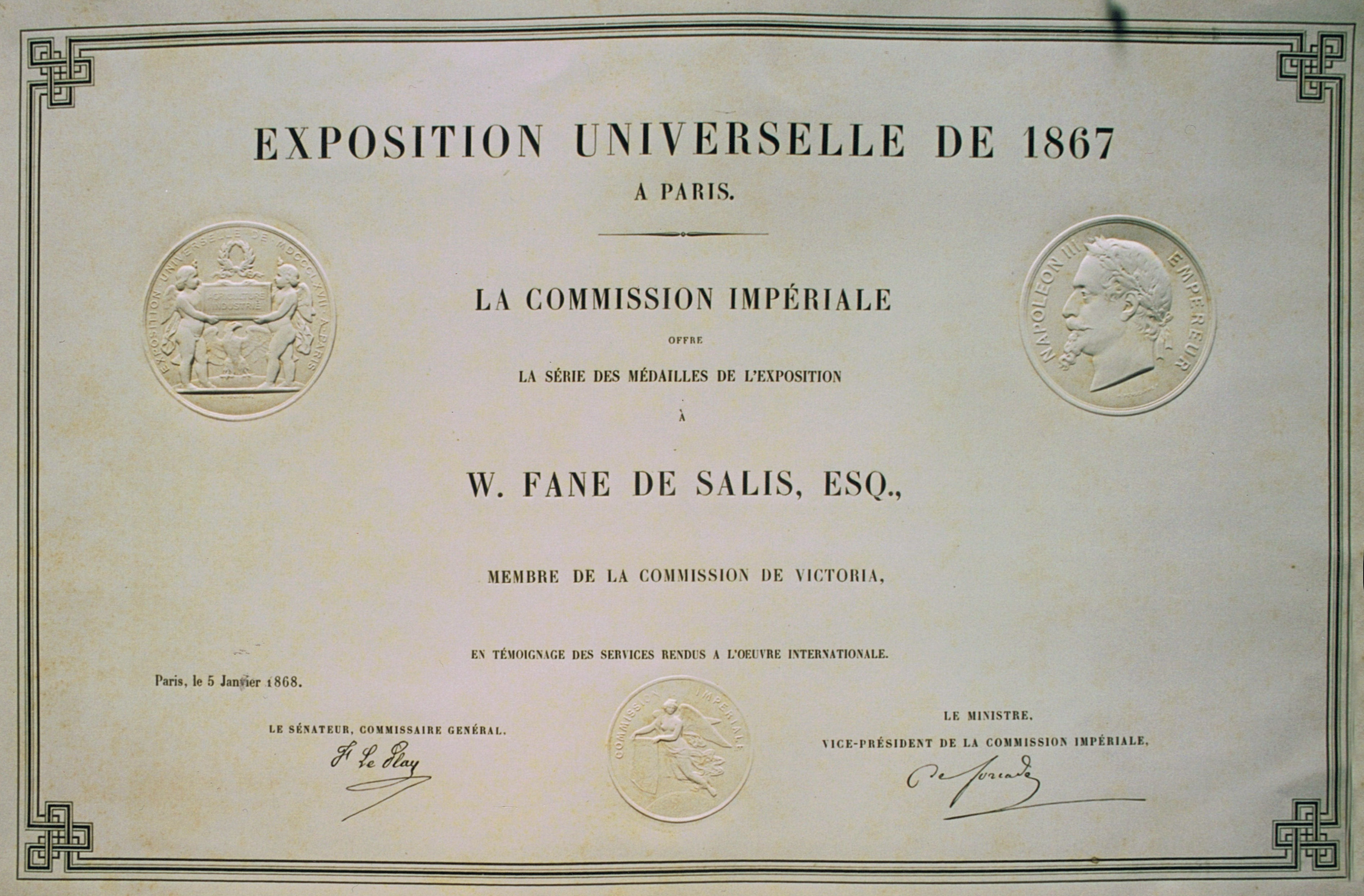
Commission awarded to one of the members of the (Australian state of) Victoria stand in 1867

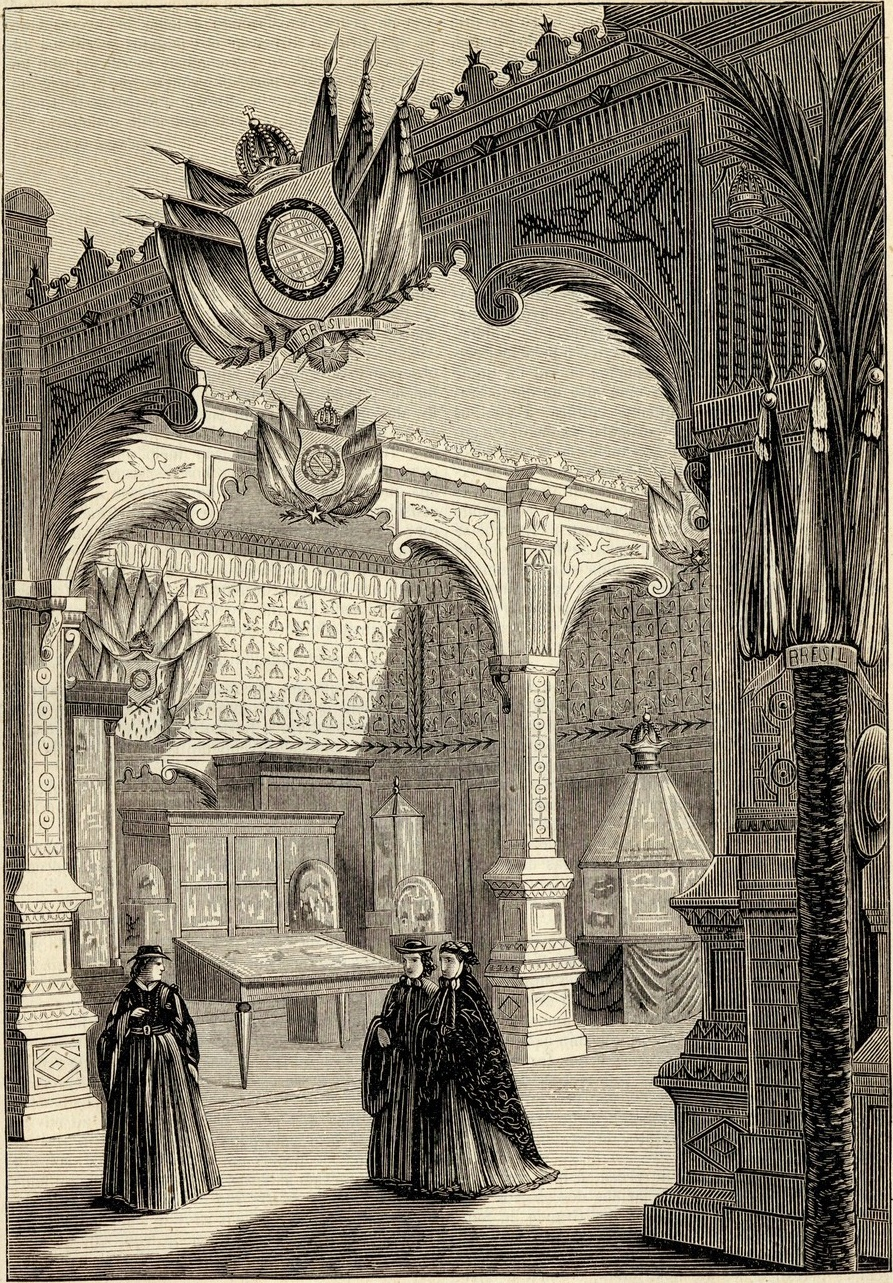
Brazilian exhibit at the 1867 Exposition Universelle

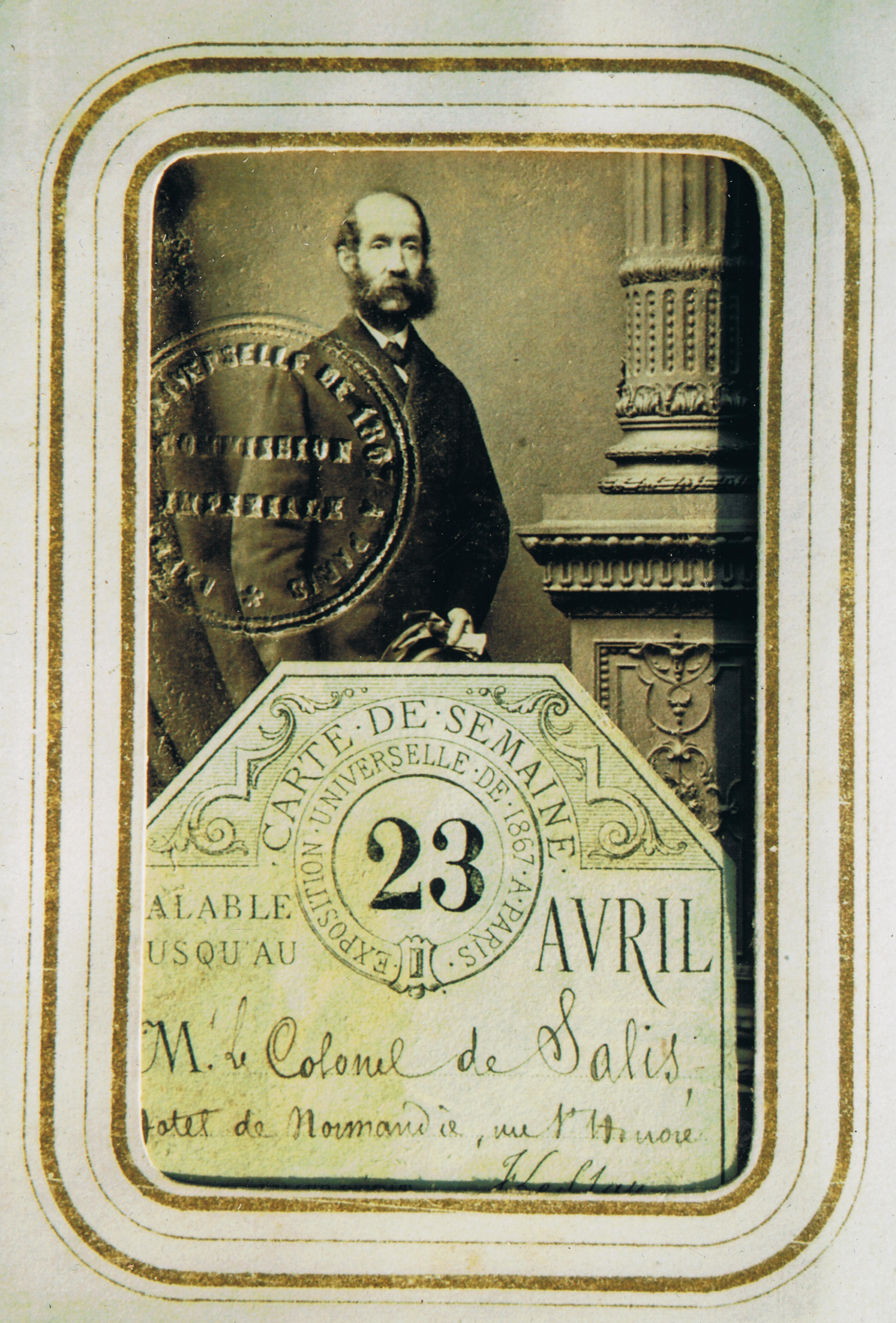
M. le Colonel de Salis' CARTE DE SEMAINE, A PARIS valable jusqu'au AVRIL 23. No doubt he was there to visit his brother, William's stand for the Australian State of Victoria.

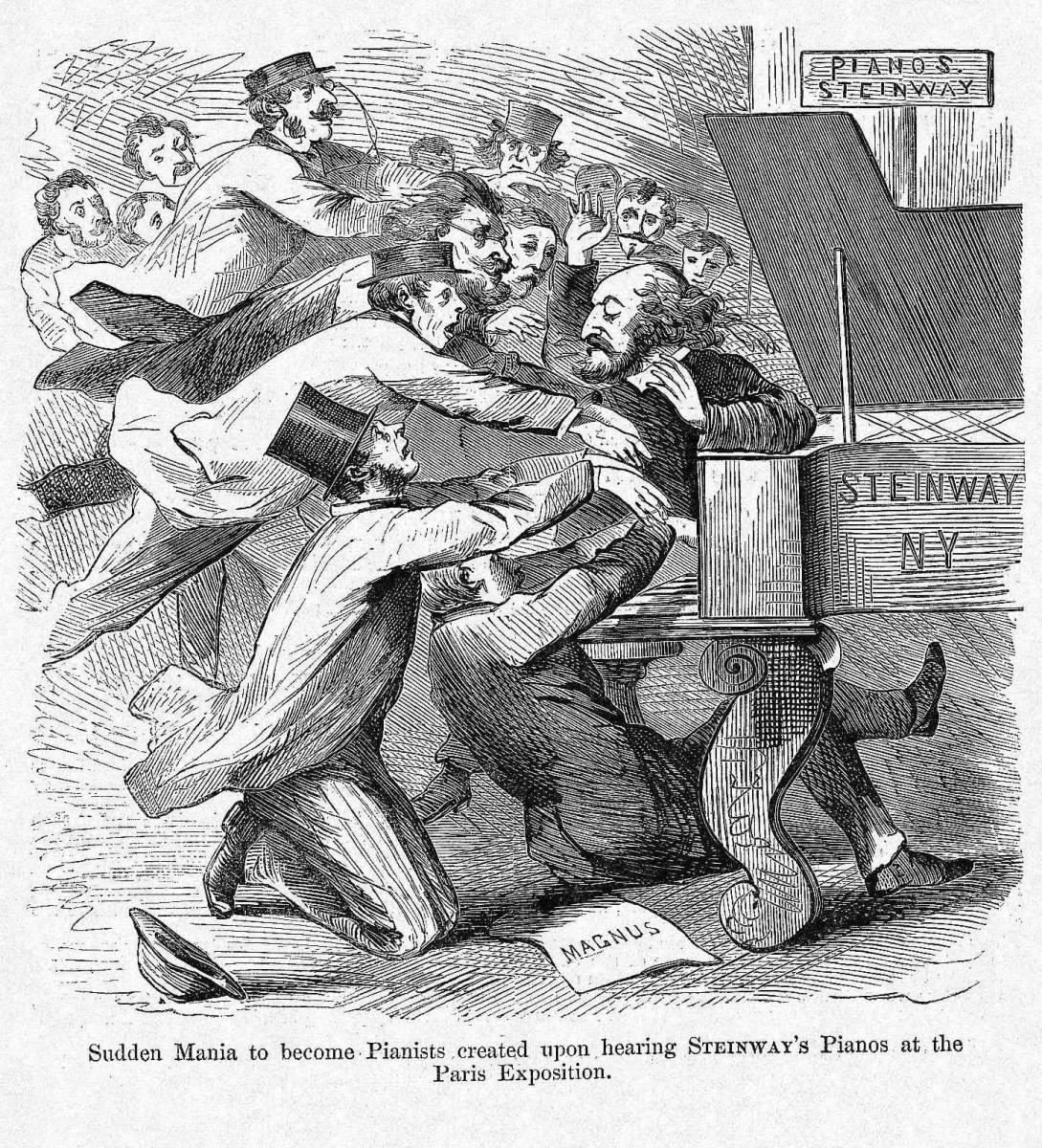
Sudden Mania to Become Pianists created upon hearing Steinway's Piano at the Paris Exposition. After a lithograph by "Cham", Amédée de Noé. From: Harper's Weekly, issue August 10, 1867, reporting on the 1867 Paris Exposition

== See also ==
- Paris Monetary Conference (1867)
- Rejtan (painting) (won gold medal at the exposition)
- Concert Tunisien
